= Human evolution =

Evolutionary process

A phylogenic model depicts (from lower right) Homo erectus spreading from Africa to Eurasia around 1.8 millions of years ago. Its descendant H. heidelbergensis originated Denisovans, Neanderthals, and H. sapiens (humans) around 350,000 years ago.

Homo sapiens is a distinct species of the hominid family of primates, which includes all the great apes. Over their evolutionary history, humans gradually developed traits such as bipedalism, dexterity, and complex language. Modern humans interbred with archaic humans, indicating that their evolution was not linear but weblike. The study of the origins of humans involves several scientific disciplines, including physical and evolutionary anthropology, paleontology, and genetics; the field is also known by the terms anthropogeny, anthropogenesis, and anthropogony—with the latter two sometimes used to refer to the related subject of hominization.

Primates diverged from other mammals about 85 million years ago, in the Late Cretaceous period, with their earliest fossils appearing over 55 mya, during the Paleocene. Primates produced successive clades leading to the ape superfamily, which gave rise to the hominid and the gibbon families; these diverged some 15–20 mya. African and Asian hominids (including orangutans) diverged about 14 mya. Hominins (including the Australopithecine and Panina subtribes) parted from the Gorillini tribe between 8 and 9 mya; Australopithecine (including the extinct biped ancestors of humans) separated from the Pan genus (containing chimpanzees and bonobos) 4–7 mya. The Homo genus is evidenced by the appearance of H. habilis over 2 mya, (Note: The conventional estimate on the age of H. habilis is at roughly 2.1 to 2.3 million years. Suggestions for pushing back the age to 2.8 Mya were made in 2015 based on the discovery of a jawbone.) while anatomically modern humans emerged in Africa approximately 300,000 years ago.

== Before Homo ==
=== Early evolution of primates ===
The evolutionary history of primates can be traced back 65 million years. The details of the origins and early evolution of primates are however still unknown to a large extent due to scarcity of fossil evidence. One of the oldest known primate-like mammal species, the Plesiadapis, came from North America; another, Archicebus, came from China. Other such early primates include Altiatlasius and Algeripithecus, which were found in Northern Africa. Other similar basal primates were widespread in Eurasia and Africa during the tropical conditions of the Paleocene and Eocene.

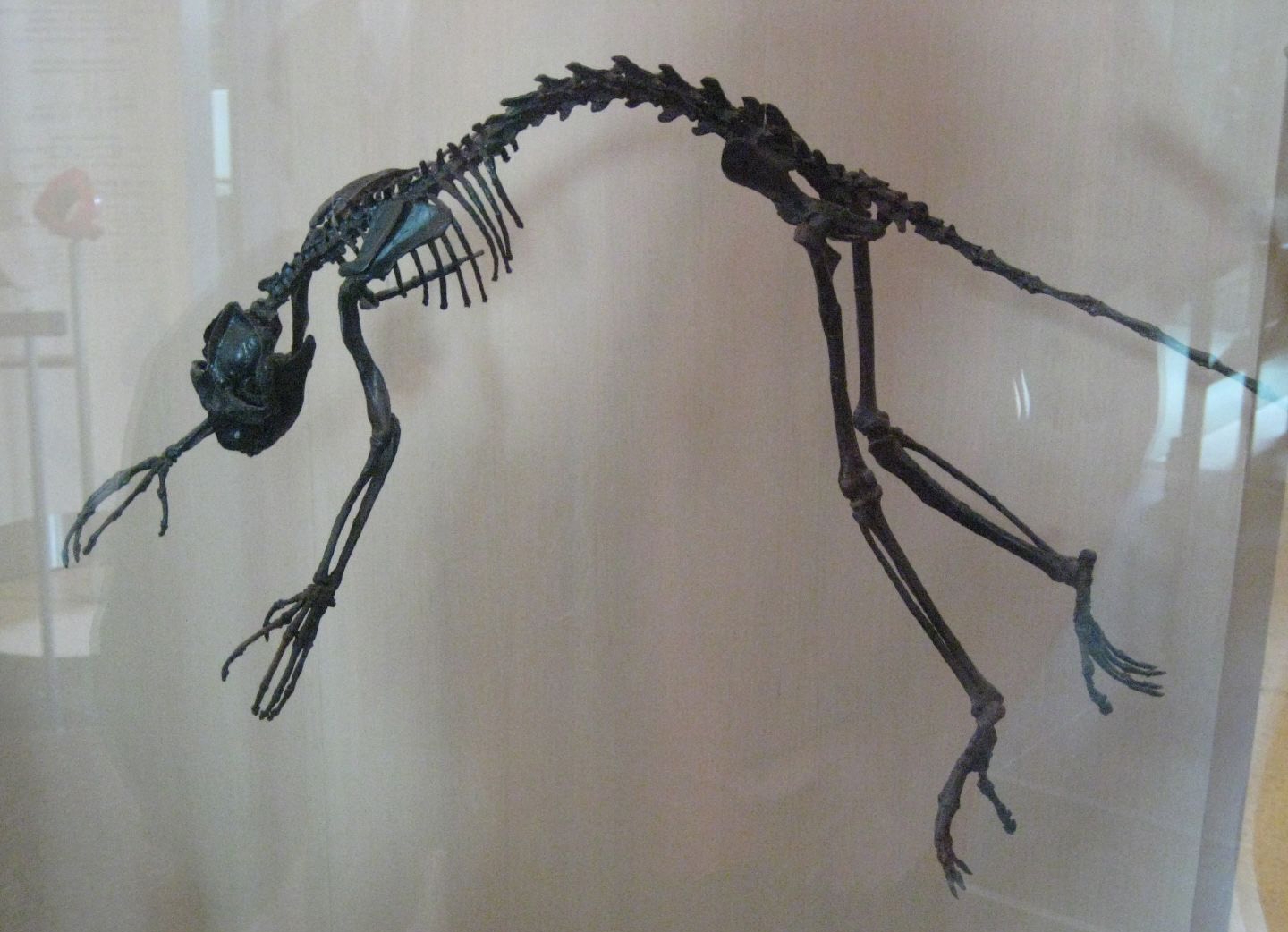
Notharctus tenebrosus, American Museum of Natural History, New York

David R. Begun theorized that early primates flourished first in Eurasia and that a lineage leading to the African apes and humans, including Dryopithecus, migrated south from Europe or Western Asia into Africa. However, earlier potential ancestors of primates such as Altiatlasius are known to have lived on the African continent much earlier than Dryopithecus.

The surviving tropical population of primates—which is seen most completely in the Upper Eocene and lowermost Oligocene fossil beds of the Faiyum depression southwest of Cairo—gave rise to all extant primate species, including the lemurs of Madagascar, lorises of Southeast Asia, galagos or "bush babies" of Africa, and to the anthropoids, which are the Platyrrhines or New World monkeys, the Catarrhines or Old World monkeys, and the great apes, including humans and other hominids.

The earliest known catarrhine is Kamoyapithecus from the uppermost Oligocene at Eragaleit in the northern Great Rift Valley in Kenya, dated to 24 million years ago. Its ancestry is thought to be species related to Aegyptopithecus, Propliopithecus, and Parapithecus from the Faiyum, at around 35 mya. In 2010, Saadanius was described as a close relative of the last common ancestor of the crown catarrhines, and tentatively dated to 29–28 mya, helping to fill an 11-million-year gap in the fossil record.

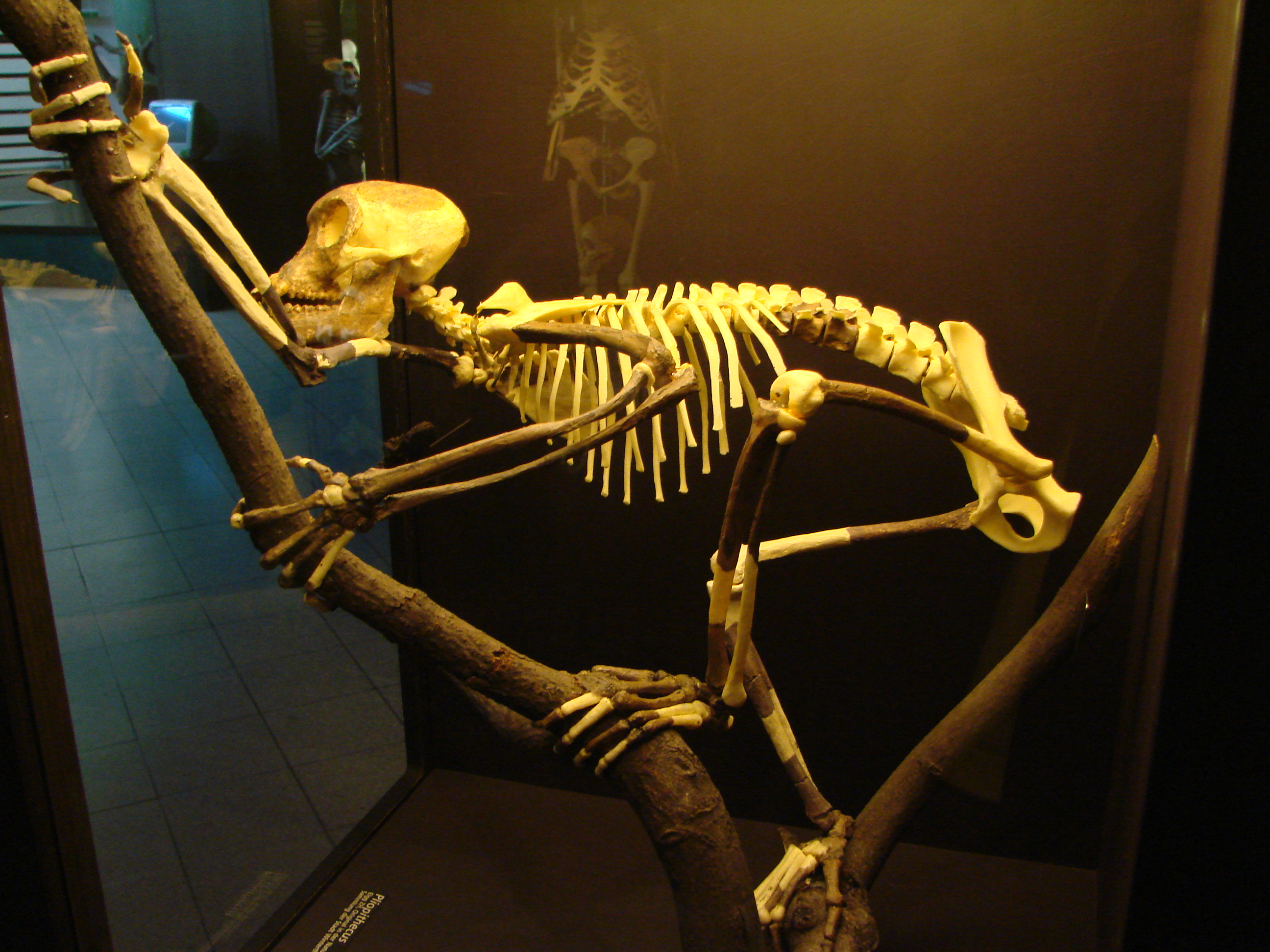
Reconstructed tailless Proconsul skeleton

In the Early Miocene, about 22 million years ago, the many kinds of arboreally-adapted (tree-dwelling) primitive catarrhines from East Africa suggest a long history of prior diversification. Fossils at 20 million years ago include fragments attributed to Victoriapithecus, the earliest Old World monkey. Among the genera thought to be in the ape lineage leading up to 13 million years ago are Proconsul, Rangwapithecus, Dendropithecus, Limnopithecus, Nacholapithecus, Equatorius, Nyanzapithecus, Afropithecus, Heliopithecus, and Kenyapithecus, all from East Africa.

The presence of other generalized non-cercopithecids of Middle Miocene from sites far distant, such as Otavipithecus from cave deposits in Namibia, and Pierolapithecus and Dryopithecus from France, Spain and Austria, is evidence of a wide diversity of forms across Africa and the Mediterranean basin during the relatively warm and equable climatic regimes of the Early and Middle Miocene. The youngest of the Miocene hominoids, Oreopithecus, is from coal beds in Italy that have been dated to 9 million years ago.

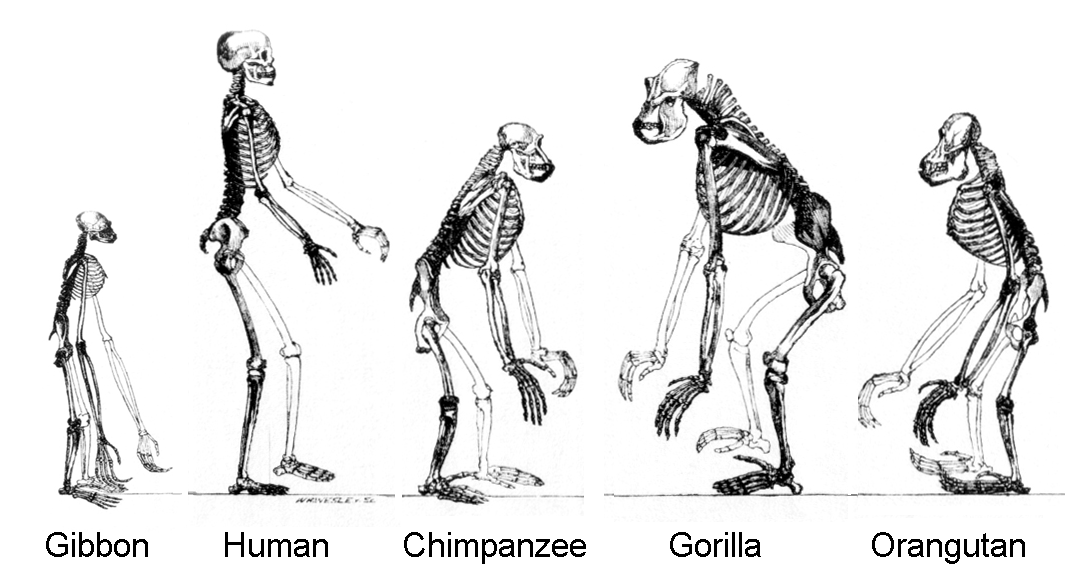
The ape superfamily (hominoids) comprises: the lesser apes (including gibbons) and great apes (chimpanzees, gorillas, orangutans and humans)

Molecular evidence indicates that the lineage of gibbons diverged from the line of great apes some 18–12 mya, and that of orangutans (subfamily Ponginae) (Note: Not to be confused with Pongidae, an obsolete family which grouped together orangutans, gorillas and chimpanzees to separate them from humans) diverged from the other great apes at about 12 million years; there are no fossils that clearly document the ancestry of gibbons, which may have originated in a so-far-unknown Southeast Asian hominoid population, but fossil proto-orangutans may be represented by Sivapithecus from India and Griphopithecus from Turkey, dated to around 10 mya.

Hominidae subfamily Homininae (African hominids) diverged from Ponginae (orangutans) about 14 mya. Hominins (including humans and the Australopithecine and Panina subtribes) parted from the Gorillini tribe (gorillas) between 8 and 9 mya; Australopithecine (including the extinct biped ancestors of humans) separated from the Pan genus (containing chimpanzees and bonobos) 4–7 mya. The Homo genus is evidenced by the appearance of H. habilis over 2 mya, while anatomically modern humans emerged in Africa approximately 300,000 years ago.

=== Divergence of the human clade from other great apes ===
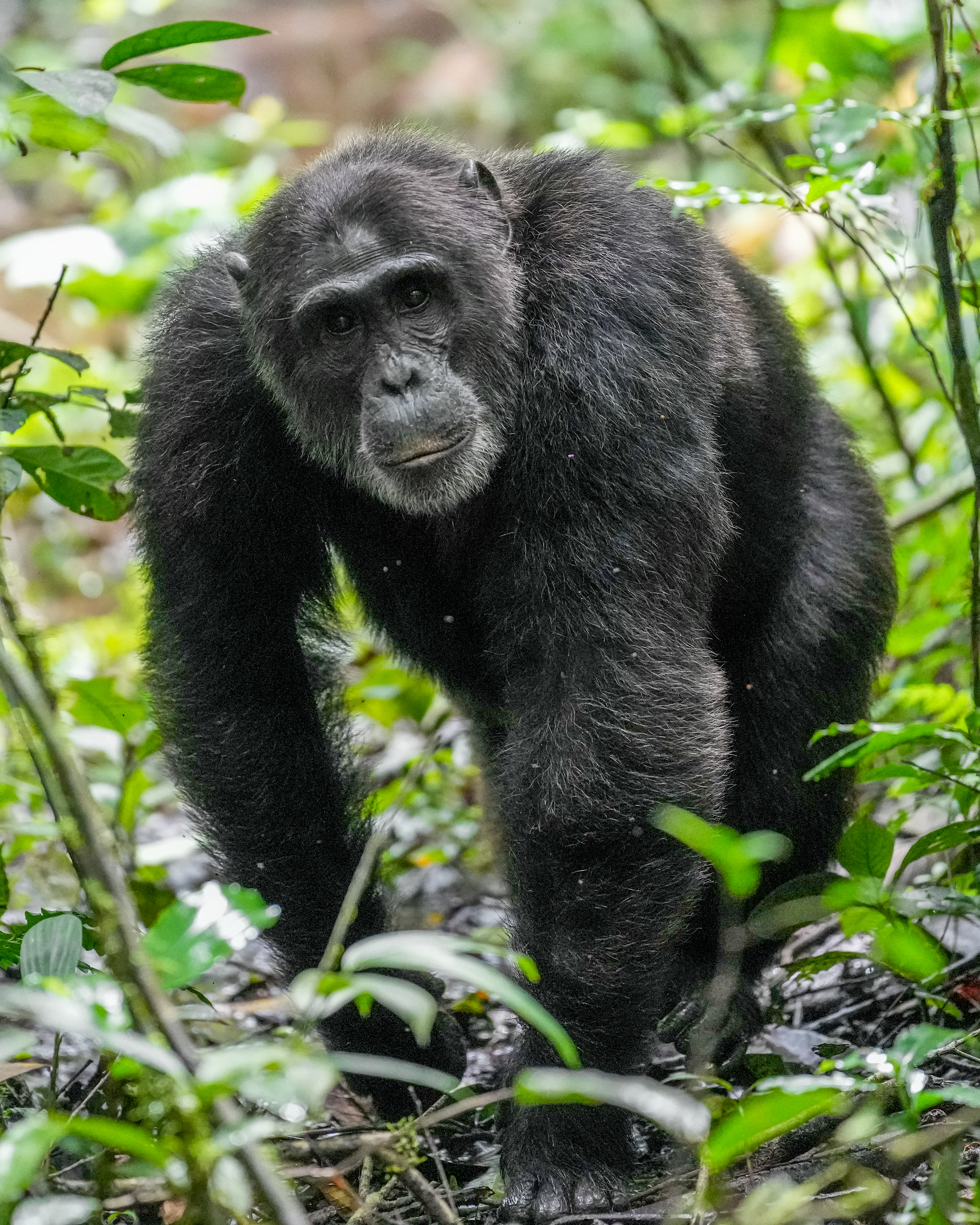
Genetic data suggest that chimpanzees and humans may have diverged from a common ancestor between 9 and 7 million years ago.

Species close to the last common ancestor of gorillas, chimpanzees and humans may be represented by Nakalipithecus fossils found in Kenya. Molecular evidence suggests that between 8 and 4 million years ago, first the gorillas, and then the chimpanzees (genus Pan) split off from the line leading to the humans. Human DNA is approximately 98.4% identical to that of chimpanzees when comparing single nucleotide polymorphisms (see human evolutionary genetics). The fossil record, however, of gorillas and chimpanzees is limited; both poor preservation – rain forest soils tend to be acidic and dissolve bone – and sampling bias probably contribute to this problem.

Other hominins probably adapted to the drier environments outside the equatorial belt; and there they encountered antelope, hyenas, dogs, pigs, elephants, horses, and others. The equatorial belt contracted after about 8 million years ago, and there is very little fossil evidence for the split—thought to have occurred around that time—of the hominin lineage from the lineages of gorillas and chimpanzees. The earliest fossils argued by some to belong to the human lineage are Sahelanthropus tchadensis (7 Ma) and Orrorin tugenensis (6 Ma), followed by Ardipithecus (5.5–4.4 Ma), with species Ar. kadabba and Ar. ramidus.

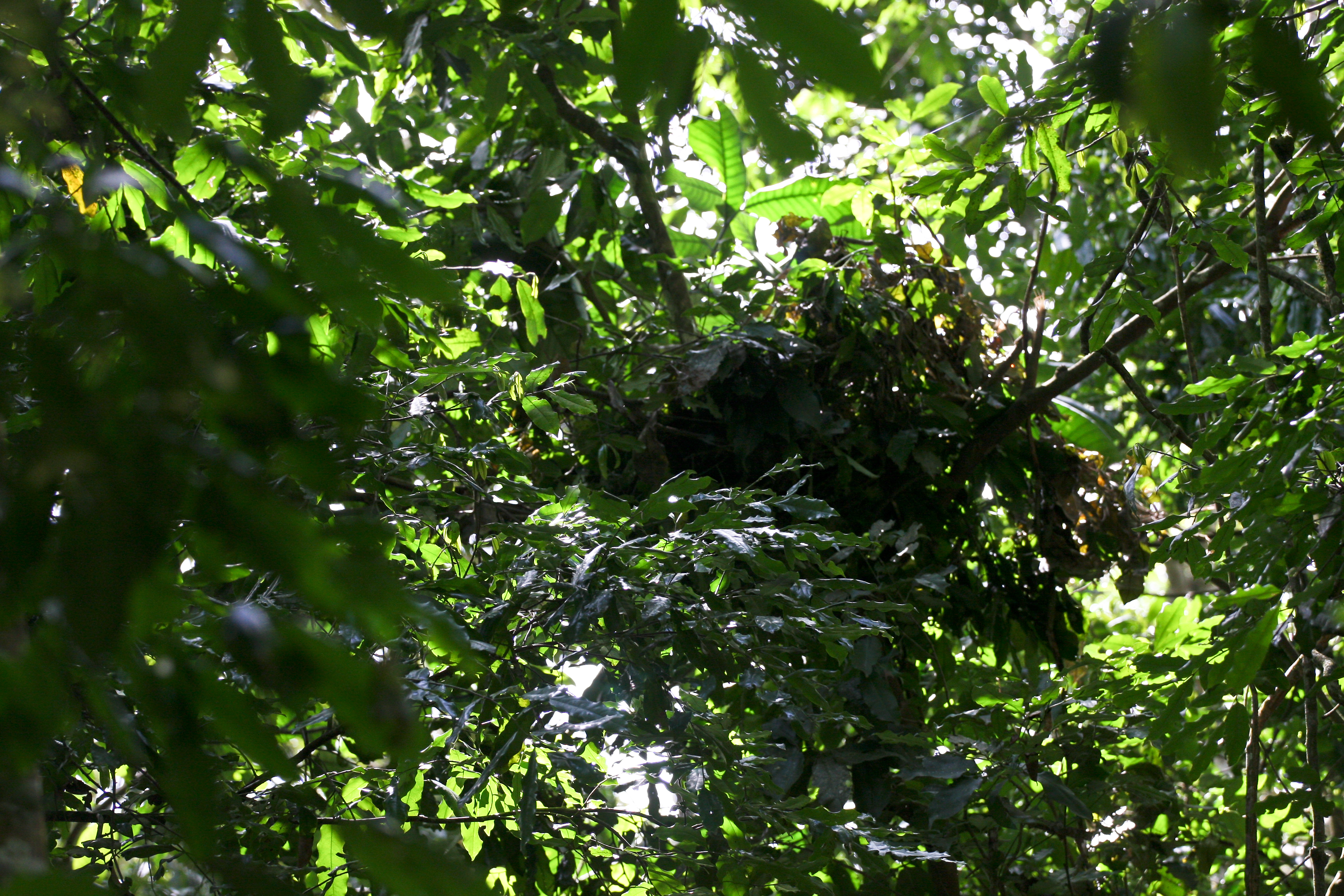
Chimpanzee nest. Later hominins may have developed niche creating shelter-building traditions from such earlier nest-building practices.

It has been argued in a study of the life history of Ar. ramidus that the species provides evidence for a suite of anatomical and behavioral adaptations in very early hominins unlike any species of extant great ape. This study demonstrated affinities between the skull morphology of Ar. ramidus and that of infant and juvenile chimpanzees, suggesting the species evolved a juvenalised or paedomorphic craniofacial morphology via heterochronic dissociation of growth trajectories. It was also argued that the species provides support for the notion that very early hominins, akin to bonobos (Pan paniscus), the less aggressive species of the genus Pan, may have evolved via the process of self-domestication. Consequently, arguing against the so-called "chimpanzee referential model" the authors suggest it is no longer tenable to use chimpanzee (Pan troglodytes) social and mating behaviors in models of early hominin social evolution. When commenting on the absence of aggressive canine morphology in Ar. ramidus and the implications this has for the evolution of hominin social psychology, they wrote:

Of course Ar. ramidus differs significantly from bonobos, bonobos having retained a functional canine honing complex. However, the fact that Ar. ramidus shares with bonobos reduced sexual dimorphism, and a more paedomorphic form relative to chimpanzees, suggests that the developmental and social adaptations evident in bonobos may be of assistance in future reconstructions of early hominin social and sexual psychology. In fact the trend towards increased maternal care, female mate selection and self-domestication may have been stronger and more refined in Ar. ramidus than what we see in bonobos.

The authors argue that many of the basic human adaptations evolved in the ancient forest and woodland ecosystems of late Miocene and early Pliocene Africa. Consequently, they argue that humans may not represent evolution from a chimpanzee-like ancestor as has traditionally been supposed. This suggests many modern human adaptations represent phylogenetically deep traits and that the behavior and morphology of chimpanzees may have evolved subsequent to the split with the common ancestor they share with humans.

=== Genus Australopithecus ===
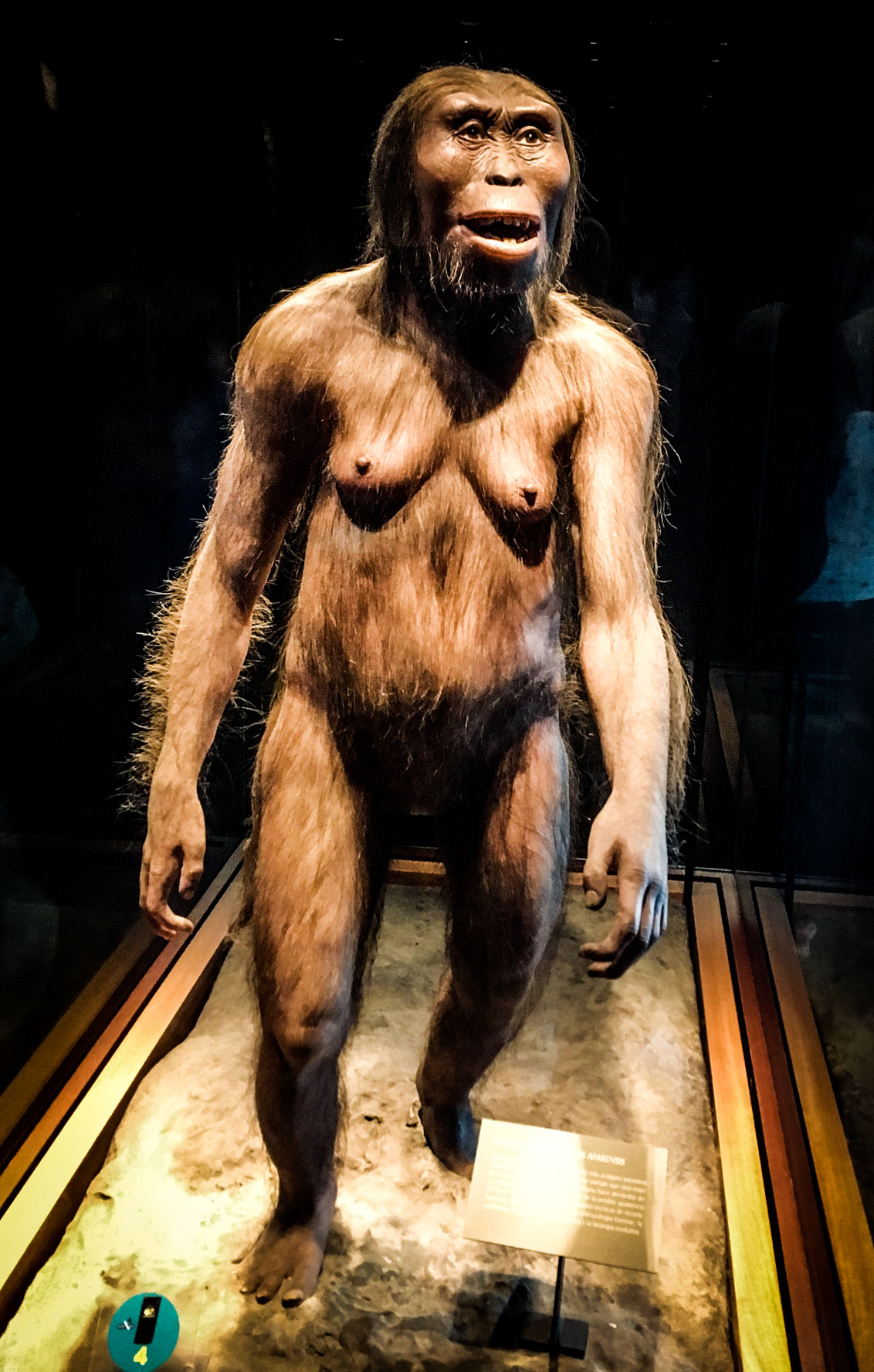
Reconstruction of "Lucy"

The genus Australopithecus evolved in eastern Africa around 4 million years ago before spreading throughout the continent and eventually becoming extinct 2 million years ago. During this time period various forms of australopiths existed, including Australopithecus anamensis, A. afarensis, A. sediba, and A. africanus. There is still some debate among academics whether certain African hominid species of this time, such as P. robustus and P. boisei, constitute members of the same genus; if so, they would be considered to be "robust australopiths" while the others would be considered "gracile australopiths". However, if these species do indeed constitute their own genus, then they may be given their own name, Paranthropus.

- Australopithecus (4–1.8 Ma), with species A. anamensis, A. afarensis, A. africanus, A. bahrelghazali, A. garhi, and A. sediba;
- Kenyanthropus (3–2.7 Ma), with species K. platyops;
- Paranthropus (3–1.2 Ma), with species P. aethiopicus, P. boisei, and P. robustus

A new proposed species Australopithecus deyiremeda is claimed to have been discovered living at the same time period of A. afarensis. There is debate whether A. deyiremeda is a new species or is A. afarensis. Australopithecus prometheus, otherwise known as Little Foot, has recently been dated at 3.67 million years old through a new dating technique, making the genus Australopithecus as old as afarensis. Given the opposable big toe found on Little Foot, it seems that the specimen was a good climber. It is thought given the night predators of the region that they built a nesting platform at night in the trees, in a similar fashion to chimpanzees and gorillas.

== Evolution of genus Homo ==
Hominin timeline
← / Earlier apes; ← / Gorilla split; ← / Chimpanzee split; ← / Earliest bipedal; ← / Earliest sign of Ardipithecus; ← / Earliest sign of Australopithecus; ← / Earliest stone tools; ← / Earliest sign of Homo; ← / Dispersal beyond Africa; ← / Earliest fire / cooking; ← / Earliest rock art; ← / Earliest clothes; ← / Modern humans
(million years ago)

The earliest documented representative of the genus Homo is the Ledi jaw, which is dated 2.75 – 2.8 million years ago (mya), and is arguably the earliest species for which there is positive evidence of the use of stone tools. The brains of these early hominins were about the same size as that of a chimpanzee, although it has been suggested that this was the time in which the human SRGAP2 gene doubled, producing a more rapid wiring of the frontal cortex. During the next million years a process of rapid encephalization occurred, and with the arrival of Homo erectus and Homo ergaster in the fossil record, cranial capacity had doubled to 850 cm^{3}. (Such an increase in human brain size is equivalent to each generation having 125,000 more neurons than their parents.) It is believed that H. erectus and H. ergaster were the first to use fire and complex tools, and they were the first of the hominin line to leave Africa, spreading throughout Africa, Asia, and Europe between 1.3 to 1.8 mya.

According to the recent African origin theory, modern humans evolved in Africa possibly from H. heidelbergensis, H. rhodesiensis or H. antecessor and migrated out of the continent some 50,000 to 100,000 years ago, gradually replacing local populations of H. erectus, Denisova hominins, H. floresiensis, H. luzonensis and H. neanderthalensis, whose ancestors had left Africa in earlier migrations. Archaic Homo sapiens, the forerunner of anatomically modern humans, evolved in the Middle Paleolithic between 400,000 and 250,000 years ago. Recent DNA evidence suggests that several haplotypes of Neanderthal origin are present among all non-African populations, and Neanderthals and other hominins, such as Denisovans, may have contributed up to 6% of their genome to present-day humans, suggestive of a limited interbreeding between these species. According to some anthropologists, the transition to behavioral modernity with the development of symbolic culture, language, and specialized lithic technology happened around 50,000 years ago (beginning of the Upper Paleolithic), although others point to evidence of a gradual change over a longer time span during the Middle Paleolithic.

Homo sapiens is the only extant species of its genus, Homo. While some (extinct) Homo species might have been ancestors of Homo sapiens, many, perhaps most, were likely "cousins", having speciated away from the ancestral hominin line. There is yet no consensus as to which of these groups should be considered a separate species and which should be subspecies; this may be due to the dearth of fossils or to the slight differences used to classify species in the genus Homo. The Sahara pump theory (describing an occasionally passable "wet" Sahara desert) provides one possible explanation of the intermittent migration and speciation in the genus Homo.

Based on archaeological and paleontological evidence, it has been possible to infer, to some extent, the ancient dietary practices of various Homo species and to study the role of diet in physical and behavioral evolution within Homo.

Some anthropologists and archaeologists subscribe to the Toba catastrophe theory, which posits that the supereruption of Lake Toba on Sumatra in Indonesia some 70,000 years ago caused global starvation, killing the majority of humans and creating a population bottleneck that affected the genetic inheritance of all humans today. The genetic and archaeological evidence for this remains in question however. A 2023 genetic study suggests that a similar human population bottleneck of between 1,000 and 100,000 survivors occurred "around 930,000 and 813,000 years ago ... lasted for about 117,000 years and brought human ancestors close to extinction."

=== H. habilis and H. gautengensis ===
Homo habilis lived from about 2.8 to 1.4 Ma. The species evolved in South and East Africa in the Late Pliocene or Early Pleistocene, 2.5–2 Ma, when it diverged from the australopithecines with the development of smaller molars and larger brains. One of the first known hominins, it made tools from stone and perhaps animal bones, leading to its name homo habilis (Latin 'handy man') bestowed by discoverer Louis Leakey. Some scientists have proposed moving this species from Homo into Australopithecus due to the morphology of its skeleton being more adapted to living in trees rather than walking on two legs like later hominins.

In May 2010, a new species, Homo gautengensis, was proposed based on specimens discovered in South Africa.

=== H. rudolfensis and H. georgicus ===
These are proposed species names for fossils from about 1.9–1.6 Ma, whose relation to Homo habilis is not yet clear.

- Homo rudolfensis refers to a single, incomplete skull from Kenya. Scientists have suggested that this was a specimen of Homo habilis, but this has not been confirmed. It is currently thought that H. rudolfensis is an early hominid species, alongside H. erectus and H. habilis.
- Homo georgicus, from Georgia, may be an intermediate form between Homo habilis and Homo erectus, or a subspecies of Homo erectus.

=== H. ergaster and H. erectus ===
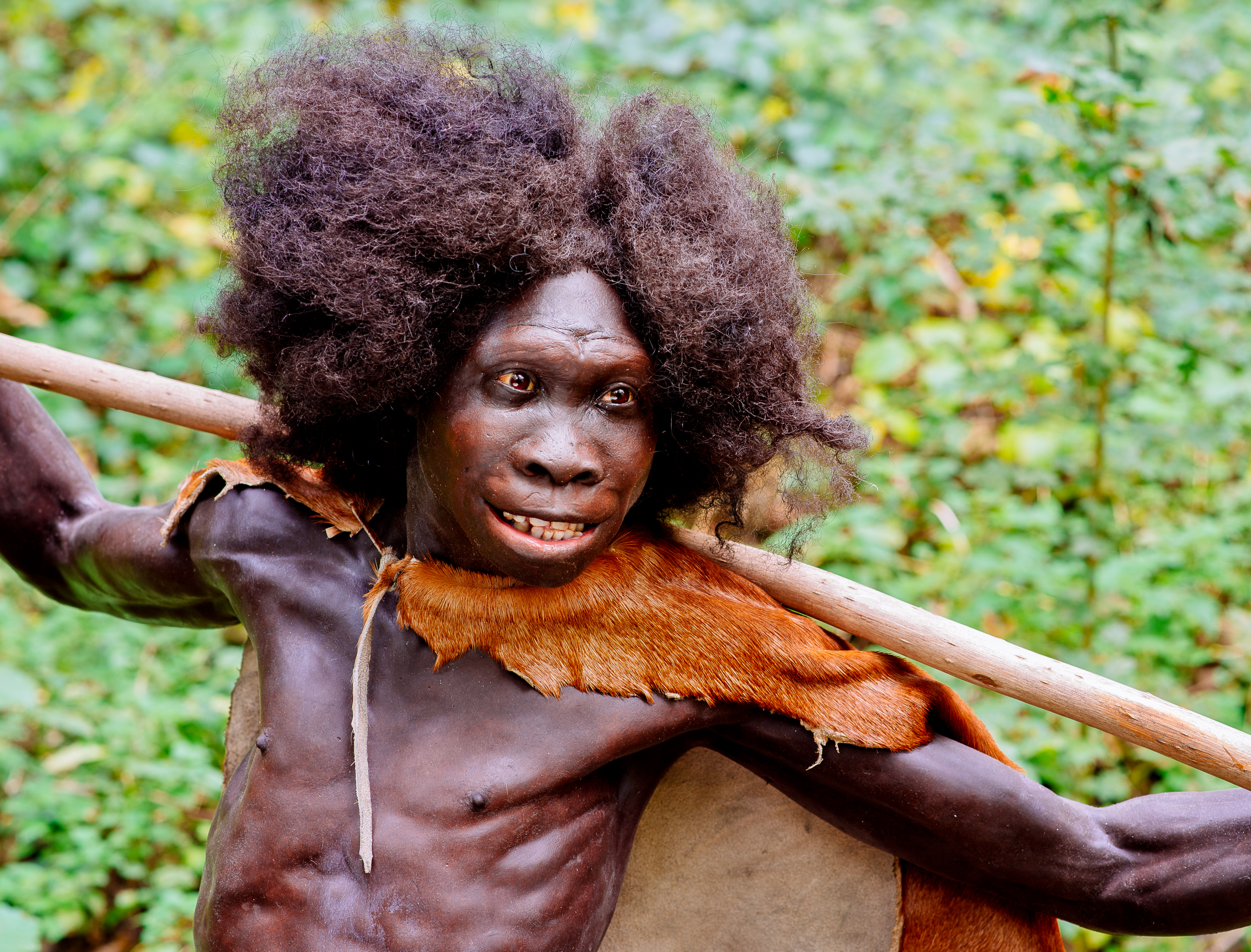
Reconstruction of Turkana Boy who lived 1.5 to 1.6 million years ago

The first fossils of Homo erectus were discovered by Dutch physician Eugene Dubois in 1891 on the Indonesian island of Java. He originally named the material Anthropopithecus erectus (1892–1893, considered at this point as a chimpanzee-like fossil primate) and Pithecanthropus erectus (1893–1894, changing his mind based on its morphology, which he considered to be intermediate between that of humans and apes). Years later, in the 20th century, the German physician and paleoanthropologist Franz Weidenreich (1873–1948) compared in detail the characters of Dubois' Java Man, then named Pithecanthropus erectus, with the characters of the Peking Man, then named Sinanthropus pekinensis. Weidenreich concluded in 1940 that because of their anatomical similarity with modern humans it was necessary to gather all these specimens of Java and China in a single species of the genus Homo, the species H. erectus.

Homo erectus lived from about 1.8 Ma to about 108,000 years ago. This population appears to have died out when the savannah corridors closed, and tropical jungle took over.; however, nearby H. floresiensis survived it. The early phase of H. erectus, from 1.8 to 1.25 Ma, is considered by some to be a separate species, H. ergaster, or as H. erectus ergaster, a subspecies of H. erectus. Many paleoanthropologists now use the term Homo ergaster for the non-Asian forms of this group, and reserve H. erectus only for those fossils that are found in Asia and meet certain skeletal and dental requirements which differ slightly from H. ergaster.

In Africa in the Early Pleistocene, 1.5–1 Ma, some populations of Homo habilis are thought to have evolved larger brains and to have made more elaborate stone tools; these differences and others are sufficient for anthropologists to classify them as a new species, Homo erectus—in Africa. This species also may have used fire to cook meat. Richard Wrangham notes that Homo seems to have been ground dwelling, with reduced intestinal length, smaller dentition, and "brains [swollen] to their current, horrendously fuel-inefficient size", and hypothesizes that control of fire and cooking, which released increased nutritional value, was the key adaptation that separated Homo from tree-sleeping Australopithecines.

=== H. cepranensis and H. antecessor ===
These are proposed as species intermediate between H. erectus and H. heidelbergensis.

- H. antecessor is known from fossils from Spain and England that are dated 1.2 Ma–500 ka. Two H. antecessor scapulae fossils were discovered at the Gran Dolina cave site in Spain. Researchers compared the found scapulae with other fossils of chimpanzees, modern humans, and troglodytes. They found that the H. antecessor fossils were more developmentally similar to modern humans. This corroborates with previous findings on H. antecessor skulls, where their cranial bones display features that both Chinese Middle Pleistocene hominins and modern humans share. These findings suggest that H. cepranensis may be the last common ancestor between H. sapiens, H. neanderthalensis and Denisovans, though more research would need to be done to verify this hypothesis. A 2020 study argues that H. antecessor, with a facial structure similar to that of H. sapiens, belongs to the genus Homo, whereas the cranial structure of Neanderthals is derivative.
- H. cepranensis refers to a single skull cap from Italy, estimated to be about 800,000 years old. In 1994, researchers in Italy discovered skull fragments. After assembly, the distinct shape separated them from other hominid species, leading researchers to believe it was part of a previously unknown hominid species. They named it H. cepranensis sp. nov. after the site it was found in (Campo Grande of Ceprano). Comparing the skull to other known hominid species, they found that H. cepranensis sp. nov. bones differed in bone thickness, length, and angles. This led to the conclusion that H. cepranensis sp. nov. is a distinct hominid species.

=== H. heidelbergensis ===
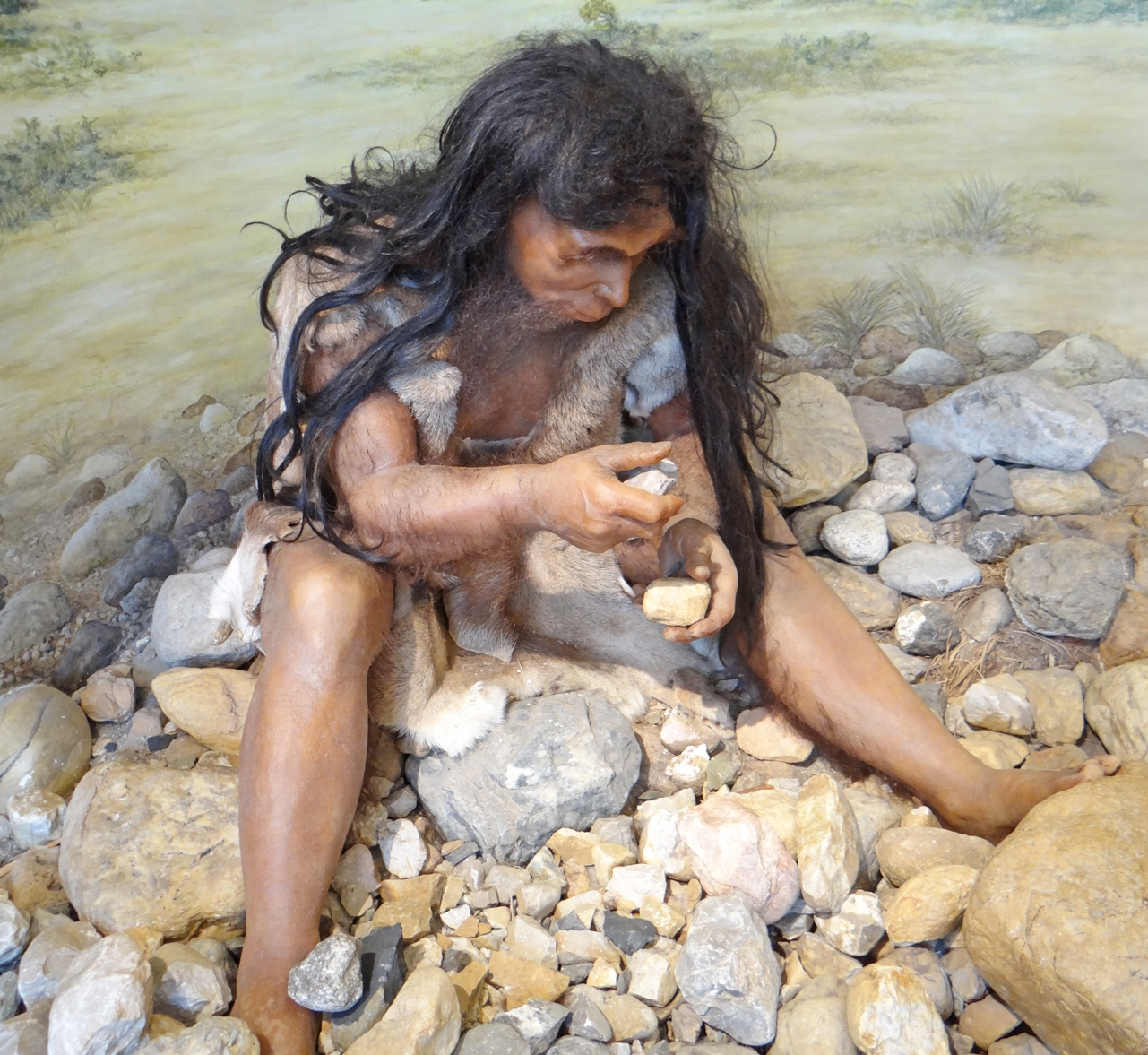
Reconstruction of H. heidelbergensis

H. heidelbergensis ("Heidelberg Man") lived from about 800,000 to about 300,000 years ago. It is also proposed as Homo sapiens heidelbergensis or Homo sapiens paleohungaricus.

In 1907, miners in Germany discovered the Mauer mandible, a very primitive fossilized jaw. An analysis of the jaw by Otto Schoetensack prompted the attribution of this jaw to a new species: H. heidelbergensis. The validity of this species as its own species and an ancestor to the Neandertals has been debated. In 2009, a study was conducted to reevaluate the Mauer mandible against other fossilized remains to determine where on the human evolutionary scale H. heidelbergensis may lie or if it is even valid as a separate species. With this reevaluation, researchers concluded that H. heidelbergensis was most likely an Afro-European species that was a common ancestor to both Neandertals and H. sapiens, though it is also possible that H. heidelbergensis was a European species that was an ancestor to only Neandertals, while another species from Africa was the ancestor to H. sapiens.

In 2026, hominin fossils from Thomas Quarry I in Casablanca, Morocco, were dated to approximately 773,000 years ago. The remains display a combination of primitive traits and features resembling those of later Homo sapiens and Eurasian archaic humans. The researchers interpreted the fossils as probably representing an evolved African form of Homo erectus sensu lato and as evidence for an African lineage near the ancestry of H. sapiens, although they did not identify the population as the last common ancestor of modern humans, Neanderthals and Denisovans.

=== H. rhodesiensis, and the Gawis cranium ===
- In 1921, a cranium was found in cave deposits during a mining excursion in what is now known as Zambia. H. rhodesiensis, estimated to be 300,000–125,000 years old. Most current researchers place Rhodesian Man within the group of Homo heidelbergensis, though other designations such as archaic Homo sapiens and Homo sapiens rhodesiensis have been proposed. This fossil has expanded the idea of the evolution of H. sapiens; current estimates place the emergence of H. sapiens at around 500,000 years ago.
- In February 2006 a fossil, the Gawis cranium, was found which might possibly be a species intermediate between H. erectus and H. sapiens or one of many evolutionary dead ends. The skull from Gawis, Ethiopia, is believed to be 500,000–250,000 years old. Only summary details are known, and the finders have not yet released a peer-reviewed study. Gawis man's facial features suggest that it is either an intermediate species or an example of a "Bodo man" female.

=== Neanderthal and Denisovan ===
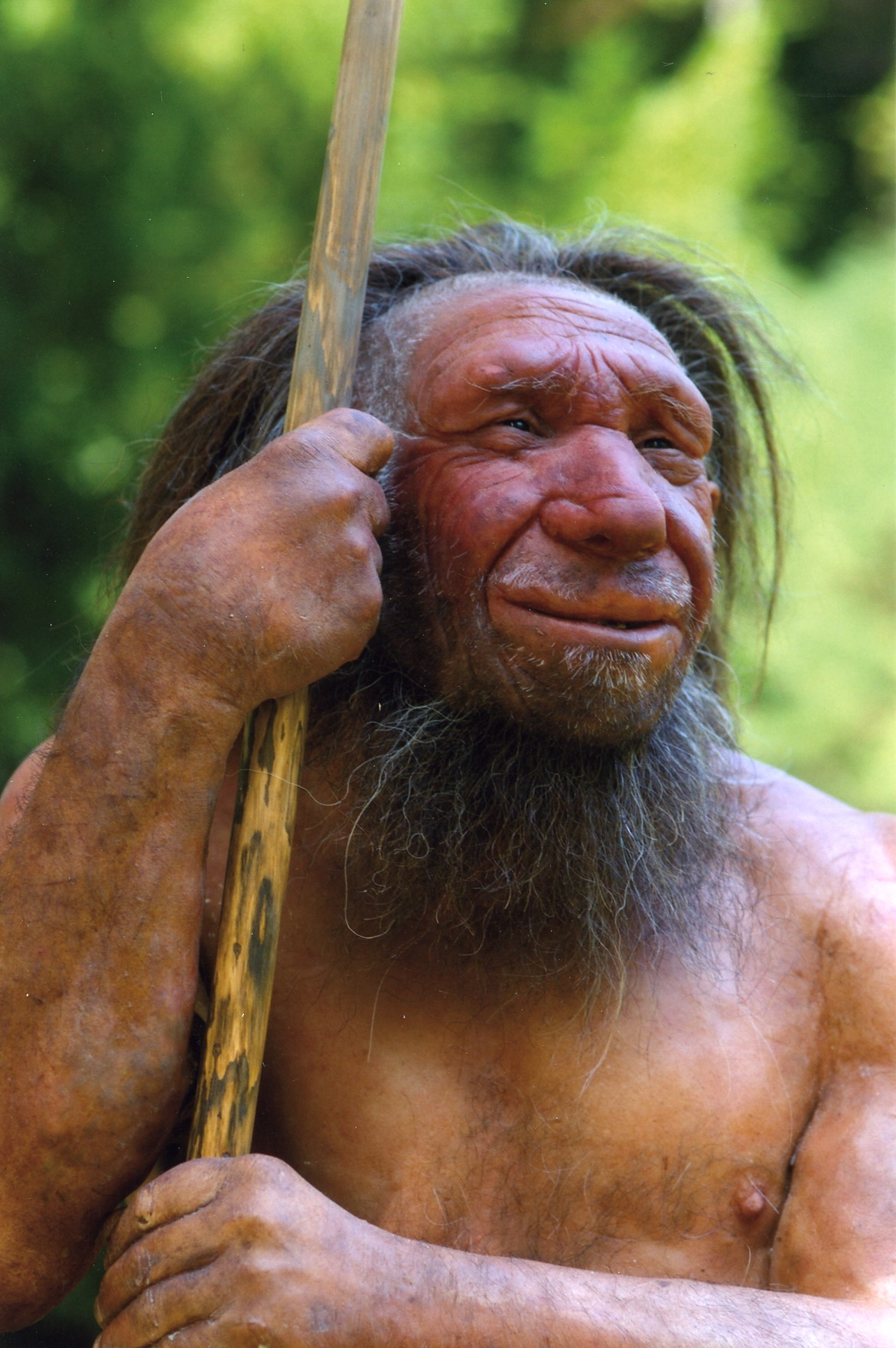
Reconstruction of an elderly Neanderthal man

Homo neanderthalensis, alternatively designated as Homo sapiens neanderthalensis, lived in Europe and Asia from 400,000 to about 28,000 years ago. There are a number of clear anatomical differences between anatomically modern humans (AMH) and Neanderthal specimens, many relating to the superior Neanderthal adaptation to cold environments. Neanderthal surface to volume ratio was even lower than that among modern Inuit populations, indicating superior retention of body heat.

Neanderthals also had significantly larger brains, as shown from brain endocasts, casting doubt on their intellectual inferiority to modern humans. However, the higher body mass of Neanderthals may have required larger brain mass for body control. Also, recent research by Pearce, Stringer, and Dunbar has shown important differences in brain architecture. The larger size of the Neanderthal orbital chamber and occipital lobe suggests that they had a better visual acuity than modern humans, useful in the dimmer light of glacial Europe.

Neanderthals may have had less brain capacity available for social functions. Inferring social group size from endocranial volume (minus occipital lobe size) suggests that Neanderthal groups may have been limited to 120 individuals, compared to 144 possible relationships for modern humans. Larger social groups could imply that modern humans had less risk of inbreeding within their clan, trade over larger areas (confirmed in the distribution of stone tools), and faster spread of social and technological innovations. All these may have contributed to modern Homo sapiens replacing Neanderthal populations by 28,000 BP.

Earlier evidence from sequencing mitochondrial DNA suggested that no significant gene flow occurred between H. neanderthalensis and H. sapiens, and that the two were separate species that shared a common ancestor about 660,000 years ago. However, a sequencing of the Neanderthal genome in 2010 indicated that Neanderthals did indeed interbreed with anatomically modern humans c. 45,000-80,000 years ago, around the time modern humans migrated out from Africa, but before they dispersed throughout Europe, Asia and elsewhere. The genetic sequencing of a 40,000-year-old human skeleton from Romania showed that 11% of its genome was Neanderthal, implying the individual had a Neanderthal ancestor 4–6 generations previously, in addition to a contribution from earlier interbreeding in the Middle East. Though this interbred Romanian population seems not to have been ancestral to modern humans, the finding indicates that interbreeding happened repeatedly.

All modern non-African humans have about 1% to 4% (or 1.5% to 2.6% by more recent data) of their DNA derived from Neanderthals. This finding is consistent with recent studies indicating that the divergence of some human alleles dates to one Ma, although this interpretation has been questioned. Neanderthals and AMH Homo sapiens could have co-existed in Europe for as long as 10,000 years, during which AMH populations exploded, vastly outnumbering Neanderthals, possibly outcompeting them by sheer numbers.

In 2008, archaeologists working at the site of Denisova Cave in the Altai Mountains of Siberia uncovered a small bone fragment from the fifth finger of a juvenile member of another human species, the Denisovans. Artifacts, including a bracelet, excavated in the cave at the same level were carbon dated to around 40,000 BP. As DNA had survived in the fossil fragment due to the cool climate of the Denisova Cave, both mtDNA and nuclear DNA were sequenced.

While the divergence point of the mtDNA was unexpectedly deep in time, the full genomic sequence suggested the Denisovans belonged to the same lineage as Neanderthals, with the two diverging shortly after their line split from the lineage that gave rise to modern humans. Modern humans are known to have overlapped with Neanderthals in Europe and the Near East for possibly more than 40,000 years, and the discovery raises the possibility that Neanderthals, Denisovans, and modern humans may have co-existed and interbred. The existence of this distant branch creates a much more complex picture of humankind during the Late Pleistocene than previously thought. Evidence has also been found that as much as 6% of the DNA of some modern Melanesians derive from Denisovans, indicating limited interbreeding in Southeast Asia.

Alleles thought to have originated in Neanderthals and Denisovans have been identified at several genetic loci in the genomes of modern humans outside Africa. Human leukocyte antigen (HLA) haplotypes from Denisovans and Neanderthal represent more than half the HLA alleles of modern Eurasians, indicating strong positive selection for these introgressed alleles. Corinne Simoneti at Vanderbilt University, in Nashville and her team have found from medical records of 28,000 people of European descent that the presence of Neanderthal DNA segments may be associated with a higher rate of depression.

The flow of genes from Neanderthal populations to modern humans was not all one way. Sergi Castellano of the Max Planck Institute for Evolutionary Anthropology reported in 2016 that while Denisovan and Neanderthal genomes are more related to each other than they are to us, Siberian Neanderthal genomes show more similarity to modern human genes than do European Neanderthal populations. This suggests Neanderthal populations interbred with modern humans around 100,000 years ago, probably somewhere in the Near East.

Studies of a Neanderthal child at Gibraltar show from brain development and tooth eruption that Neanderthal children may have matured more rapidly than Homo sapiens.

=== H. floresiensis ===
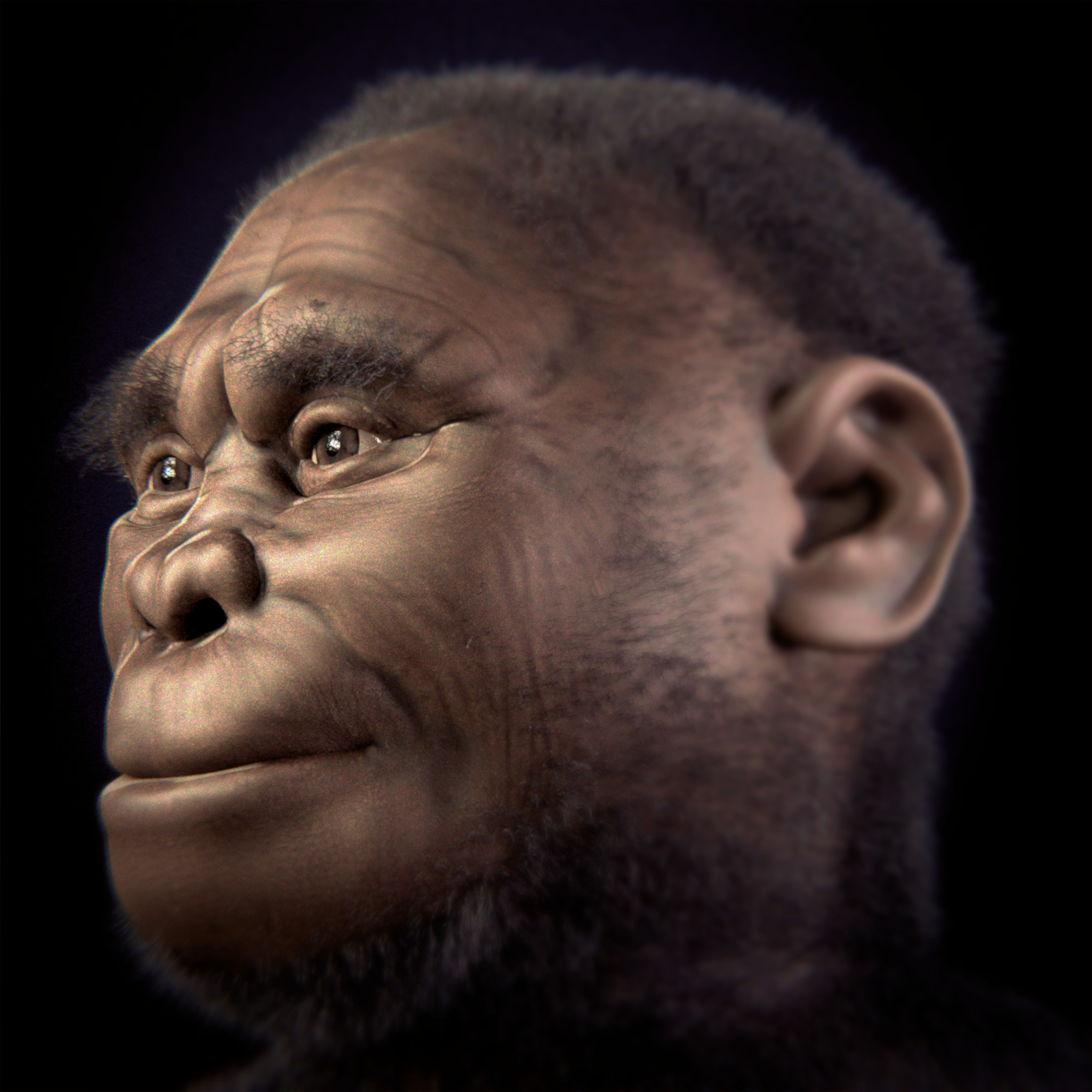
A facial reconstruction of Homo floresiensis

H. floresiensis, which lived from approximately 190,000 to 50,000 years before present (BP), has been nicknamed the hobbit for its small size, possibly a result of insular dwarfism. H. floresiensis is intriguing both for its size and its age, being an example of a recent species of the genus Homo that exhibits derived traits not shared with modern humans. In other words, H. floresiensis shares a common ancestor with modern humans, but split from the modern human lineage and followed a distinct evolutionary path. The main find was a skeleton believed to be a woman of about 30 years of age. Found in 2003, it has been dated to approximately 18,000 years old. The living woman was estimated to be one meter in height, with a brain volume of just 380 cm^{3} (considered small for a chimpanzee and less than a third of the H. sapiens average of 1400 cm^{3}).

However, there is an ongoing debate over whether H. floresiensis is indeed a separate species. Some scientists hold that H. floresiensis was a modern H. sapiens with pathological dwarfism. This hypothesis is supported in part, because some modern humans who live on Flores, the Indonesian island where the skeleton was found, are pygmies. This, coupled with pathological dwarfism, could have resulted in a significantly diminutive human. The other major attack on H. floresiensis as a separate species is that it was found with tools only associated with H. sapiens.

The hypothesis of pathological dwarfism, however, fails to explain additional anatomical features that are unlike those of modern humans (diseased or not) but much like those of ancient members of our genus. Aside from cranial features, these features include the form of bones in the wrist, forearm, shoulder, knees, and feet. Additionally, this hypothesis fails to explain the find of multiple examples of individuals with these same characteristics, indicating they were common to a large population, and not limited to one individual.

In 2016, fossil teeth and a partial jaw from hominins assumed to be ancestral to H. floresiensis were discovered at Mata Menge, about 74 km (46 mi) from Liang Bua. They date to about 700,000 years ago and are noted by Australian archaeologist Gerrit van den Bergh for being even smaller than the later fossils.

=== H. luzonensis ===
A small number of specimens from the island of Luzon, dated 50,000 to 67,000 years ago, have recently been assigned by their discoverers, based on dental characteristics, to a novel human species, H. luzonensis.

=== H. sapiens ===
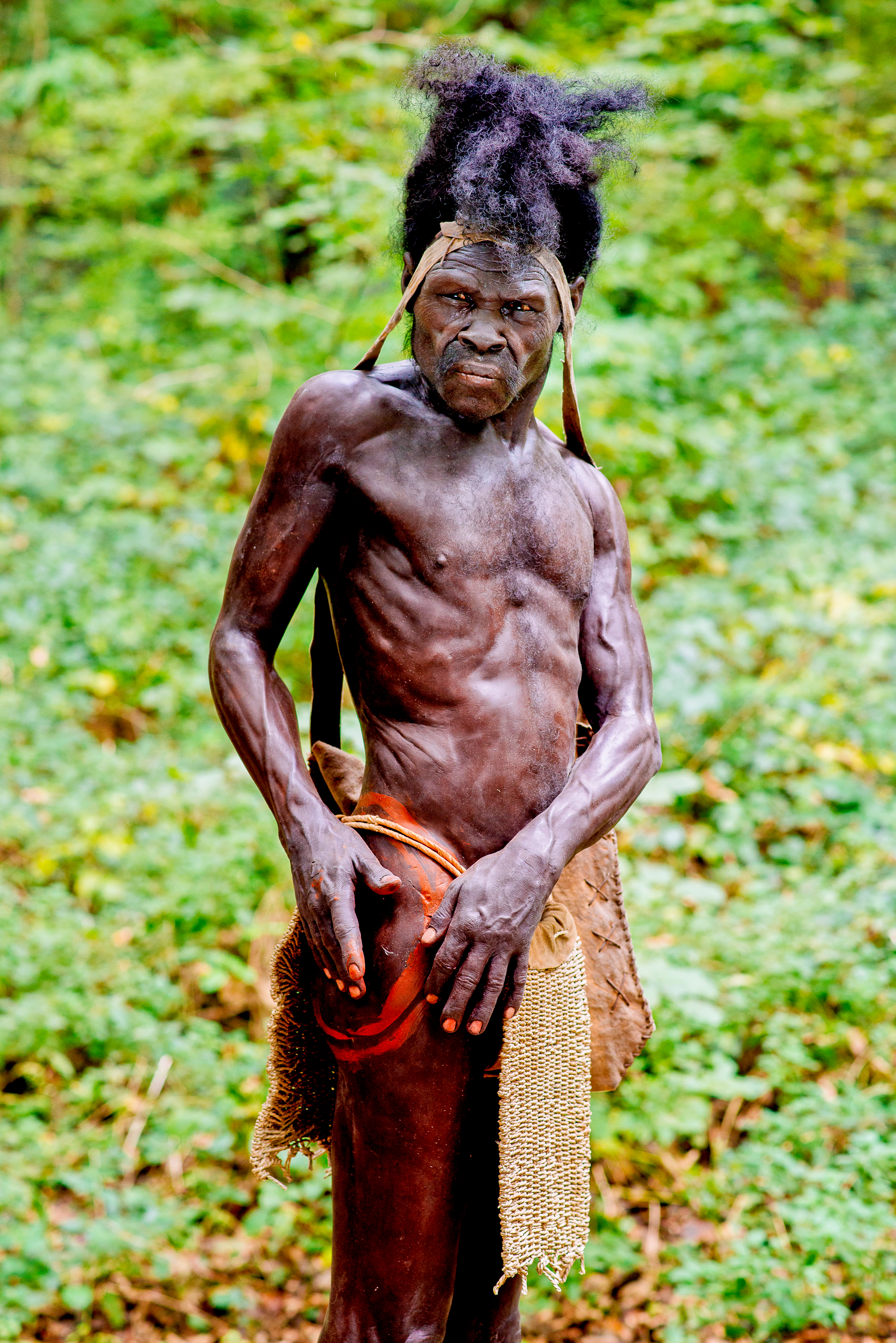
Reconstruction of early Homo sapiens from Jebel Irhoud, Morocco c. 315,000 years BP

H. sapiens (the adjective sapiens is Latin for "wise" or "intelligent") emerged in Africa around 300,000 years ago, likely derived from H. heidelbergensis or a related lineage. In September 2019, scientists reported the computerized determination, based on 260 CT scans, of a virtual skull shape of the last common human ancestor to modern humans (H. sapiens), representative of the earliest modern humans, and suggested that modern humans arose between 260,000 and 350,000 years ago through a merging of populations in East and South Africa.

Between 400,000 years ago and the second interglacial period in the Middle Pleistocene, around 250,000 years ago, the trend in intra-cranial volume expansion and the elaboration of stone tool technologies developed, providing evidence for a transition from H. erectus to H. sapiens. The direct evidence suggests there was a migration of H. erectus out of Africa, then a further speciation of H. sapiens from H. erectus in Africa. A subsequent migration (both within and out of Africa) eventually replaced the earlier dispersed H. erectus. This migration and origin theory is usually referred to as the "recent single-origin hypothesis" or "out of Africa" theory. H. sapiens interbred with archaic humans both in Africa and in Eurasia, in Eurasia notably with Neanderthals and Denisovans.

The Toba catastrophe theory, which postulates a population bottleneck for H. sapiens about 70,000 years ago, was controversial from its first proposal in the 1990s and by the 2010s had very little support. Distinctive human genetic variability has arisen as the result of the founder effect, by archaic admixture and by recent evolutionary pressures.

== Anatomical changes ==
Since Homo sapiens separated from its last common ancestor shared with chimpanzees, human evolution is characterized by a number of morphological, developmental, physiological, behavioral, and environmental changes. Environmental (cultural) evolution discovered much later during the Pleistocene played a significant role in human evolution observed via human transitions between subsistence systems. The most significant of these adaptations are bipedalism, increased brain size, lengthened ontogeny (gestation and infancy), and decreased sexual dimorphism. The relationship between these changes is the subject of ongoing debate. Other significant morphological changes included the evolution of a power and precision grip, a change first occurring in H. erectus.

=== Bipedalism ===
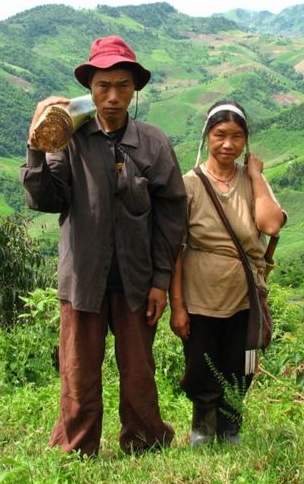
Bipedalism shown by a man and a woman

Bipedalism (walking on two legs) is the basic adaptation of the hominid and is considered the main cause behind a suite of skeletal changes shared by all bipedal hominids. Fossil records regarding bipedalism since the 1990s have placed the emergence of the earliest hominins to the late Miocene era. The earliest hominin, of presumably primitive bipedalism, is considered to be either Sahelanthropus or Orrorin, both of which arose some 6 to 7 million years ago. The non-bipedal knuckle-walkers, the gorillas and chimpanzees, diverged from the hominin line over a period covering the same time, so either Sahelanthropus or Orrorin may be our last shared ancestor. Ardipithecus, a full biped, arose approximately 5.6 million years ago.

The early bipeds eventually evolved into the australopithecines and still later into the genus Homo. There are several theories of the adaptation value of bipedalism. It is possible that bipedalism was favored because it freed the hands for reaching and carrying food, saved energy during locomotion, enabled long-distance running and hunting, provided an enhanced field of vision, and helped avoid hyperthermia by reducing the surface area exposed to direct sun; features all advantageous for thriving in the new savanna and woodland environment created as a result of the East African Rift Valley uplift versus the previous closed forest habitat. A 2007 study provides support for the hypothesis that bipedalism evolved because it used less energy than quadrupedal knuckle-walking. However, recent studies suggest that bipedality without the ability to use fire would not have allowed global dispersal. This change in gait saw a lengthening of the legs proportionately when compared to the length of the arms, which were shortened through the removal of the need for brachiation. Another change is the shape of the big toe. Recent studies suggest that australopithecines still lived part of the time in trees as a result of maintaining a grasping big toe. This was progressively lost in habilines.

Anatomically, the evolution of bipedalism has been accompanied by a large number of skeletal changes, not just to the legs and pelvis, but also to the vertebral column, feet and ankles, and skull. The femur evolved into a slightly more angular position to move the center of gravity toward the geometric center of the body. The knee and ankle joints became increasingly robust to better support increased weight. To support the increased weight on each vertebra in the upright position, the human vertebral column became S-shaped and the lumbar vertebrae became shorter and wider. In the feet the big toe moved into alignment with the other toes to help in forward locomotion. The arms and forearms shortened relative to the legs making it easier to run. The foramen magnum migrated under the skull and more anterior.

The most significant changes occurred in the pelvic region, where the long downward facing iliac blade was shortened and widened as a requirement for keeping the center of gravity stable while walking; bipedal hominids have a shorter but broader, bowl-like pelvis due to this. A drawback is that the birth canal of bipedal apes is smaller than in knuckle-walking apes, though there has been a widening of it in comparison to that of australopithecine and modern humans, thus permitting the passage of newborns due to the increase in cranial size. This is limited to the upper portion, since further increase can hinder normal bipedal movement.

The shortening of the pelvis and smaller birth canal evolved as a requirement for bipedalism and had significant effects on the process of human birth, which is much more difficult in modern humans than in other primates. During human birth, because of the variation in size of the pelvic region, the fetal head must be in a transverse position (compared to the mother) during entry into the birth canal and rotate about 90 degrees upon exit. The smaller birth canal became a limiting factor to brain size increases in early humans and prompted a shorter gestation period leading to the relative immaturity of human offspring, who are unable to walk much before 12 months and have greater neoteny, compared to other primates, who are mobile at a much earlier age. The increased brain growth after birth and the increased dependency of children on mothers had a major effect upon the female reproductive cycle, and the more frequent appearance of alloparenting in humans when compared with other hominids. Delayed human sexual maturity also led to the evolution of menopause with one explanation, the grandmother hypothesis, providing that elderly women could better pass on their genes by taking care of their daughter's offspring, as compared to having more children of their own.

=== Encephalization ===
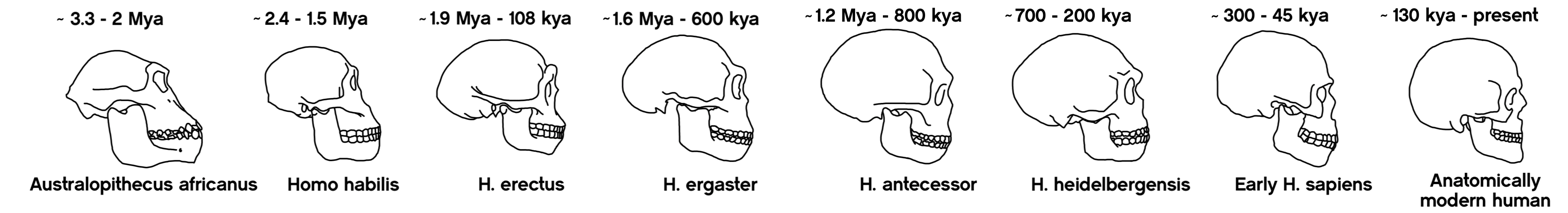
Skulls of successive (or near-successive, depending on the source) human evolutionary ancestors, (Note: There is no general agreement on the line of special descent of H. sapiens from H. erectus. Some of the species depicted in the image may not actually represent a direct evolutionary ancestor to H. sapiens, and may not directly derive from one another, namely: H. heidelbergensis likely did not descend from H. antecessor.; H. heidelbergensis is likely not an ancestor to H. sapiens, nor is H. antecessor.; H. ergaster is often considered the next evolutionary ancestor to H. sapiens following H. erectus, however, there is considerable uncertainty as to the accuracy of classifying it as a separate species from H. erectus at all.) up until 'modern' Homo sapiens
* Mya – million years ago, kya – thousand years ago

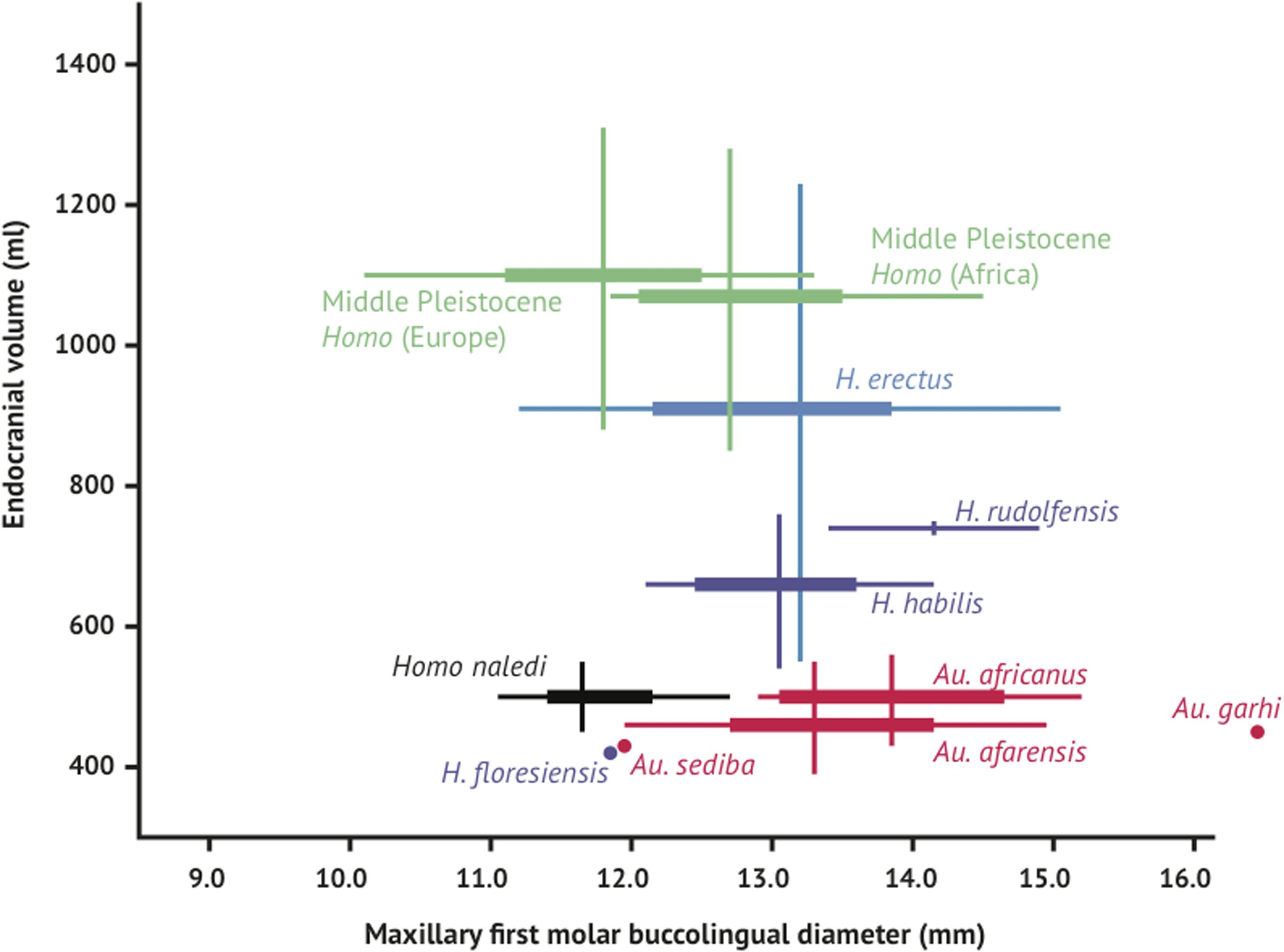
Brain size and tooth size in hominins

The human species eventually developed a much larger brain than that of other primates—typically 1,330 cm^{3} (81 cu in) in modern humans, nearly three times the size of a chimpanzee or gorilla brain. After a period of stasis with Australopithecus anamensis and Ardipithecus, species which had smaller brains as a result of their bipedal locomotion, the pattern of encephalization started with Homo habilis, whose 600 cm^{3} (37 cu in) brain was slightly larger than that of chimpanzees. This evolution continued in Homo erectus with 800–1,100 cm^{3} (49–67 cu in), and reached a maximum in Neanderthals with 1,200–1,900 cm^{3} (73–116 cu in), larger even than modern Homo sapiens. This brain increase manifested during postnatal brain growth, far exceeding that of other apes (heterochrony). It also allowed for extended periods of social learning and language acquisition in juvenile humans, beginning as much as 2 million years ago. Encephalization may be due to a dependency on calorie-dense, difficult-to-acquire food.

Furthermore, the changes in the structure of human brains may be even more significant than the increase in size. Fossilized skulls shows the brain size in early humans fell within the range of modern humans 300,000 years ago, but only got its present-day brain shape between 100,000 and 35,000 years ago.

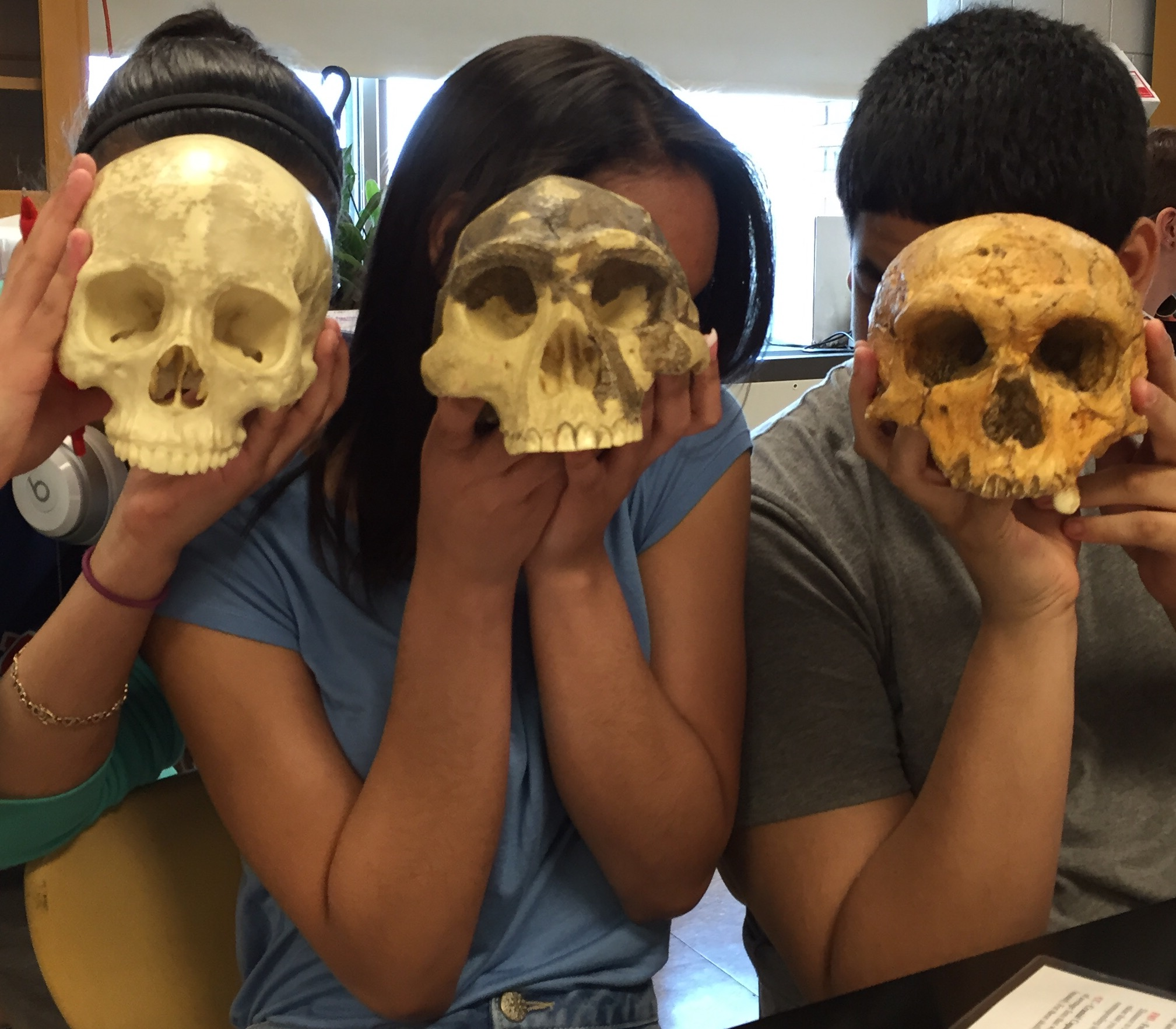
The size and shape of the skull changed over time. The leftmost, and largest, is a replica of a modern human skull.

The temporal lobes, which contain centers for language processing, have increased disproportionately, as has the prefrontal cortex, which has been related to complex decision-making and moderating social behavior. Encephalization has been tied to increased starches and meat in the diet, however a 2022 meta study called into question the role of meat. Other factors are the development of cooking, and it has been proposed that intelligence increased as a response to an increased necessity for solving social problems as human society became more complex. Changes in skull morphology, such as smaller mandibles and mandible muscle attachments, allowed more room for the brain to grow.

The increase in volume of the neocortex also included a rapid increase in size of the cerebellum. Its function has traditionally been associated with balance and fine motor control, but more recently with speech and cognition. The great apes, including hominids, had a more pronounced cerebellum relative to the neocortex than other primates. It has been suggested that because of its function of sensory-motor control and learning complex muscular actions, the cerebellum may have underpinned human technological adaptations, including the preconditions of speech.

The immediate survival advantage of encephalization is difficult to discern, as the major brain changes from Homo erectus to Homo heidelbergensis were not accompanied by major changes in technology. It has been suggested that the changes were mainly social and behavioural, including increased empathic abilities, increases in size of social groups, and increased behavioral plasticity. Humans are unique in the ability to acquire information through social transmission and adapt that information. The emerging field of cultural evolution studies human sociocultural change from an evolutionary perspective.

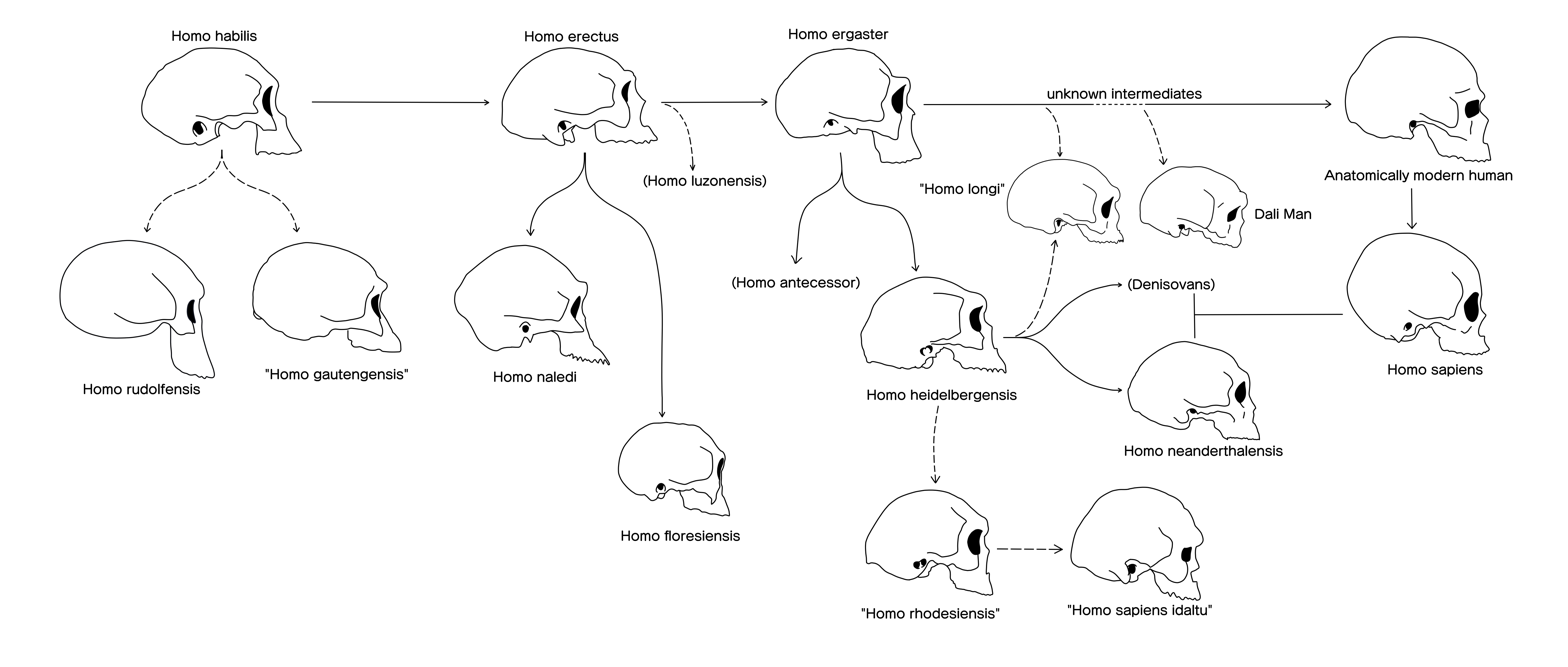
Evolution of the shape, size, and contours of the human (Homo) skull (Note: H. erectus in the narrow sense (the Asian species) was extinct by 140,000 years ago, Homo erectus soloensis, found in Java, is considered the latest known survival of H. erectus. Formerly dated to as late as 50,000 to 40,000 years ago, a 2011 study pushed back the date of its extinction of H. e. soloensis to 143,000 years ago at the latest, more likely before 550,000 years ago.)

=== Sexual dimorphism ===
The reduced degree of sexual dimorphism in humans is visible primarily in the reduction of the male canine tooth relative to other ape species (except gibbons) and reduced brow ridges and general robustness of males. Another important physiological change related to sexuality in humans was the evolution of hidden estrus. Humans are the only hominoids in which the female is fertile year round and in which no special signals of fertility are produced by the body (such as genital swelling or overt changes in proceptivity during estrus).

Nonetheless, humans retain a degree of sexual dimorphism in the distribution of body hair and subcutaneous fat, and in the overall size, males being around 15% larger than females. These changes taken together have been interpreted as a result of an increased emphasis on pair bonding as a possible solution to the requirement for increased parental investment due to the prolonged infancy of offspring.

=== Ulnar opposition ===
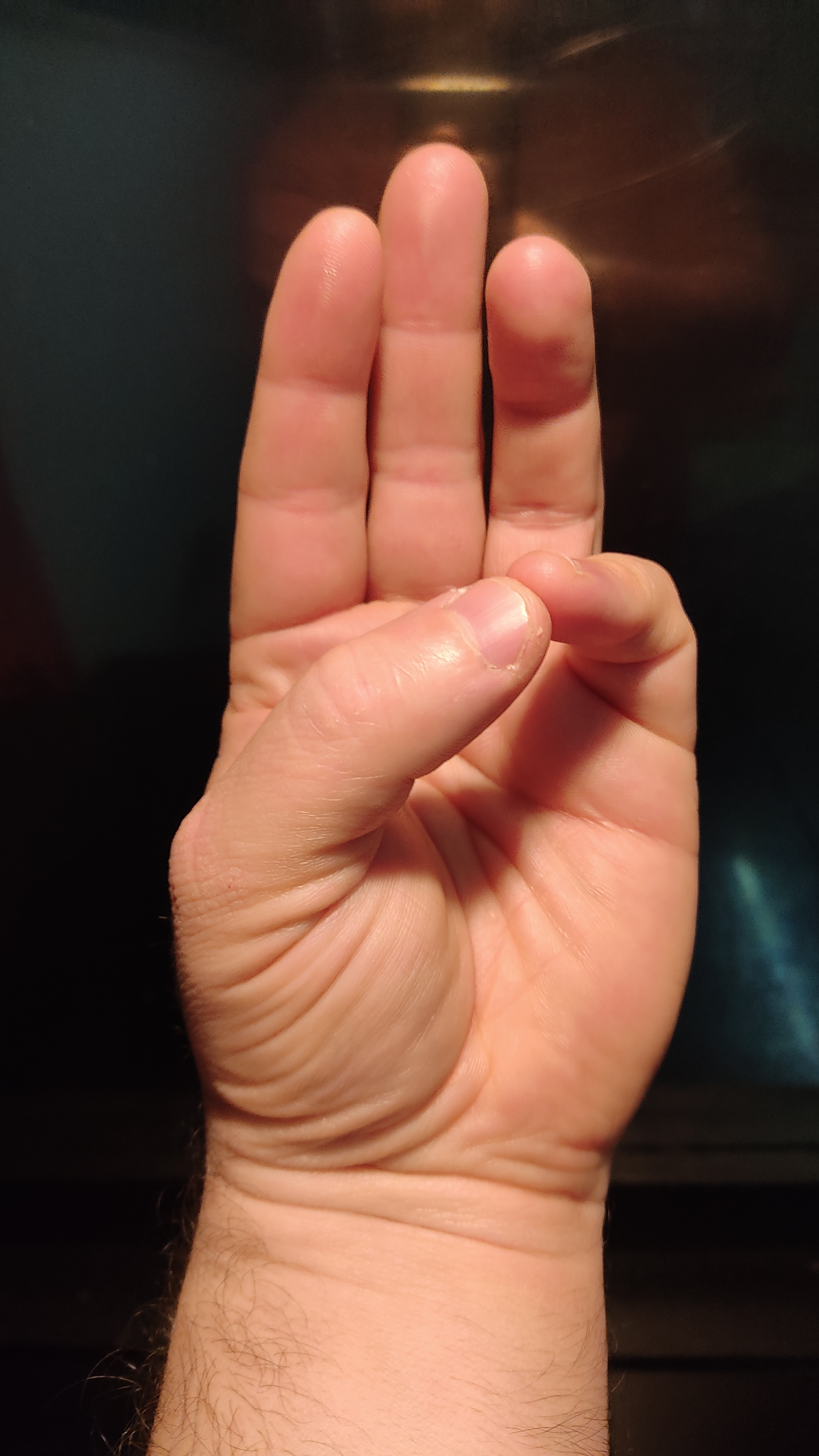
Only the human is able to touch the little finger with the thumb.

The ulnar opposition—the contact between the thumb and the tip of the little finger of the same hand—is unique to the genus Homo, including Neanderthals, the Sima de los Huesos hominins and anatomically modern humans. In other primates, the thumb is short and unable to touch the little finger. The ulnar opposition facilitates the precision grip and power grip of the human hand, underlying all the skilled manipulations.

=== Other changes ===
A number of other changes have also characterized the evolution of humans, among them an increased reliance on vision rather than smell (highly reduced olfactory bulb); a longer juvenile developmental period and higher infant dependency; a smaller gut and small, misaligned teeth; faster basal metabolism; loss of body hair; an increase in eccrine sweat gland density that is ten times higher than any other catarrhinian primates, yet humans use 30% to 50% less water per day compared to chimps and gorillas; more REM sleep but less sleep in total; a change in the shape of the dental arcade from u-shaped to parabolic; development of a chin (found in Homo sapiens alone); styloid processes; and a descended larynx. As the human hand and arms adapted to the making of tools and were used less for climbing, the shoulder blades changed too. As a side effect, it allowed human ancestors to throw objects with greater force, speed and accuracy.

== Use of tools ==
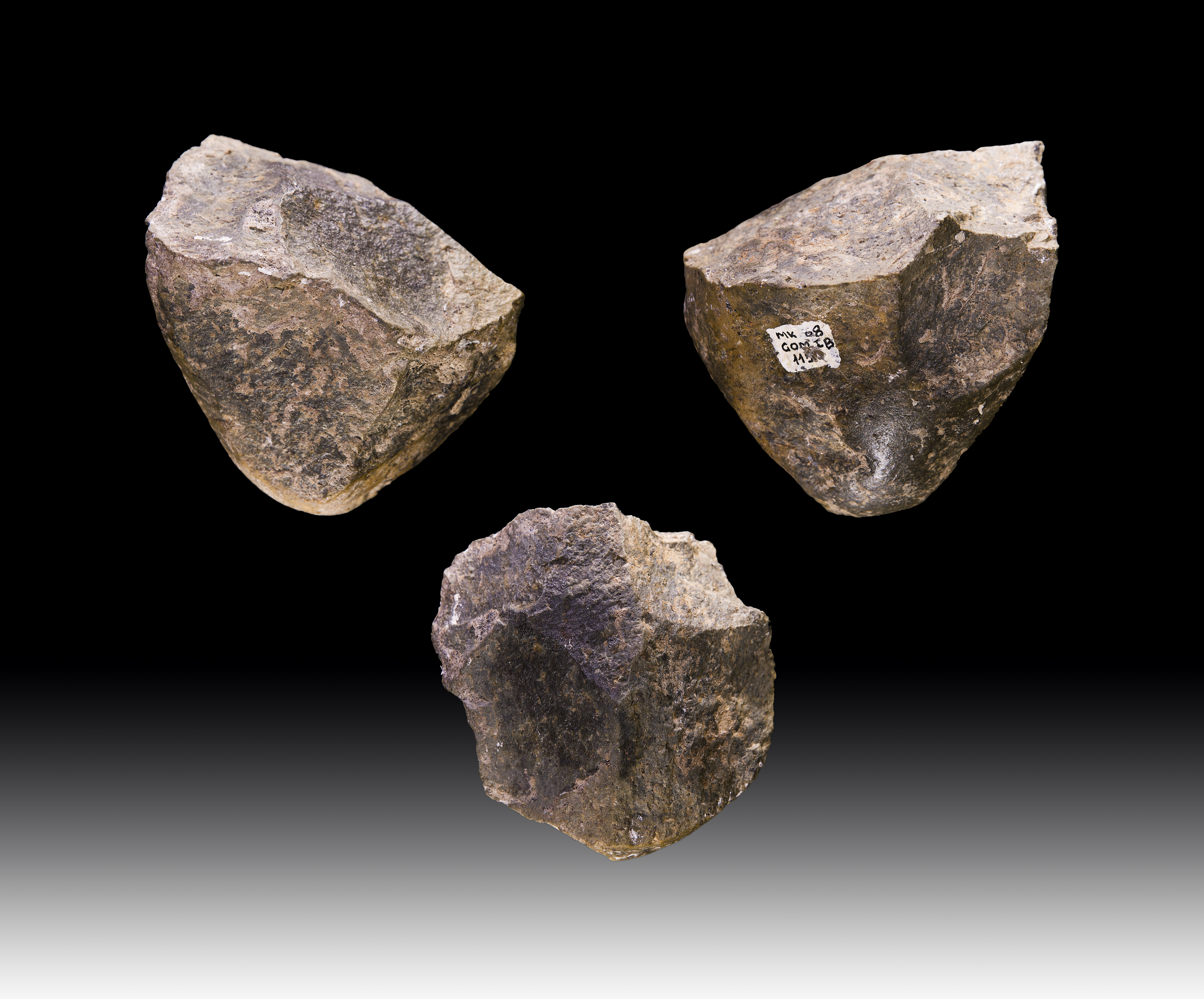
"A sharp rock", an Oldowan pebble tool, the most basic of human stone tools

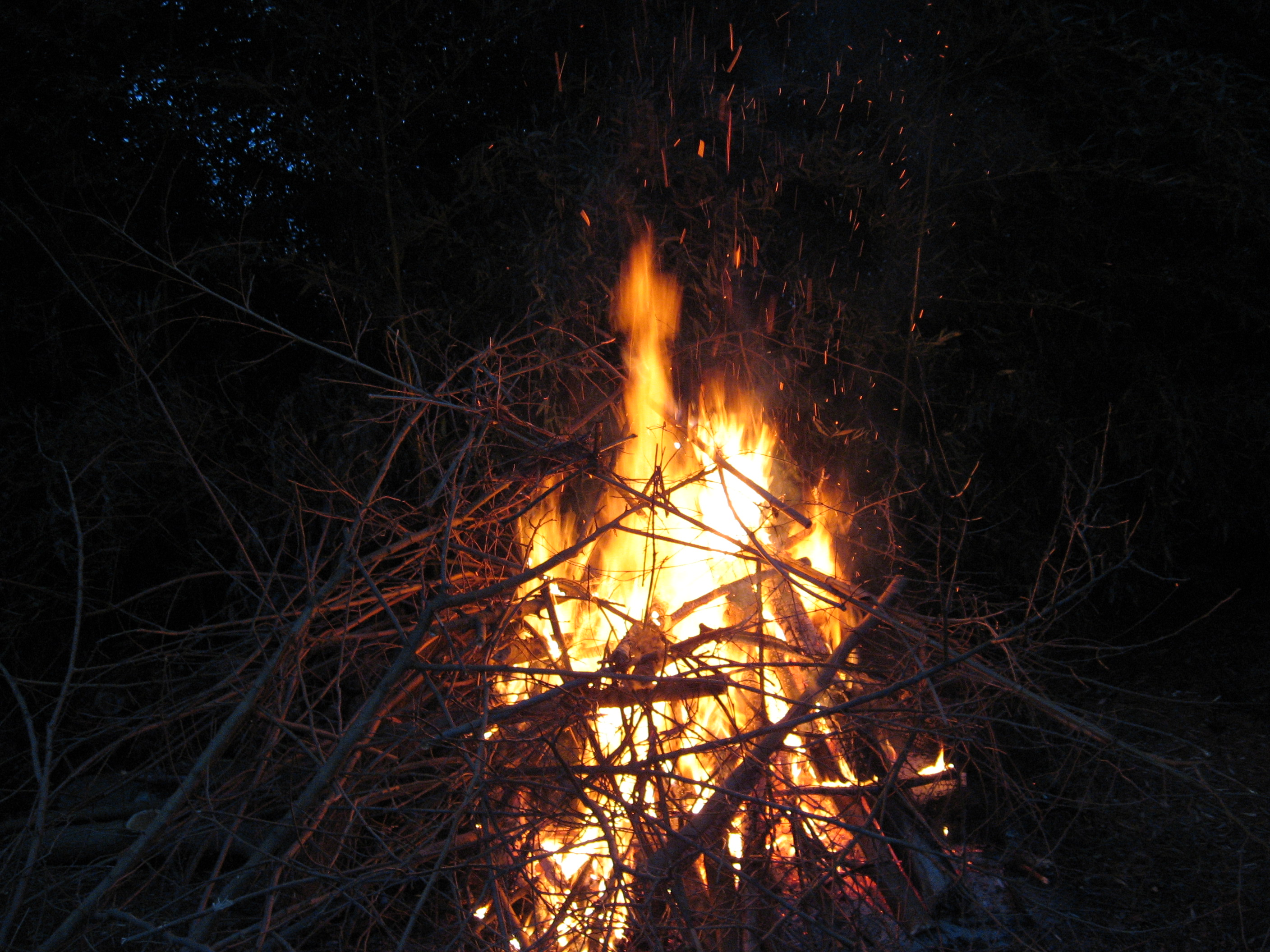
The harnessing of fire was a pivotal milestone in human history.

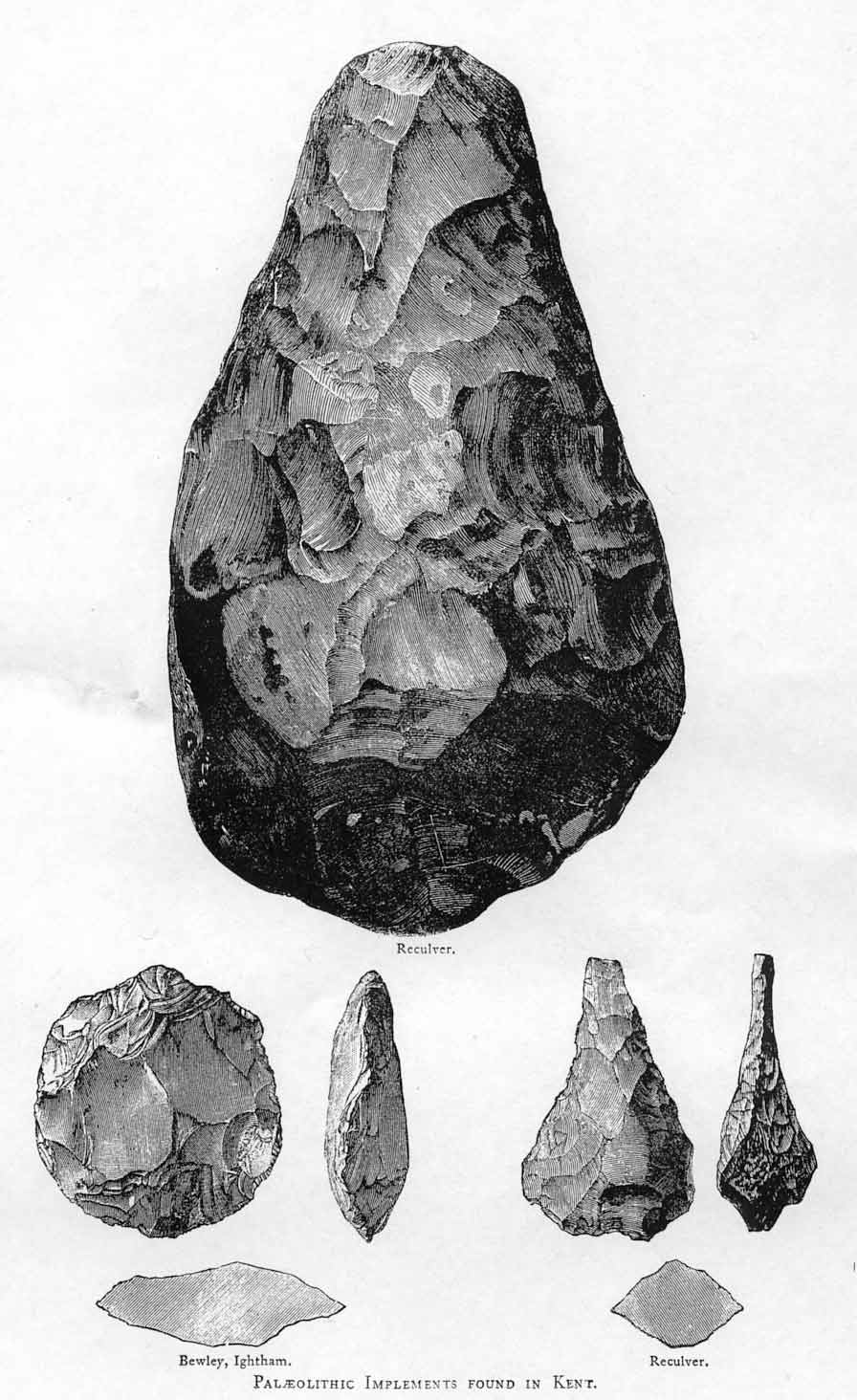
Acheulean hand-axes from Kent. H. erectus flint work. The types shown are (clockwise from top) cordate, ficron and ovate.

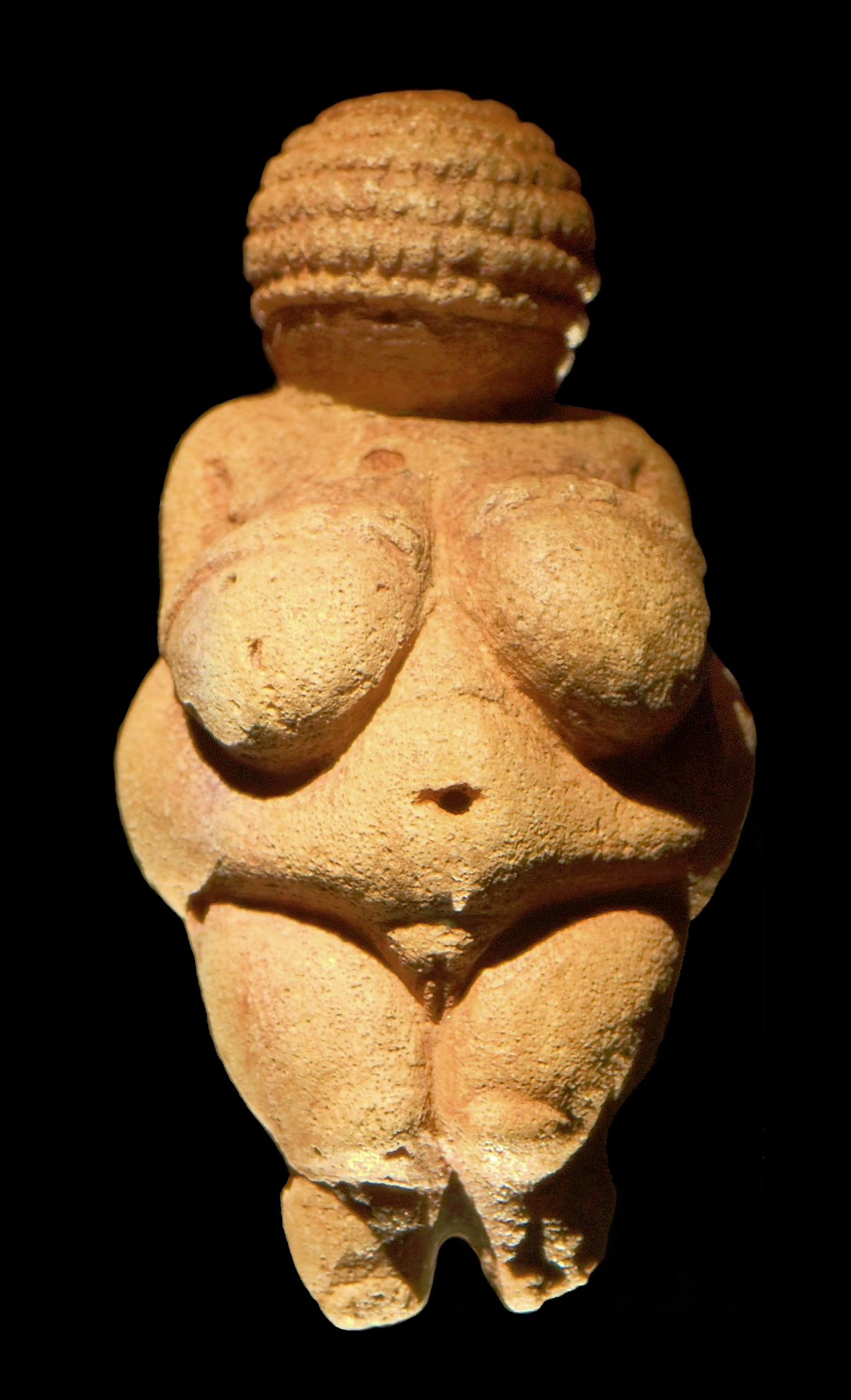
Venus of Willendorf, an example of Paleolithic art, dated circa 30,000 years ago

The use of tools has been interpreted as a sign of intelligence, and it has been theorized that tool use may have stimulated certain aspects of human evolution, especially the continued expansion of the human brain. Paleontology has yet to explain the expansion of this organ over millions of years despite being extremely demanding in terms of energy consumption. The brain of a modern human consumes, on average, about 13 watts (260 kilocalories per day), a fifth of the body's resting power consumption. Increased tool use would allow hunting for energy-rich meat products, and would enable processing more energy-rich plant products. Researchers have suggested that early hominins were thus under evolutionary pressure to increase their capacity to create and use tools.

Precisely when early humans started to use tools is difficult to determine, because the more primitive these tools are (for example, sharp-edged stones) the more difficult it is to decide whether they are natural objects or human artifacts. There is some evidence that the australopithecines (4 Ma) may have used broken bones as tools, but this is debated.

Many species make and use tools, but it is the human genus that dominates the areas of making and using more complex tools. The oldest known tools are flakes from West Turkana, Kenya, which date to 3.3 million years ago. The next oldest stone tools are from Gona, Ethiopia, and are considered the beginning of the Oldowan technology. These tools date to about 2.6 million years ago. A Homo fossil was found near some Oldowan tools, and its age was noted at 2.3 million years old, suggesting that maybe the Homo species did indeed create and use these tools. It is a possibility but does not yet represent solid evidence. The third metacarpal styloid process enables the hand bone to lock into the wrist bones, allowing for greater amounts of pressure to be applied to the wrist and hand from a grasping thumb and fingers. It allows humans the dexterity and strength to make and use complex tools. This unique anatomical feature separates humans from other apes and other nonhuman primates, and is not seen in human fossils older than 1.8 million years.

Bernard Wood noted that Paranthropus co-existed with the early Homo species in the area of the "Oldowan Industrial Complex" over roughly the same span of time. Although there is no direct evidence which identifies Paranthropus as the tool makers, their anatomy lends to indirect evidence of their capabilities in this area. Most paleoanthropologists agree that the early Homo species were indeed responsible for most of the Oldowan tools found. They argue that when most of the Oldowan tools were found in association with human fossils, Homo was always present, but Paranthropus was not.

In 1994, Randall Susman used the anatomy of opposable thumbs as the basis for his argument that both the Homo and Paranthropus species were toolmakers. He compared bones and muscles of human and chimpanzee thumbs, finding that humans have 3 muscles which are lacking in chimpanzees. Humans also have thicker metacarpals with broader heads, allowing more precise grasping than the chimpanzee hand can perform. Susman posited that modern anatomy of the human opposable thumb is an evolutionary response to the requirements associated with making and handling tools and that both species were indeed toolmakers.

== Transition to behavioral modernity ==
Anthropologists describe modern human behavior to include cultural and behavioral traits such as specialization of tools, use of jewellery and images (such as cave drawings), organization of living space, rituals (such as grave gifts), specialized hunting techniques, exploration of less hospitable geographical areas, and barter trade networks, as well as more general traits such as language and complex symbolic thinking. Debate continues as to whether a "revolution" led to modern humans ("big bang of human consciousness"), or whether the evolution was more gradual.

Until about 50,000–40,000 years ago, the use of stone tools seems to have progressed stepwise. Each phase (H. habilis, H. ergaster, H. neanderthalensis) marked a new technology, followed by very slow development until the next phase. Currently paleoanthropologists are debating whether these Homo species possessed some or many modern human behaviors. They seem to have been culturally conservative, maintaining the same technologies and foraging patterns over very long periods.

Around 50,000 BP, human culture started to evolve more rapidly. The transition to behavioral modernity has been characterized by some as a "Great Leap Forward", or as the "Upper Palaeolithic Revolution", due to the sudden appearance in the archaeological record of distinctive signs of modern behavior and big game hunting. Evidence of behavioral modernity significantly earlier also exists from Africa, with older evidence of abstract imagery, widened subsistence strategies, more sophisticated tools and weapons, and other "modern" behaviors, and many scholars have recently argued that the transition to modernity occurred sooner than previously believed.

Other scholars consider the transition to have been more gradual, noting that some features had already appeared among archaic African Homo sapiens 300,000–200,000 years ago. Recent evidence suggests that the Australian Aboriginal population separated from the African population 75,000 years ago, and that they made a 160 km (99 mi) sea journey 60,000 years ago, which may diminish the significance of the Upper Paleolithic Revolution.

Modern humans started burying their dead, making clothing from animal hides, hunting with more sophisticated techniques (such as using pit traps or driving animals off cliffs), and cave painting. As human culture advanced, different populations innovated existing technologies: artifacts such as fish hooks, buttons, and bone needles show signs of cultural variation, which had not been seen prior to 50,000 BP. Typically, the older H. neanderthalensis populations did not vary in their technologies, although the Chatelperronian assemblages have been found to be Neanderthal imitations of H. sapiens Aurignacian technologies.

== Recent and ongoing human evolution ==
Anatomically modern human populations continue to evolve, as they are affected by both natural selection and genetic drift. Although selection pressure on some traits, such as resistance to smallpox, has decreased in the modern age, humans are still undergoing natural selection for many other traits. Some of these are due to specific environmental pressures, while others are related to lifestyle changes since the development of agriculture (10,000 years ago), urbanization (5,000), and industrialization (250 years ago). It has been argued that human evolution has accelerated since the development of agriculture 10,000 years ago and civilization some 5,000 years ago, resulting, it is claimed, in substantial genetic differences between different current human populations, and more recent research indicates that for some traits, the developments and innovations of human culture have driven a new form of selection that coexists with, and in some cases has largely replaced, natural selection.

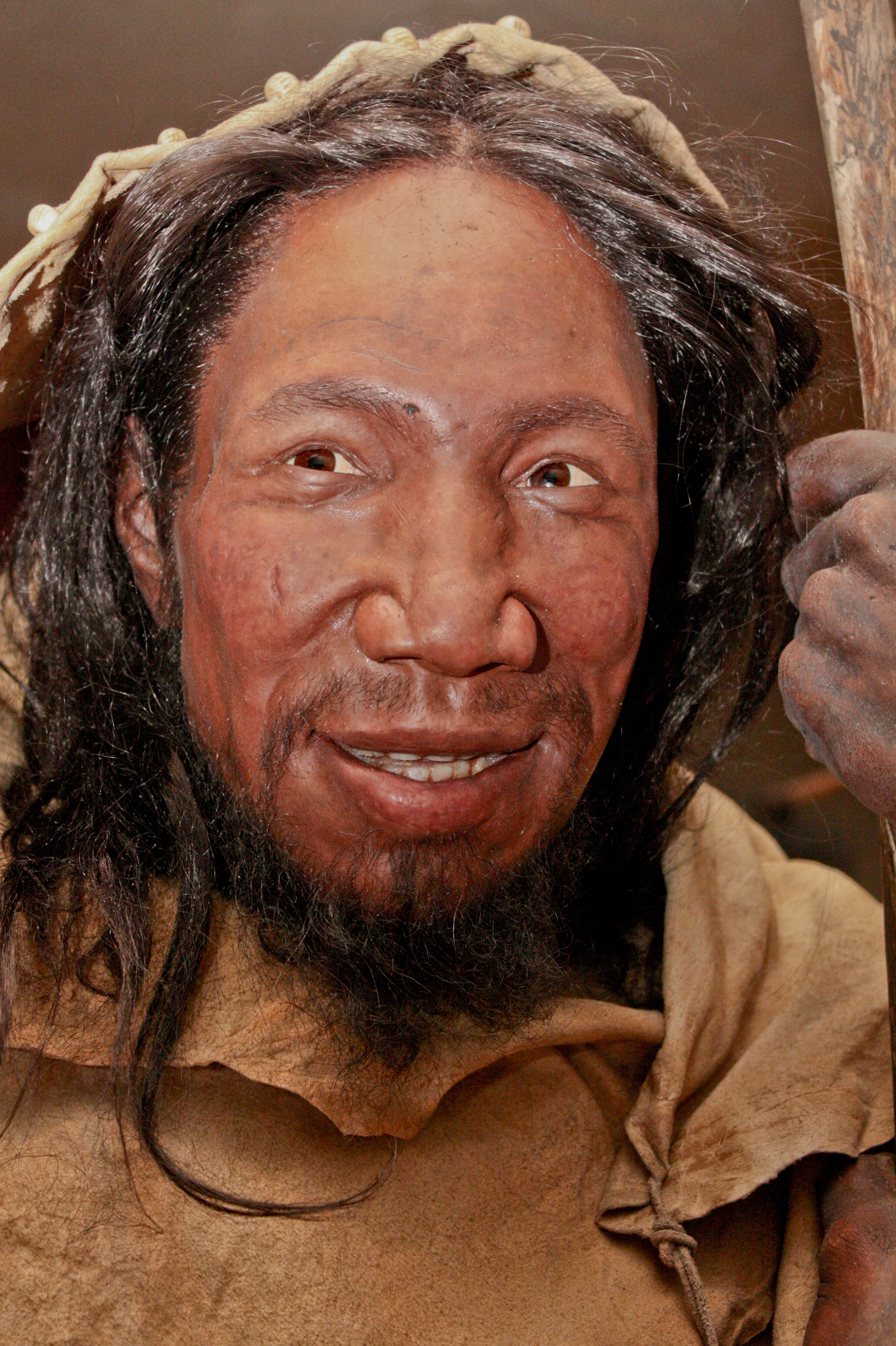
Reconstruction of the upper Palaeolithic human Oase 2 c. 40 000 years BP

Particularly conspicuous is variation in superficial characteristics, such as Afro-textured hair, or the recent evolution of light skin and blond hair in some populations, which are attributed to differences in climate. Particularly strong selective pressures have resulted in high-altitude adaptation in humans, with different ones in different isolated populations. Studies of the genetic basis show that some developed very recently, with Tibetans evolving over 3,000 years to have high proportions of an allele of EPAS1 that is adaptive to high altitudes.

Other evolution is related to endemic diseases: the presence of malaria selects for sickle cell trait (the heterozygous form of sickle cell gene), while in the absence of malaria, the health effects of sickle-cell anemia select against this trait. For another example, the population at risk of the severe debilitating disease kuru has significant over-representation of an immune variant of the prion protein gene G127V versus non-immune alleles. The frequency of this genetic variant is due to the survival of immune persons. Some reported trends remain unexplained and the subject of ongoing research in the novel field of evolutionary medicine: for example, polyendocrine metabolic ovarian syndrome (PMOS) reduces fertility and thus is expected to be subject to extremely strong negative selection, but its relative commonality in human populations suggests a counteracting selection pressure. The identity of that pressure remains the subject of some debate.

Recent human evolution related to agriculture includes genetic resistance to infectious disease that has appeared in human populations by crossing the species barrier from domesticated animals, as well as changes in metabolism due to changes in diet, such as lactase persistence.

Culturally-driven evolution can defy the expectations of natural selection: while human populations experience some pressure that drives a selection for producing children at younger ages, the advent of effective contraception, higher education, and changing social norms have driven the observed selection in the opposite direction. However, culturally-driven selection need not necessarily work counter or in opposition to natural selection: some proposals to explain the high rate of recent human brain expansion indicate a kind of feedback whereupon the brain's increased social learning efficiency encourages cultural developments that in turn encourage more efficiency, which drive more complex cultural developments that demand still-greater efficiency, and so forth. Culturally-driven evolution has an advantage in that in addition to the genetic effects, it can be observed also in the archaeological record: the development of stone tools across the Palaeolithic period connects to culturally-driven cognitive development in the form of skill acquisition supported by the culture and the development of increasingly complex technologies and the cognitive ability to elaborate them.

In contemporary times, since industrialization, some trends have been observed: for instance, menopause is evolving to occur later. Other reported trends appear to include lengthening of the human reproductive period and reduction in cholesterol levels, blood glucose and blood pressure in some populations.

== History of study ==
=== Before Darwin ===
The name Homo of the biological genus to which humans belong is Latin for 'human'. (Note: The Latin word which refers to adult males only is vir) It was chosen originally by Carl Linnaeus in his classification system. (Note: See the Binomial nomenclature and Systema Naturae articles.) The English word human is from the Latin humanus, the adjectival form of homo. The Latin homo derives from the Indo-European root *dhghem, or 'earth'. Linnaeus and other scientists of his time also considered the great apes to be the closest relatives of humans based on morphological and anatomical similarities.

=== Darwin ===
The possibility of linking humans with earlier apes by descent became clear only after 1859 with the publication of Charles Darwin's On the Origin of Species, in which he argued for the idea of the evolution of new species from earlier ones. Darwin's book did not address the question of human evolution, saying only that "Light will be thrown on the origin of man and his history."

The first debates about the nature of human evolution arose between Thomas Henry Huxley and Richard Owen. Huxley argued for human evolution from apes by illustrating many of the similarities and differences between humans and other apes, and did so particularly in his 1863 book Evidence as to Man's Place in Nature. Many of Darwin's early supporters (such as Alfred Russel Wallace and Charles Lyell) did not initially agree that the origin of the mental capacities and the moral sensibilities of humans could be explained by natural selection, though this later changed. Darwin applied the theory of evolution and sexual selection to humans in his 1871 book The Descent of Man, and Selection in Relation to Sex.

=== First fossils ===
A major problem in the 19th century was the lack of fossil intermediaries. Neanderthal remains were discovered in a limestone quarry in 1856, three years before the publication of On the Origin of Species, and Neanderthal fossils had been discovered in Gibraltar even earlier, but it was originally claimed that these were the remains of a modern human who had suffered some kind of illness. Despite the 1891 discovery by Eugène Dubois of what is now called Homo erectus at Trinil, Java, it was only in the 1920s when such fossils were discovered in Africa, that intermediate species began to accumulate. In 1925, Raymond Dart described Australopithecus africanus. The type specimen was the Taung Child, an australopithecine infant which was discovered in a cave. The child's remains were a remarkably well-preserved tiny skull and an endocast of the brain.

Although the brain was small (410 cm^{3}), its shape was rounded, unlike that of chimpanzees and gorillas, and more like a modern human brain. Also, the specimen showed short canine teeth, and the position of the foramen magnum (the hole in the skull where the spine enters) was evidence of bipedal locomotion. All of these traits convinced Dart that the Taung Child was a bipedal human ancestor, a transitional form between apes and humans.

=== The East African fossils ===
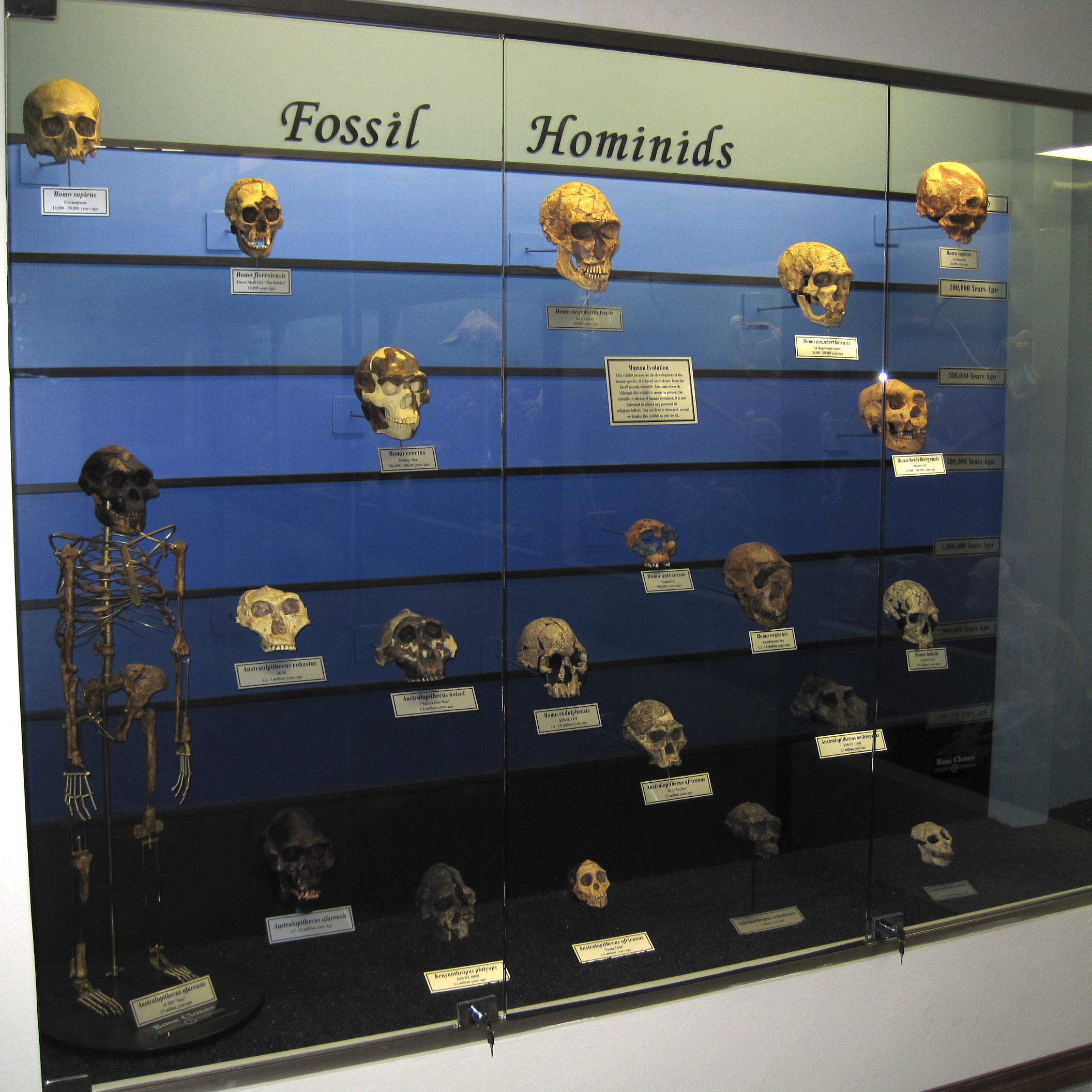
Fossil hominid evolution display at The Museum of Osteology, Oklahoma City, Oklahoma, US

During the 1960s and 1970s, hundreds of fossils were found in East Africa in the regions of the Olduvai Gorge and Lake Turkana. These searches were carried out by the Leakey family, with Louis Leakey and his wife Mary Leakey, and later their son Richard and daughter-in-law Meave, fossil hunters and paleoanthropologists. From the fossil beds of Olduvai and Lake Turkana they amassed specimens of the early hominins: the australopithecines and Homo species, and even H. erectus.

These finds cemented Africa as the cradle of humankind. In the late 1970s and the 1980s, Ethiopia emerged as the new hot spot of paleoanthropology after "Lucy", the most complete fossil member of the species Australopithecus afarensis, was found in 1974 by Donald Johanson near Hadar in the desertic Afar Triangle region of northern Ethiopia. Although the specimen had a small brain, the pelvis and leg bones were almost identical in function to those of modern humans, showing with certainty that these hominins had walked erect. Lucy was classified as a new species, Australopithecus afarensis, which is thought to be more closely related to the genus Homo as a direct ancestor, or as a close relative of an unknown ancestor, than any other known hominid or hominin from this early time range. (The specimen was nicknamed "Lucy" after the Beatles' song "Lucy in the Sky with Diamonds", which was played loudly and repeatedly in the camp during the excavations.) The Afar Triangle area would later yield discovery of many more hominin fossils, particularly those uncovered or described by teams headed by Tim D. White in the 1990s, including Ardipithecus ramidus and A. kadabba.

In 2013, fossil skeletons of Homo naledi, an extinct species of hominin assigned (provisionally) to the genus Homo, were found in the Rising Star Cave system, a site in South Africa's Cradle of Humankind region in Gauteng province near Johannesburg. As of September 2015, fossils of at least fifteen individuals, amounting to 1,550 specimens, have been excavated from the cave. The species is characterized by a body mass and stature similar to small-bodied human populations, a smaller endocranial volume similar to Australopithecus, and a cranial morphology (skull shape) similar to early Homo species. The skeletal anatomy combines primitive features known from australopithecines with features known from early hominins. The individuals show signs of having been deliberately disposed of within the cave near the time of death. The fossils were dated close to 250,000 years ago, and thus are not ancestral to but contemporary with the first appearance of larger-brained anatomically modern humans.

=== The genetic revolution ===
The genetic revolution in studies of human evolution started when Vincent Sarich and Allan Wilson measured the strength of immunological cross-reactions of blood serum albumin between pairs of creatures, including humans and African apes (chimpanzees and gorillas). The strength of the reaction could be expressed numerically as an immunological distance, which was in turn proportional to the number of amino acid differences between homologous proteins in different species. By constructing a calibration curve of the ID of species' pairs with known divergence times in the fossil record, the data could be used as a molecular clock to estimate the times of divergence of pairs with poorer or unknown fossil records.

In their seminal 1967 paper in Science, Sarich and Wilson estimated the divergence time of humans and apes as four to five million years ago, at a time when standard interpretations of the fossil record gave this divergence as at least 10 to as much as 30 million years. Subsequent fossil discoveries, notably "Lucy", and reinterpretation of older fossil materials, notably Ramapithecus, showed the younger estimates to be correct and validated the albumin method.

Progress in DNA sequencing, specifically mitochondrial DNA (mtDNA) and then Y-chromosome DNA (Y-DNA) advanced the understanding of human origins. Application of the molecular clock principle revolutionized the study of molecular evolution.

On the basis of a separation from the orangutan between 10 and 20 million years ago, earlier studies of the molecular clock suggested that there were about 76 mutations per generation that were not inherited by human children from their parents; this evidence supported the divergence time between hominins and chimpanzees noted above. However, a 2012 study in Iceland of 78 children and their parents suggests a mutation rate of only 36 mutations per generation; this datum extends the separation between humans and chimpanzees to an earlier period greater than 7 million years ago (Ma). Additional research with 226 offspring of wild chimpanzee populations in eight locations suggests that chimpanzees reproduce at age 26.5 years on average; which suggests the human divergence from chimpanzees occurred between 7 and 13 mya. And these data suggest that Ardipithecus (4.5 Ma), Orrorin (6 Ma) and Sahelanthropus (7 Ma) all may be on the hominid lineage, and even that the separation may have occurred outside the East African Rift region.

Furthermore, analysis of the two species' genes in 2006 provides evidence that after human ancestors had started to diverge from chimpanzees, interspecies mating between "proto-human" and "proto-chimpanzees" nonetheless occurred regularly enough to change certain genes in the new gene pool:

A new comparison of the human and chimpanzee genomes suggests that after the two lineages separated, they may have begun interbreeding... A principal finding is that the X chromosomes of humans and chimpanzees appear to have diverged about 1.2 million years more recently than the other chromosomes.

The research suggests:

There were in fact two splits between the human and chimpanzee lineages, with the first being followed by interbreeding between the two populations and then a second split. The suggestion of a hybridization has startled paleoanthropologists, who nonetheless are treating the new genetic data seriously.

=== The quest for the earliest hominin ===
In the 1990s, several teams of paleoanthropologists were working throughout Africa looking for evidence of the earliest divergence of the hominin lineage from the great apes. In 1994, Meave Leakey discovered Australopithecus anamensis. The find was overshadowed by Tim D. White's 1995 discovery of Ardipithecus ramidus, which pushed back the fossil record to 4.2 million years ago.

In 2000, Martin Pickford and Brigitte Senut discovered, in the Tugen Hills of Kenya, a 6-million-year-old bipedal hominin which they named Orrorin tugenensis. And in 2001, a team led by Michel Brunet discovered the skull of Sahelanthropus tchadensis which was dated as 7.2 million years ago, and which Brunet argued was a bipedal, and therefore a hominid—that is, a hominin (cf Hominidae; terms "hominids" and hominins).

=== Human dispersal ===
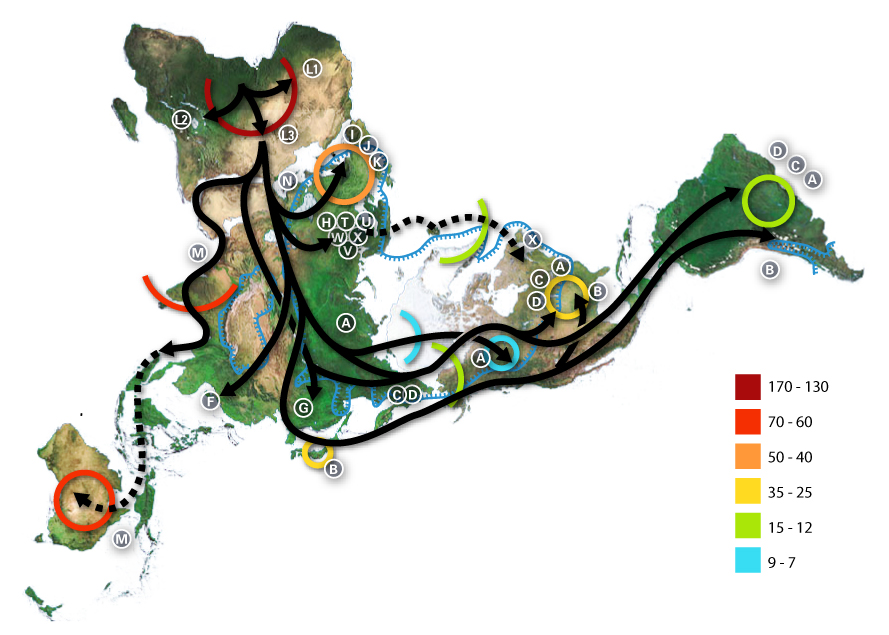
A global mapping model of human migration, based from divergence of the mitochondrial DNA (which indicates the matrilineage). Timescale (ka) indicated by colours.

A "trellis" (as Milford H. Wolpoff called it) that emphasizes back-and-forth gene flow among geographic regions

Different models for the beginning of the present human species

Anthropologists in the 1980s were divided regarding some details of reproductive barriers and migratory dispersals of the genus Homo. Subsequently, genetics has been used to investigate and resolve these issues. According to the Sahara pump theory evidence suggests that the genus Homo have migrated out of Africa at least three and possibly four times (e.g. Homo erectus, Homo heidelbergensis and two or three times for Homo sapiens). Recent evidence suggests these dispersals are closely related to fluctuating periods of climate change.

Recent evidence suggests that humans may have left Africa half a million years earlier than previously thought. A joint Franco-Indian team has found human artifacts in the Siwalk Hills north of New Delhi dating back at least 2.6 million years. This is earlier than the previous earliest finding of genus Homo at Dmanisi, in Georgia, dating to 1.85 million years. Although controversial, tools found at a Chinese cave strengthen the case that humans used tools as far back as 2.48 million years ago. This suggests that the Asian "Chopper" tool tradition, found in Java and northern China may have left Africa before the appearance of the Acheulian hand axe.

==== Dispersal of modern Homo sapiens ====
Up until the genetic evidence became available, there were two dominant models for the dispersal of modern humans. The multiregional hypothesis proposed that the genus Homo contained only a single interconnected population as it does today (not separate species), and that its evolution took place worldwide continuously over the last couple of million years. This model was proposed in 1988 by Milford H. Wolpoff. In contrast, the "out of Africa" model proposed that modern H. sapiens speciated in Africa recently (that is, approximately 200,000 years ago) and the subsequent migration through Eurasia resulted in the nearly complete replacement of other Homo species. This model has been developed by Chris Stringer and Peter Andrews.

Sequencing mtDNA and Y-DNA sampled from a wide range of indigenous populations revealed ancestral information relating to both male and female genetic heritage, and strengthened the "out of Africa" theory and weakened the views of multiregional evolutionism. Aligned in genetic tree differences were interpreted as supportive of a recent single origin.

"Out of Africa" has thus gained much support from research using female mitochondrial DNA and the male Y chromosome. After analysing genealogy trees constructed using 133 types of mtDNA, researchers concluded that all were descended from a female African progenitor, dubbed Mitochondrial Eve. "Out of Africa" is also supported by the fact that mitochondrial genetic diversity is highest among African populations.

A broad study of African genetic diversity, headed by Sarah Tishkoff, found the San people had the greatest genetic diversity among the 113 distinct populations sampled, making them one of 14 "ancestral population clusters". The research also located a possible origin of modern human migration in southwestern Africa, near the coastal border of Namibia and Angola. The fossil evidence was insufficient for archaeologist Richard Leakey to resolve the debate about exactly where in Africa modern humans first appeared. Studies of haplogroups in Y-chromosomal DNA and mitochondrial DNA have largely supported a recent African origin. All the evidence from autosomal DNA also predominantly supports a Recent African origin. However, evidence for archaic admixture in modern humans, both in Africa and later, throughout Eurasia has recently been suggested by a number of studies.

Recent sequencing of Neanderthal and Denisovan genomes shows that some admixture with these populations has occurred. All modern human groups outside Africa have 1–4% or (according to more recent research) about 1.5–2.6% Neanderthal alleles in their genome, and some Melanesians have an additional 4–6% of Denisovan alleles. These new results do not contradict the "out of Africa" model, except in its strictest interpretation, although they make the situation more complex. After recovery from a genetic bottleneck that some researchers speculate might be linked to the Toba supervolcano catastrophe, a fairly small group left Africa and interbred with Neanderthals, probably in the Middle East, on the Eurasian steppe or even in North Africa before their departure. Their still predominantly African descendants spread to populate the world. A fraction in turn interbred with Denisovans, probably in southeastern Asia, before populating Melanesia. HLA haplotypes of Neanderthal and Denisova origin have been identified in modern Eurasian and Oceanian populations. The Denisovan EPAS1 gene has also been found in Tibetan populations. Studies of the human genome using machine learning have identified additional genetic contributions in Eurasians from an "unknown" ancestral population potentially related to the Neanderthal-Denisovan lineage.

A map of early human migrations

There are still differing theories on whether there was a single exodus from Africa or several. A multiple dispersal model involves the Southern Dispersal theory, which has gained support in recent years from genetic, linguistic and archaeological evidence. In this theory, there was a coastal dispersal of modern humans from the Horn of Africa crossing the Bab el Mandib to Yemen at a lower sea level around 70,000 years ago. This group helped to populate Southeast Asia and Oceania, explaining the discovery of early human sites in these areas much earlier than those in the Levant. This group seems to have been dependent upon marine resources for their survival.

Stephen Oppenheimer has proposed a second wave of humans may have later dispersed through the Persian Gulf oases, and the Zagros mountains into the Middle East. Alternatively it may have come across the Sinai Peninsula into Asia, from shortly after 50,000 yrs BP, resulting in the bulk of the human populations of Eurasia. It has been suggested that this second group possibly possessed a more sophisticated "big game hunting" tool technology and was less dependent on coastal food sources than the original group. Much of the evidence for the first group's expansion would have been destroyed by the rising sea levels at the end of each glacial maximum. The multiple dispersal model is contradicted by studies indicating that the populations of Eurasia and the populations of Southeast Asia and Oceania are all descended from the same mitochondrial DNA L3 lineages, which support a single migration out of Africa that gave rise to all non-African populations.

On the basis of the early date of Badoshan Iranian Aurignacian, Oppenheimer suggests that this second dispersal may have occurred with a pluvial period about 50,000 years before the present, with modern human big-game hunting cultures spreading up the Zagros Mountains, carrying modern human genomes from Oman, throughout the Persian Gulf, northward into Armenia and Anatolia, with a variant travelling south into Israel and to Cyrenicia.

Recent genetic evidence suggests that all modern non-African populations, including those of Eurasia and Oceania, are descended from a single wave that left Africa between 65,000 and 50,000 years ago.

== Evidence ==
The evidence on which scientific accounts of human evolution are based comes from many fields of natural science. The main source of knowledge about the evolutionary process has traditionally been the fossil record, but since the development of genetics beginning in the 1970s, DNA analysis has come to occupy a place of comparable importance. The studies of ontogeny, phylogeny and especially evolutionary developmental biology of both vertebrates and invertebrates offer considerable insight into the evolution of all life, including how humans evolved. The specific study of the origin and life of humans is anthropology, particularly paleoanthropology which focuses on the study of human prehistory.

=== Evidence from genetics ===
Family tree showing the extant hominoids: humans (genus Homo), chimpanzees and bonobos (genus Pan), gorillas (genus Gorilla), orangutans (genus Pongo), and gibbons (four genera of the family Hylobatidae: Hylobates, Hoolock, Nomascus, and Symphalangus). All except gibbons are hominids.

The closest living relatives of humans are bonobos and chimpanzees (both genus Pan) and gorillas (genus Gorilla). With the sequencing of both the human and chimpanzee genome, as of 2012 estimates of the similarity between their DNA sequences range between 95% and 99%. It is also noteworthy that mice share around 97.5% of their working DNA with humans. By using the technique called the molecular clock which estimates the time required for the number of divergent mutations to accumulate between two lineages, the approximate date for the split between lineages can be calculated.

The gibbons (family Hylobatidae) and then the orangutans (genus Pongo) were the first groups to split from the line leading to the hominins, including humans—followed by gorillas (genus Gorilla), and, ultimately, by the chimpanzees (genus Pan). The splitting date between hominin and chimpanzee lineages is placed by some between 4 to 8 million years ago, that is, during the Late Miocene. Speciation, however, appears to have been unusually drawn out. Initial divergence occurred sometime between 7 to 13 million years ago, but ongoing hybridization blurred the separation and delayed complete separation during several millions of years. Patterson (2006) dated the final divergence at 5 to 6 million years ago.

Genetic evidence has also been employed to compare species within the genus Homo, investigating gene flow between early modern humans and Neanderthals, and to enhance the understanding of the early human migration patterns and splitting dates. By comparing the parts of the genome that are not under natural selection and which therefore accumulate mutations at a fairly steady rate, it is possible to reconstruct a genetic tree incorporating the entire human species since the last shared ancestor.

Each time a certain mutation (single-nucleotide polymorphism) appears in an individual and is passed on to his or her descendants, a haplogroup is formed including all of the descendants of the individual who will also carry that mutation. By comparing mitochondrial DNA which is inherited only from the mother, geneticists have concluded that the last female common ancestor whose genetic marker is found in all modern humans, the so-called mitochondrial Eve, must have lived around 200,000 years ago.

Human evolutionary genetics studies how human genomes differ among individuals, the evolutionary past that gave rise to them, and their current effects. Differences between genomes have anthropological, medical and forensic implications and applications. Genetic data can provide important insight into human evolution. Polygenic scores from ancient DNA showed directional selection for various traits including evolution of human intelligence in some periods.

In May 2023, scientists reported a more complicated pathway of human evolution than previously understood. According to the studies, humans evolved from different places and times in Africa, instead of from a single location and period of time.

=== Evidence from the fossil record ===
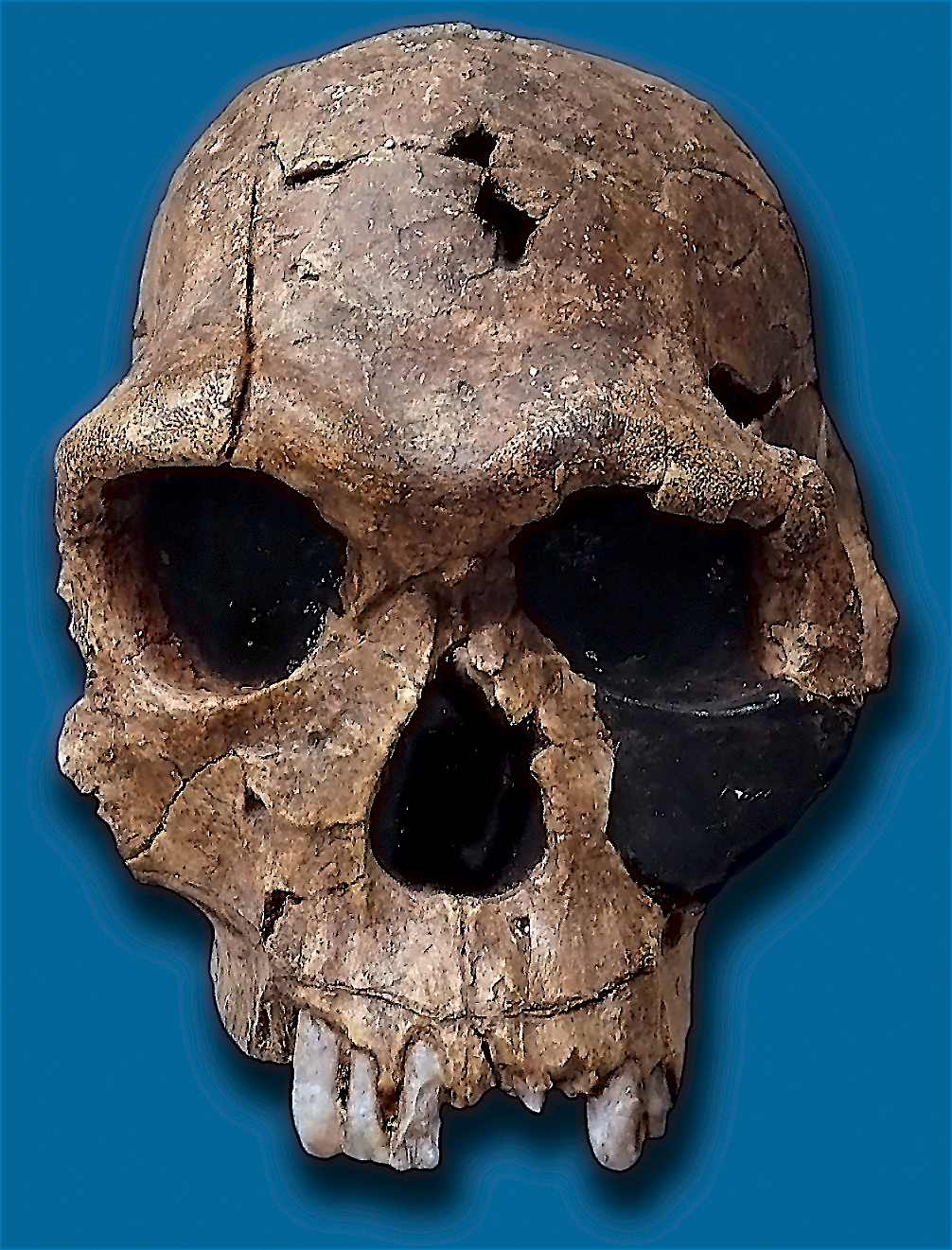
Replica of fossil skull of H. habilis. Fossil number KNM ER 1813, found at Koobi Fora, Kenya.

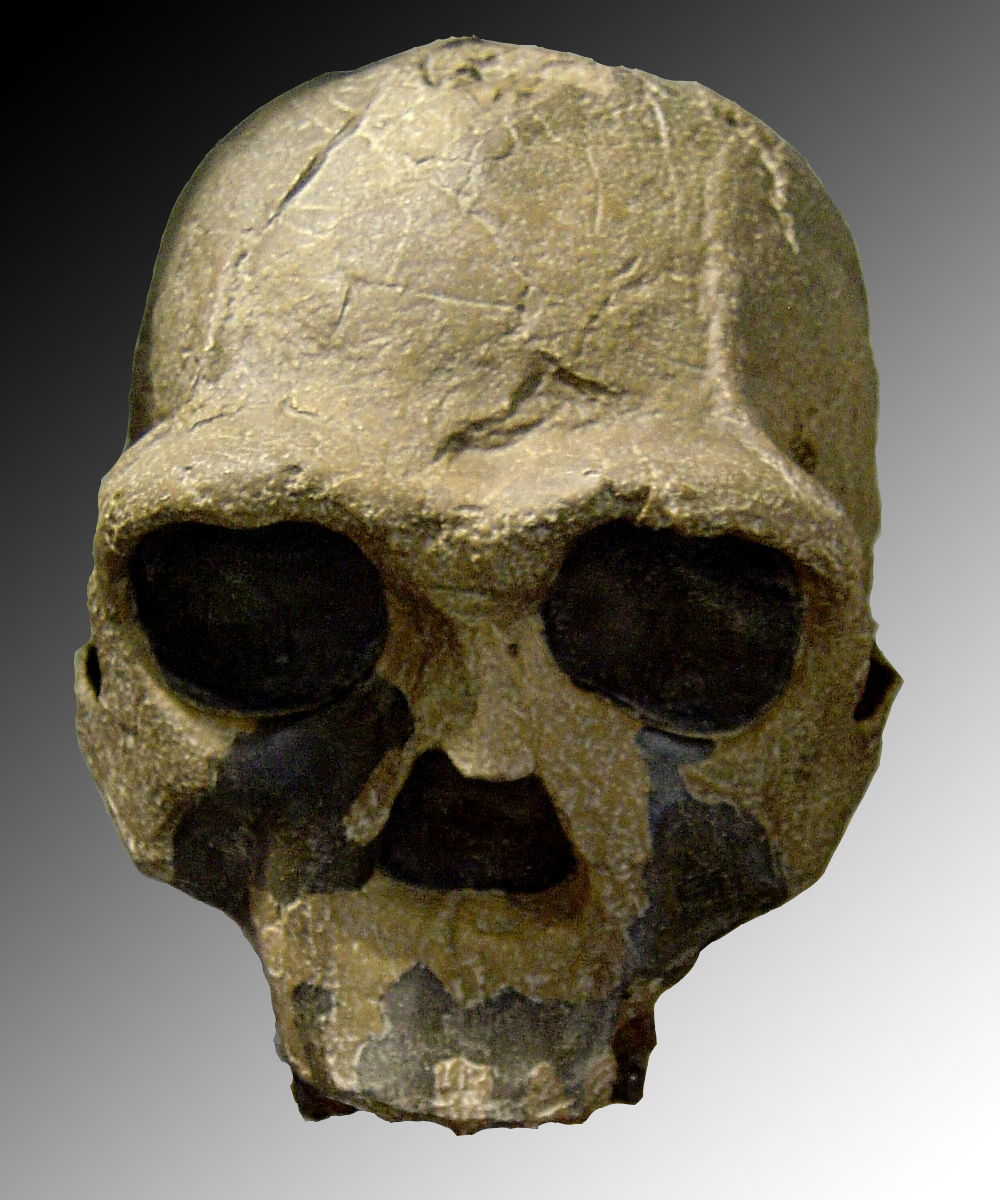
Replica of fossil skull of H. ergaster (African H. erectus). Fossil number Khm-Heu 3733 discovered in 1975 in Kenya.

There is little fossil evidence for the divergence of the gorilla, chimpanzee and hominin lineages. The earliest fossils that have been proposed as members of the hominin lineage are Sahelanthropus tchadensis dating from 7 million years ago, Orrorin tugenensis dating from 5.7 million years ago, and Ardipithecus kadabba dating to 5.6 million years ago. Each of these have been argued to be a bipedal ancestor of later hominins but, in each case, the claims have been contested. It is also possible that one or more of these species are ancestors of another branch of African apes, or that they represent a shared ancestor between hominins and other apes.

The question then of the relationship between these early fossil species and the hominin lineage is still to be resolved. From these early species, the australopithecines arose around 4 million years ago and diverged into robust (also called Paranthropus) and gracile branches, one of which (possibly A. garhi) probably went on to become ancestors of the genus Homo. The australopithecine species that is best represented in the fossil record is Australopithecus afarensis with more than 100 fossil individuals represented, found from Northern Ethiopia (such as the famous "Lucy"), to Kenya, and South Africa. Fossils of robust australopithecines such as A. robustus (or alternatively Paranthropus robustus) and A./P. boisei are particularly abundant in South Africa at sites such as Kromdraai and Swartkrans, and around Lake Turkana in Kenya.

The earliest member of the genus Homo is Homo habilis which evolved around 2.8 million years ago. H. habilis is the first species for which we have positive evidence of the use of stone tools. They developed the Oldowan lithic technology, named after the Olduvai Gorge in which the first specimens were found. Some scientists consider Homo rudolfensis, a larger bodied group of fossils with similar morphology to the original H. habilis fossils, to be a separate species, while others consider them to be part of H. habilis—simply representing intraspecies variation, or perhaps even sexual dimorphism. The brains of these early hominins were about the same size as that of a chimpanzee, and their main adaptation was bipedalism as an adaptation to terrestrial living.

During the next million years, a process of encephalization began and, by the arrival (about 1.9 million years ago) of H. erectus in the fossil record, cranial capacity had doubled. H. erectus were the first of the hominins to emigrate from Africa, and, from 1.8 to 1.3 million years ago, this species spread through Africa, Asia, and Europe. One population of H. erectus, also sometimes classified as separate species H. ergaster, remained in Africa and evolved into H. sapiens. It is believed that H. erectus and H. ergaster were the first to use fire and complex tools. In Eurasia, H. erectus evolved into species such as H. antecessor, H. heidelbergensis and H. neanderthalensis. The earliest fossils of anatomically modern humans are from the Middle Paleolithic, about 300–200,000 years ago such as the Herto and Omo remains of Ethiopia, Jebel Irhoud remains of Morocco, and Florisbad remains of South Africa; later fossils from the Skhul Cave in Israel and Southern Europe begin around 90,000 years ago (0.09 million years ago).

As modern humans spread out from Africa, they encountered other hominins such as H. neanderthalensis and the Denisovans, who may have evolved from populations of H. erectus that had left Africa around 2 million years ago. The nature of interaction between early humans and these sister species has been a long-standing source of controversy, the question being whether humans replaced these earlier species or whether they were in fact similar enough to interbreed, in which case these earlier populations may have contributed genetic material to modern humans.

This migration out of Africa is estimated to have begun about 70–50,000 years BP and modern humans subsequently spread globally, replacing earlier hominins either through competition or hybridization. They inhabited Eurasia and Oceania by 40,000 years BP, and the Americas by at least 14,500 years BP.

=== Inter-species breeding ===
A model of the evolution of the genus Homo over the last 2 million years (vertical axis). The rapid "Out of Africa" expansion of H. sapiens is indicated at the top of the diagram, with admixture indicated with Neanderthals, Denisovans, and unspecified archaic African hominins.

The hypothesis of interbreeding, also known as hybridization, admixture or hybrid-origin theory, has been discussed ever since the discovery of Neanderthal remains in the 19th century. The linear view of human evolution began to be abandoned in the 1970s as different species of humans were discovered that made the linear concept increasingly unlikely. In the 21st century with the advent of molecular biology techniques and computerization, whole-genome sequencing of Neanderthal and human genome were performed, confirming recent admixture between different human species. In 2010, evidence based on molecular biology was published, revealing unambiguous examples of interbreeding between archaic and modern humans during the Middle Paleolithic and early Upper Paleolithic. It has been demonstrated that interbreeding happened in several independent events that included Neanderthals and Denisovans, as well as several unidentified hominins. Today, approximately 2% of DNA from all non-African populations (including Europeans, Asians, and Oceanians) is Neanderthal, with traces of Denisovan heritage. Also, 4–6% of modern Melanesian genetics are Denisovan. Comparisons of the human genome to the genomes of Neanderthals, Denisovans and apes can help identify features that set modern humans apart from other hominin species. In a 2016 comparative genomics study, a Harvard Medical School/UCLA research team made a world map on the distribution and made some predictions about where Denisovan and Neanderthal genes may be impacting modern human biology.

For example, comparative studies in the mid-2010s found several traits related to neurological, immunological, developmental, and metabolic phenotypes, that were developed by archaic humans to European and Asian environments and inherited to modern humans through admixture with local hominins.

Although the narratives of human evolution are often contentious, several discoveries since 2010 show that human evolution should not be seen as a simple linear or branched progression, but a mix of related species. In fact, genomic research has shown that hybridization between substantially diverged lineages is the rule, not the exception, in human evolution. Furthermore, it is argued that hybridization was an essential creative force in the emergence of modern humans.

=== Stone tools ===
Stone tools are first attested around 2.6 million years ago, when hominins in Eastern Africa used so-called core tools, choppers made out of round cores that had been split by simple strikes. This marks the beginning of the Paleolithic, or Old Stone Age; its end is taken to be the end of the last Ice Age, around 10,000 years ago. The Paleolithic is subdivided into the Lower Paleolithic (Early Stone Age), ending around 350,000–300,000 years ago, the Middle Paleolithic (Middle Stone Age), until 50,000–30,000 years ago, and the Upper Paleolithic, (Late Stone Age), 50,000–10,000 years ago.

Archaeologists working in the Great Rift Valley in Kenya have discovered the oldest known stone tools in the world. Dated to around 3.3 million years ago, the implements are some 700,000 years older than stone tools from Ethiopia that previously held this distinction.

The period from 700,000 to 300,000 years ago is also known as the Acheulean, when H. ergaster (or erectus) made large stone hand axes out of flint and quartzite, at first quite rough (Early Acheulian), later "retouched" by additional, more-subtle strikes at the sides of the flakes. After 350,000 BP the more refined so-called Levallois technique was developed, a series of consecutive strikes, by which scrapers, slicers ("racloirs"), needles, and flattened needles were made. Finally, after about 50,000 BP, ever more refined and specialized flint tools were made by the Neanderthals and the immigrant Cro-Magnons (knives, blades, skimmers). Bone tools were also made by H. sapiens in Africa by 90,000–70,000 years ago and are also known from early H. sapiens sites in Eurasia by about 50,000 years ago.

== Species list ==
This list is in chronological order across the table by genus. Some species/subspecies names are well-established, and some are less established – especially in genus Homo. Please see articles for more information.

Sahelanthropus	Homo (humans)
S. tchadensis	H. gautengensis
Orrorin	H. habilis
O. tugenensis	H. rudolfensis
Ardipithecus	H. floresiensis
A. kadabba	H. ergaster
A. ramidus	H. erectus
Australopithecus	• H. e. georgicus
A. anamensis	H. cepranensis
A. afarensis	H. antecessor
A. bahrelghazali	H. heidelbergensis
A. africanus	H. rhodesiensis
A. garhi	H. naledi
A. sediba	H. helmei
Kenyanthropus	H. neanderthalensis
K. platyops	H. sapiens
Paranthropus	• H. s. idaltu
P. aethiopicus	• H. s. sapiens (early)
P. boisei	• H. s. sapiens (modern)
P. robustus	

== See also ==
- Adaptive evolution in the human genome
- Amity–enmity complex
- Anthropology
- Archaeogenetics
- Biological Anthropology
- Dental anthropology
- Dual inheritance theory
- Evolution of morality
- Evolutionary medicine
- Evolutionary neuroscience
- Evolutionary origin of religion
- Evolutionary psychology
- Human behavioral ecology
- Human origins
- Human vestigiality
- List of human evolution fossils
- Molecular paleontology
- Obstetrical dilemma
- Origin of language
- Origin of speech
- Prehistory of nakedness and clothing
- Sexual selection in humans
- Transgenerational trauma
- Timeline of human evolution
