= Masripithecus =

Masripithecus Temporal range: Early Miocene ~18–17 Ma

Scientific classification
- Kingdom: Animalia
- Phylum: Chordata
- Class: Mammalia
- Order: Primates
- Parvorder: Catarrhini
- Superfamily: Hominoidea
- Genus: †Masripithecus; Al-Ashqar et al., 2026
- Species: †M. moghraensis

Binomial name
- †Masripithecus moghraensis Al-Ashqar et al., 2026

Extinct genus of Early Miocene ape from Egypt

Masripithecus (Egyptian Arabic: مصري بيثيكوس) (mean: Egyptian ape) is an extinct genus of hominoid primate known from the Early Miocene Moghra Formation of Wadi Moghra in northern Egypt. It contains a single species, Masripithecus moghraensis, described in 2026 from mandibular remains dating to about 17–18 million years ago. The genus was described as the first definitive fossil ape known from North Africa, and the original study recovered it as closer to crown hominoids than coeval fossil apes from East Africa.

== Discovery and naming ==
Masripithecus moghraensis was named by Shorouq F. Al-Ashqar and colleagues in 2026 on the basis of fossil mandibular material from the Moghra Formation in the Wadi Moghra area, in the northeastern part of the Qattara Depression of northern Egypt. The fossils are dated to the late Early Miocene, about 17–18 million years ago. They were studied between 2023 and 2024.

The generic name combines Masr, the name in the Egyptian Arabic dialect for Egypt, with the Greek pithekos; the specific name refers to Wadi Moghra, the locality from which the fossils were recovered.

The holotype is MUVP 830, an anterior part of the mandible preserving the symphyseal region, the root of the left second incisor, the root and partial crown of the left canine, the root of the right canine, and the crowns of the left P3, right P3 and P4, right M2, and right M3. The paratype is MUVP 831, a left mandibular corpus preserving roots and highly abraded partial crowns of the canine and P3 to M3.

== Morphology ==
Masripithecus is known only from mandibular and dental remains. It was diagnosed by a distinctive combination of characters, including a tall and robust mandibular corpus, a relatively large canine and third lower premolar, second and third lower molars that are nearly equal in length, and relatively low-crowned, highly crenulated molars with low, rounded cusps and weak cresting between adjacent cusps.

Additional diagnostic features include metastylid cusps on the second and third molars, a lingual cingulum surrounding the metaconid of the second molar, a relatively large and bulbous second-molar hypoconulid, and the absence on the third molar of the distolingually open fovea typical of many other Early Miocene apes. The lower molars of Masripithecus were described as differing from those of contemporaneous African apes and in some respects resembling those of certain Middle Miocene Eurasian hominoids.

== Phylogeny ==
In the original paper, Masripithecus was placed within Hominoidea as incertae sedis at the family level. A combined molecular-morphological Bayesian tip-dating analysis recovered it as closer to crown hominoids than any other sampled Early Miocene ape from East Africa, with moderate support. The study interpreted this placement as filling a phylogenetic and biogeographic gap near the origin of crown Hominoidea. A simplified version of the bayesian analysis tree is shown below.

- Hominoidea
  - - †Proconsul spp.+†Ekembo spp.
  - - †Nyanzapithecinae
    - - - †Morotopithecus bishopi
        - †Afropithecus turkanensis
      - - †Equatorius africanus
        - - †Masripithecus moghraensis
          - Hylobatidae+Hominidae

Alternative analyses in the supplementary materials also placed Masripithecus in an advanced hominoid position, although its exact relationships differed depending on method. A non-clock Bayesian analysis placed it as a stem hominid within crown Hominoidea, whereas a maximum-parsimony analysis placed it as a stem hylobatid. The authors therefore regarded its broader significance as robust, while noting instability in the detailed relationships of several Early Miocene hominoid groups. A simplified version of the secondary bayesian analysis tree based on craniodental and DNA data is given below:

- Hominoidea
  - - - †Morotopithecus bishopi
      - †Afropithecus turkanensis
    - - †Ekembo spp.
  - - Cercopithecidae
    - - †Equatorius africanus
      - - †Masripithecus moghraensis
        - Hylobatidae+Hominidae

A simplified version of the standard non-clock bayesian analysis tree is given below:

- Hominoidea
  - - †Ekembo nyanzae
    - †Proconsul spp.
  - - - †Ekembo heseloni
    - - Cercopithecidae
      - - †Equatorius africanus
        - - - †Morotopithecus bishopi
            - †Afropithecus turkanensis
          - - - Hylobatidae
              - †Nyanzapithecinae
            - - †Masripithecus moghraensis
              - Hominidae

A simplified version of the strict consensus non-clock bayesian analysis tree is given below:

- Hominoidea
  - - - †Ekembo heseloni
      - - †Ekembo nyanzae
        - †Proconsul spp.
  - - †Equatorius africanus
    - - †Morotopithecus bishopi
      - - - †Afropithecus turkanensis
          - - †Rangwapithecus gordoni
            - - †Nyanzapithecus vancouveringorum
              - †Turkanapithecus kalakolensis
        - - - †Masripithecus moghraensis
            - - Hylobatidae
              - - †Oreopithecus bambolii
                - - †Nyanzapithecus alesi
                  - †Rukwapithecus fleaglei
                  - - †Nyanzapithecus harrisoni+†Nyanzapithecus pickfordi
          - Hominidae

== Palaeobiology ==
The robust jaw and the low-crowned, complex molars of Masripithecus were interpreted as consistent with a mainly frugivorous diet that also included hard objects such as nuts or seeds. The taxon has therefore been interpreted as possessing a versatile chewing apparatus relative to other Early Miocene apes.

== Palaeoenvironment ==
The fossils of Masripithecus come from the Moghra Formation, a fluviomarine succession in the Wadi Moghra area of northern Egypt. In the original study, the genus was discussed in the context of the final tectonic connection of Afro-Arabia with Eurasia during the Early Miocene, and its occurrence in northern Egypt was taken as evidence that northeastern Afro-Arabia may have played an important role in the early evolution and dispersal of crownward hominoids.
