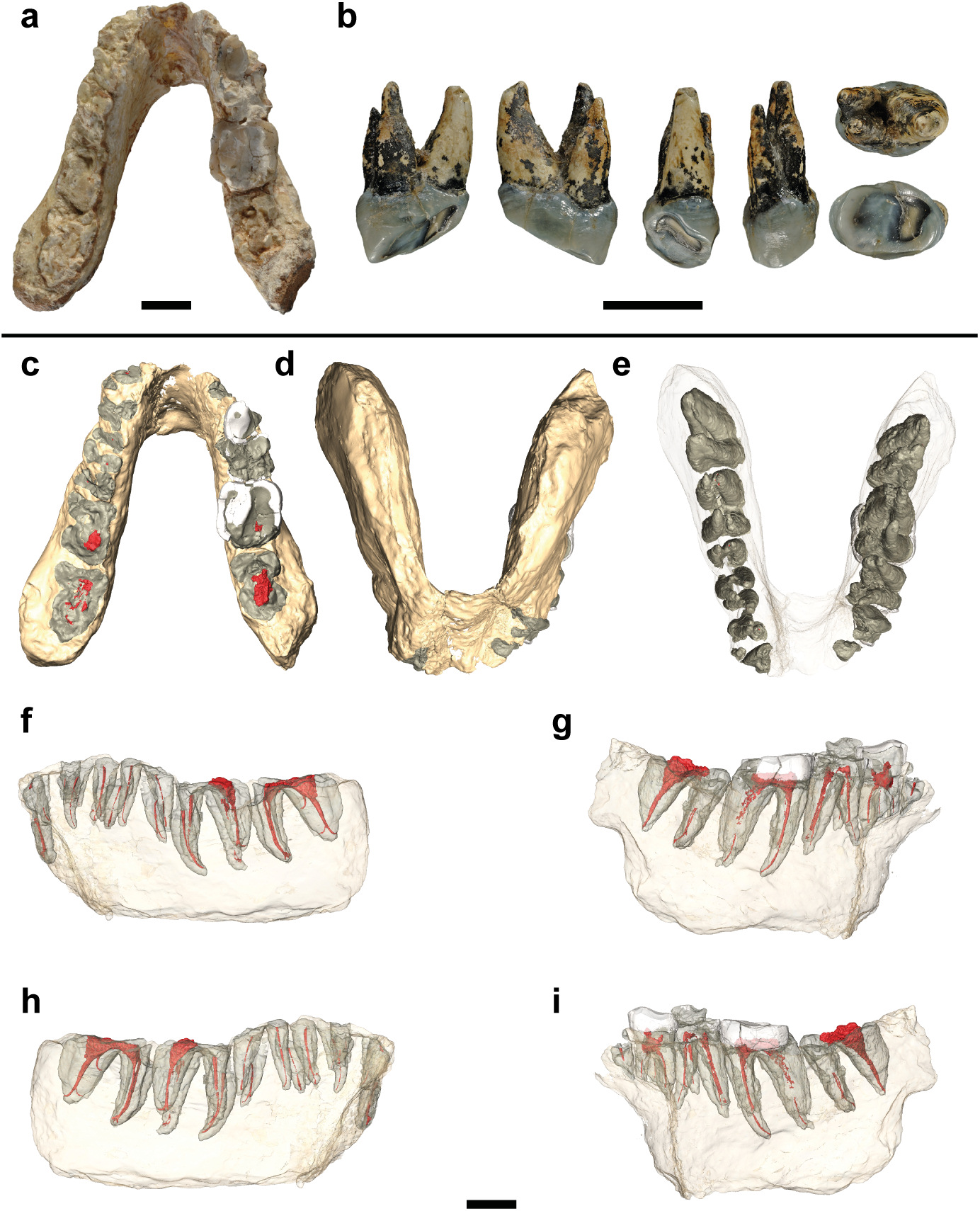
- Holotype jaw and premolar

Scientific classification
- Kingdom: Animalia
- Phylum: Chordata
- Class: Mammalia
- Order: Primates
- Superfamily: Hominoidea
- Family: Hominidae
- Tribe: †Graecopithecini
- Genus: †Graecopithecus von Koenigswald, 1972
- Species: †G. freybergi

Binomial name
- †Graecopithecus freybergi von Koenigswald, 1972

= Graecopithecus =

Graecopithecus Temporal range: 7.2 Million years ago

Extinct genus of hominids

Graecopithecus is an extinct genus of hominid that lived in southeast Europe during the late Miocene around 7.2 million years ago. Originally identified by a single lower jawbone bearing teeth found in Pyrgos Vasilissis, Athens, Greece, in 1944, other teeth potentially belonging to this taxon were discovered from Azmaka quarry in Bulgaria in 2012. With only little and badly preserved materials to reveal its nature, it is considered as "the most poorly known European Miocene hominoids." The creature was popularly nicknamed 'El Graeco' (word play on the Greek-Spanish painter El Greco) by scientists.

In 2017, palaeontologists led by Madelaine Böhme of the Eberhard-Karls-University Tübingen, Germany, published a controversial analysis of the teeth and age of the specimens, and came to the conclusion that it could be the oldest hominin, meaning that it could be the oldest direct ancestors of humans after splitting from that of the chimpanzees. Their simultaneous study also claimed that contrary to the generally accepted evidence of the African origin of the hominin lineage, the ancestors of humans originated from the main ape ancestry in the Mediterranean region (before migrating into Africa where they evolved into the ancestors of Homo species). They named the origin of human theory as the "North Side Story."

These claims have been dismissed by most other scientists. Rick Potts and Bernard Wood argued that the evidence is too flimsy to even say it is a hominin. Tim D. White suggested that the analysis was an attempt to resurrect a "tired argument" for the European origins of human beings, while Sergio Almécija stated that single characters such as teeth could not support sweeping evolutionary claims.

== Discovery ==
The original Graecopithecus specimen was a single lower jawbone (mandible) found from a site called Pyrgos Vassilissis, northwest of Athens, in southern Greece in 1944, "reportedly unearthed as the occupying German forces were building a wartime bunker". The jawbone was almost complete with teeth when it was sent to Berlin for analysis, but was damaged by bombings during the final phases of World War II. Only the second molar and fourth premolar remain intact, while fragments of other teeth are still embedded. The original finder, German paleontologist Bruno von Freyberg initially believed that it belonged to an extinct Old World monkey Mesopithecus, as he reported in 1951. However, Gustav Heinrich Ralph von Koenigswald realised that it was the tooth of an ape family and erected the scientific name Graecopithecus freybergi in 1972, after the discoverer.

Another tooth (an upper fourth premolar) possibly belonging to Graecopithecus was discovered at Azmaka quarry in Bulgaria in 2012, originally assigned to cf. Ouranopithecus sp. or aff. G. freybergi. In 2017, Jochen Fuss and colleagues attributed the Azmaka premolar to cf. Graecopithecus sp.

Hominin timeline
| ← / Earlier apes; ← / Gorilla split; ← / Chimpanzee split; ← / Earliest bipedal; ← / Earliest sign of Ardipithecus; ← / Earliest sign of Australopithecus; ← / Earliest stone tools; ← / Earliest sign of Homo; ← / Dispersal beyond Africa; ← / Earliest fire / cooking; ← / Earliest rock art; ← / Earliest clothes; ← / Modern humans |
(million years ago)

== Description ==
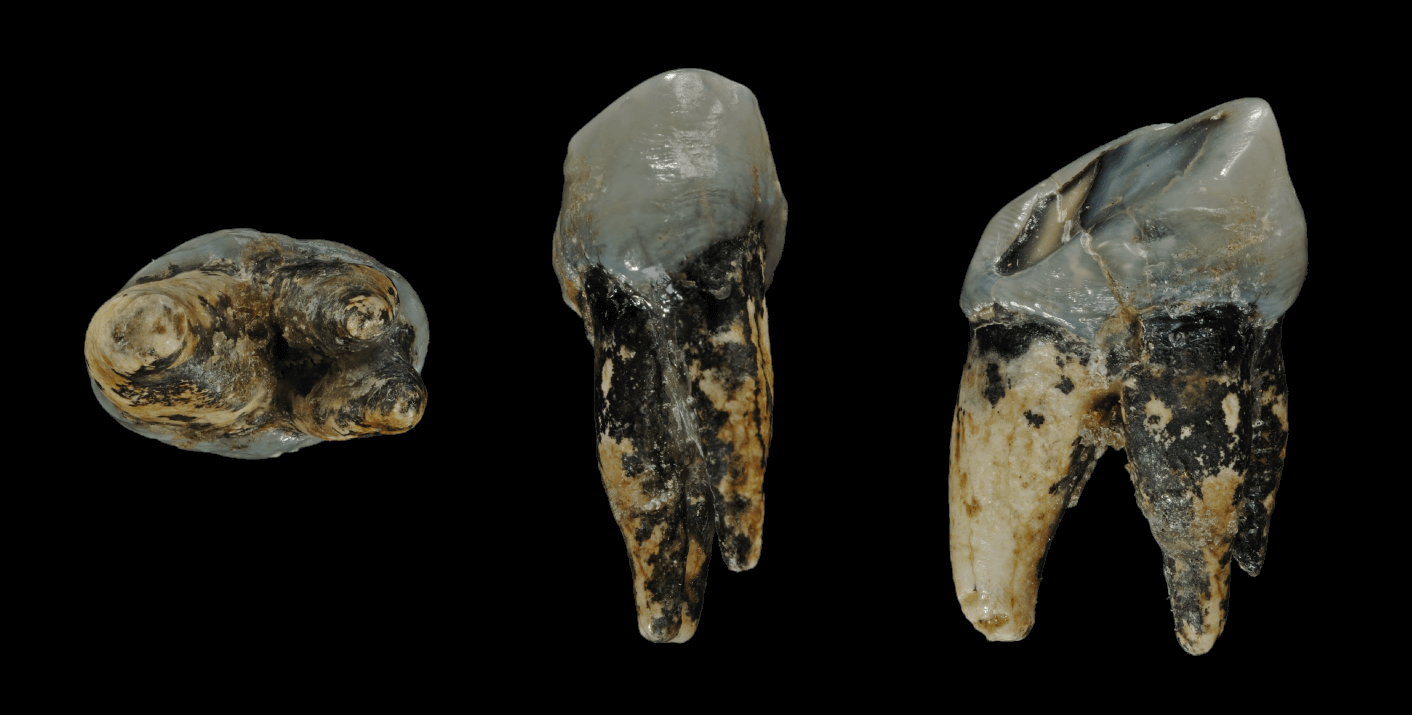
An upper fourth premolar of cf. Graecopithecus sp. from Azmaka, Bulgaria

The mandible of Graecopithecus with a third molar that is very worn, the root of a second molar, and a fragment of a premolar, is dated from the late Miocene around 7.2 million years old. Excavation of the site is not possible (as of 1986) due to the owner having built a swimming pool on the location. The thick enamel and large molars are the features that convinced von Koenigswald that the specimen belonged to a hominid species. X-ray microtomography and 3-dimensional reconstruction in 2017 revealed that it belonged to an adult individual and possibly a male. The partial fusion of the fourth premolar (P4) roots is an additional evidence that it is of a hominid, and the thick enamel resembles those of the human lineage (hominins).

A nearly complete femur, Azmaka femur, dating to the Messinian age around 7.2 million years ago has been tentatively assigned to cf. Graecopithecus. This femur could be a possible candidate for the ancestral form of bipedal behaviour that evolved in hominins later on predating the bipedalism seen in Orrorin and Sahelanthropus. This femur lacks many features seen in quadrupeds while having many traits that would indicate a complex locomotive lifestyle.

== Classification ==
G. freybergi is considered to be possibly the same taxon as Ouranopithecus macedoniensis, another extinct hominid described in 1977 from northern Greece. Due to paucity of specimens and poor quality of the fossils, it remains the least well-known extinct hominid found within Europe. In 1984, British palaeontologists Peter Andrews and Lawrence B. Martin classified Graecopithecus and Ouranopithecus as synonyms (same taxon) and treated them as members of the genus Sivapithecus. This classification persisted for several years until additional Ouranopithecus fossils were discovered including part of the skull in the 1990s that indicated better distinction as different hominids. Based on new evidences, in 1997, Australian palaeontologist David W. Cameron proposed renaming and inclusion of Ouranopithecus into Graecopithecus based on taxonomic priority with Graecopithecus macedoniensis as a new name for O. macedoniensis. However, better O. macedoniensis specimens were found including a new species Ouranopithecus turkae from Turkey that supported separation of the genus. This change was generally adopted.

=== Re-examination and reinterpretation ===
In 2017, an international team of palaeontologists led by Madelaine Böhme (Eberhard-Karls-University Tübingen, Germany) published detailed reanalysis and new interpretation in the journal PLOS One. One paper deals with an examination of the detailed morphology of molar teeth of G. freybergi from Greece and Bulgaria, and compared it with that of Ouranopithecus. The study concluded that Graecopithecus was a hominin, sharing ancestry with Homo but not with the chimpanzees (Pan), and distinct from Ouranopithecus, which has more ape-like traits. If this classification is correct, Graecopithecus would be the oldest known representative of the human lineage after the human–chimpanzee split, in 19th-century terminology, the "missing link" between human and non-human primates. The species was found to be some two hundred thousand years older than the oldest known hominid found in Africa (not necessarily ancestral to the human lineage), Sahelanthropus tchadensis. The study concludes:

[The] dental root attributes of Graecopithecus suggest hominin affinities, such that its hominin status cannot be excluded. If this status is confirmed by additional fossil evidence, Graecopithecus would be the oldest known hominin and the oldest-known crown hominine, as the evidence for the gorillin status of Chororapithecus is much weaker than the hominin status of Graecopithecus. More fossils are needed but at this point it seems likely that the Eastern Mediterranean needs to be considered as just as likely a place of hominine diversification and hominin origins as tropical Africa.

An accompanying paper presents the study of the geological environments of the areas where the fossils were discovered. Until then, the precise date of Graecopithecus has not been resolved and usually inferred from geological data of materials related the fossils and surrounding areas that add to uncertainty in its evolutionary importance and relationship with other hominids. It is often broadly described as 6.6 to 8 million years old. The PLOS One paper resolved that the hominid lived 7.37 to 7.11 million years ago, with the specimen from Greece dated to 7.18 Ma and that from Bulgaria to 7.24 Ma. It also indicates that as the species lived in Europe, it suggest "that major splits in the hominid family occurred outside Africa."

It has also been proposed the Graecopithecus may not be a direct ancestor of the human lineage, but instead may have evolved its hominin-like traits independently. The emergence of Homo itself is dated to close to 4 million years later than Graecopithecus, so that the appearance of Graecopithecus in Europe does not preclude the development of Homo proper in East Africa (as suggested by Homo habilis being found in Tanzania); however, the popular press reporting on the 2017 study did cast its result in terms of determining the "birthplace of mankind". Graecopithecus lived in southeast Europe 7.2 million years ago, and if the premise of the study is correct, Graecopithecus, after evolving in Europe, would have migrated to Africa about 7 million years ago where its descendants would eventually evolve into the genus Homo.

==== Criticism ====
The 2017 PLOS One papers made two critical conclusions: that Graecopithecus is a hominin suggesting it as the oldest ancestor of humans after splitting from chimpanzees, and that as Graecopithecus is a human ancestor, Europe is the birthplace of hominins. This directly challenges the prevailing knowledge that humans originated in East Africa.

David R. Begun of the University of Toronto, Canada, one of the co-authors, was quoted as saying that "[t]his dating allows us to move the human–chimpanzee split into the Mediterranean area." This was set against a quote by an uninvolved anthropologist saying that "[i]t is possible that the human lineage originated in Europe, but very substantial fossil evidence places the origin in Africa [...] I would be hesitant about using a single character from an isolated fossil to set against the evidence from Africa." Since 1994, Begun had adhered to a hypothesis that African hominids (including living apes) descended from Eurasian apes since the older ape fossils are found in Europa and Asia. This is a feasible explanation as it is possible that the African ape ancestors could move to Africa around 9 million years ago from Europe.

However, many researchers have challenged the claim that Graecopithecus is evidence of the human lineage originating in Europe, since virtually all human ancestral species that have been discovered so far have been found in Africa. The European hypothesis remains in contradiction with the consensus view.

As Rick Potts, head of the Smithsonian's Human Origins Program, remarked: "I think the principal claim of the main paper goes well beyond the evidence in hand... A hominin or even a hominine (modern African ape) ancestor located in a fairly isolated place in southern Europe doesn't make much sense geographically as the ancestor of modern African apes, or particular the oldest ancestor of African hominins." David Alba at the Catalan Institute of Palaeontology in Barcelona was the first to point out that "It is not surprising at all that Begun is now arguing that hominins as well originated in Europe." Julien Benoit of the University of the Witwatersrand, Johannesburg, South Africa, also commented: "Any study that counters this consensus (Out of Africa theory) would have to provide very strong evidence and perfect methodology to support its claim. In my opinion, this article doesn't meet those criteria."

Other scientists have also expressed skepticism of Begun's classification. Bernard Wood of George Washington University described the hypothesis as "relatively weak" and Sergio Almécija, also at George Washington University, reminded the press that primates have a special tendency towards "evolving similar features independently". "Single characters are not reliable to make big evolutionary [claims]". Tim White at the University of California, Berkeley, dismissed the study as merely an attempt "to resurrect Begun's tired argument with a long-known crappy fossil, newly scanned."

The attribution of the Azmaka upper premolar to cf. Graecopithecus sp. has also drawn criticism, particularly as the Graecopithecus holotype mandible preserves only lower dentition, limiting direct comparisons. In their 2023 review of Miocene ape systematics and evolution, Alessandro Urciuoli and David M. Alba referred the Azmaka tooth more cautiously to Graecopithecini indet., a position recently endorsed by P. Radović and colleagues.

==== Reassessment ====
In late 2017, Julien Benoit and Francis J. Thackeray re-analysed the claims of the PLOS One papers and found key issues in the major conclusions:

1. The partial fusion of the fourth premolar (P4) roots does not define Graecopithecus as a hominin since the feature is common in hominids, even in the chimpanzees.
2. Thick enamel and relatively large molar teeth are not exclusive to hominins as they are also present in other Miocene apes and gorillas.
3. The claim that Graecopithecus is the ancestral ape of human lineage and that humans originate in Europe is not justified. Even if Graecopithecus is the basal (root ancestor) ape, all other human ancestral species starting from Sahelanthropus were in Africa, thus, still making Africa the birthplace of humans.

The study concludes:

[We] recognise a small signal for placing Graecopithecus at the root of the Hominini clade. This means that the phylogenetic relationship between Graecopithecus and Hominini is as yet not confirmed. Our analysis supports the view that Graecopithecus is potentially an important taxon for the origin of Hominini, but this is not certain and deserves further investigation and more material.

==== Response ====
In 2018, Fuss, Spassov, Böhme, and Begun published a response to Benoit and Thackeray, claiming that their original publication had been misrepresented and misconstrued. They explained that the conclusion of the 2017 paper had not been that Graecopithecus was certainly a hominin, but that its status as a hominin could not be ruled out, and that more research and evidence would be needed to make a conclusion—a conclusion that Benoit and Thackeray make in their own paper. They argued against Benoit and Thackeray write that they did not judge canine root derivation of Graecopithecus and Salehanthropus against each other, stating that the differences between them were within the range of sexual variation. Additionally, when Benoit and Thackeray claim that the characteristics mentioned in the 2017 paper are not unique to Hominini, they do not mention that the 2017 paper discusses canine root size and premolar root complexity reduction, which could be indications of Hominini.

== See also ==
- Griphopithecus – Extinct genus of primates
- Anoiapithecus – Extinct genus of ape from the Miocene
- Chororapithecus – Extinct hominine genus from the Miocene
- Dryopithecus – Extinct great ape from Europe
- Nakalipithecus – Extinct species of ape
- Pierolapithecus – Extinct species of ape from Miocene Europe
- Samburupithecus – Extinct genus of primate from Miocene Kenya
