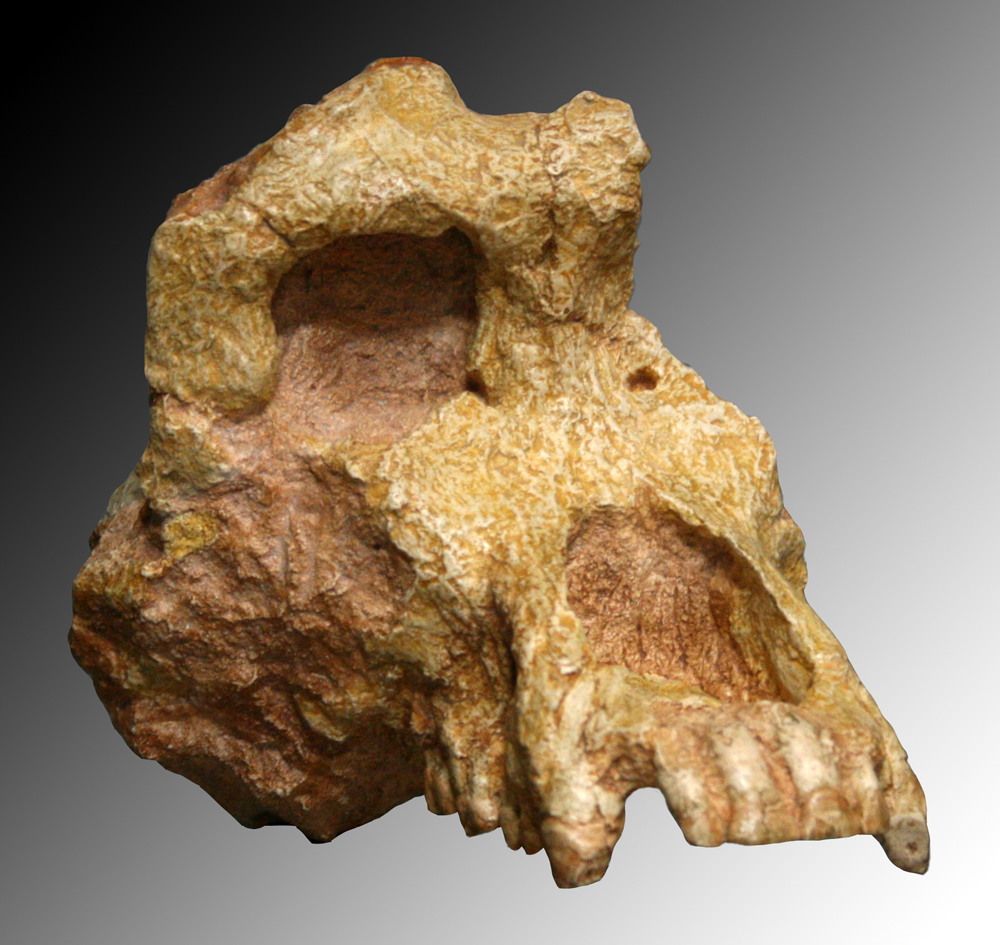
- Ouranopithecus macedoniensis skull in the French National Museum of Natural History, Paris

Scientific classification
- Kingdom: Animalia
- Phylum: Chordata
- Class: Mammalia
- Order: Primates
- Superfamily: Hominoidea
- Family: Hominidae
- Tribe: †Graecopithecini
- Genus: †Ouranopithecus; Bonis & Melentis, 1977

Species
- †Ouranopithecus macedoniensis; †Ouranopithecus turkae

= Ouranopithecus =

Ouranopithecus Temporal range: Miocene, 9.6–7.4 Ma

Genus of extinct Eurasian great ape from the Miocene

Ouranopithecus is a genus of extinct Eurasian great ape represented by two species, Ouranopithecus macedoniensis, a late Miocene (9.6–8.7 mya) hominoid from Greece and Ouranopithecus turkae, also from the late Miocene (8.7–7.4 mya) of Turkey.

The first specimen of O. macedoniensis was discovered by the French palaeontologists Louis de Bonis and Jean Melentis in 1977,; the first of O. turkae was found by a Turkish team led by Erksin Savaş Güleç in 2007. For a long time, it was considered as similar (synonymous) to Graecopithecus and a member of the genus Sivapithecus, which is something today contested.

== Description and systematics ==
Based on O. macedoniensis' dental and facial anatomy, it has been suggested that Ouranopithecus was actually a dryopithecine. However, it is probably more closely related to the Ponginae. Some researchers consider O. macedoniensis to be the last common ancestor of humans (hominins) and the other apes, and a forerunner to australopithecines and humans, although this is very controversial and not widely accepted. It is true that O. macedoniensis shares derived features with some early hominins (such as the frontal sinus, a cavity in the forehead), but they are almost certainly not closely related species.

In 1984, British palaeontologists Peter Andrews and Lawrence B. Martin classified Graecopithecus and Ouranopithecus as synonyms (same taxon) and treated them as members of the genus Sivapithecus. However, comparative analysis showed that there is not enough data to support the synonymy.

When more O. macedoniensis fossils were discovered, including part of the skull in the 1990s, it became apparent that O. macedoniensis and G. freybergi are distinct species. In the light of new data, in 1997, Australian palaeontologist David W. Cameron treated Graecopithecus as a valid genus based on taxonomic priority and renamed O. macedoniensis as Graecopithecus macedoniensis. However, better O. macedoniensis specimens were found including a new species Ouranopithecus turkae from Turkey that warranted separation of the genus. Furthermore, a controversial paper in 2017 claimed that Graecopithecus is more closely related to hominins than to other great apes, which if true would clearly distinguish it from Ouranopithecus specimens. Separate genus for the two therefore continue to be generally adopted.

== See also ==
- Anoiapithecus – Extinct genus of ape from the Miocene
- Chororapithecus – Extinct hominine genus from the Miocene
- Dryopithecus – Extinct great ape from Europe
- Nakalipithecus – Extinct species of ape
- Pierolapithecus – Extinct species of ape from Miocene Europe
- Samburupithecus – Extinct genus of primate from Miocene Kenya
