= Salvador Moya =

Salvador Moya may refer to:

- Salvador Moyà-Solà (born 1955), Spanish paleontologist
- Salvi Moya (born 1996), Spanish footballer
