= Queen's Tower =

Queen's Tower can refer to:

- Queen's Tower, Brisbane, residential skyscraper in Brisbane, Australia
- Queen's Tower (London), a building of Imperial College London
- Queen's Tower (Serpieri), a former royal estate near Athens
- Queen's Tower (Sheffield), a house in Norfolk Park
- Queen's Tower (Neduntheevu), a tower and lighthouse in Neduntheevu
