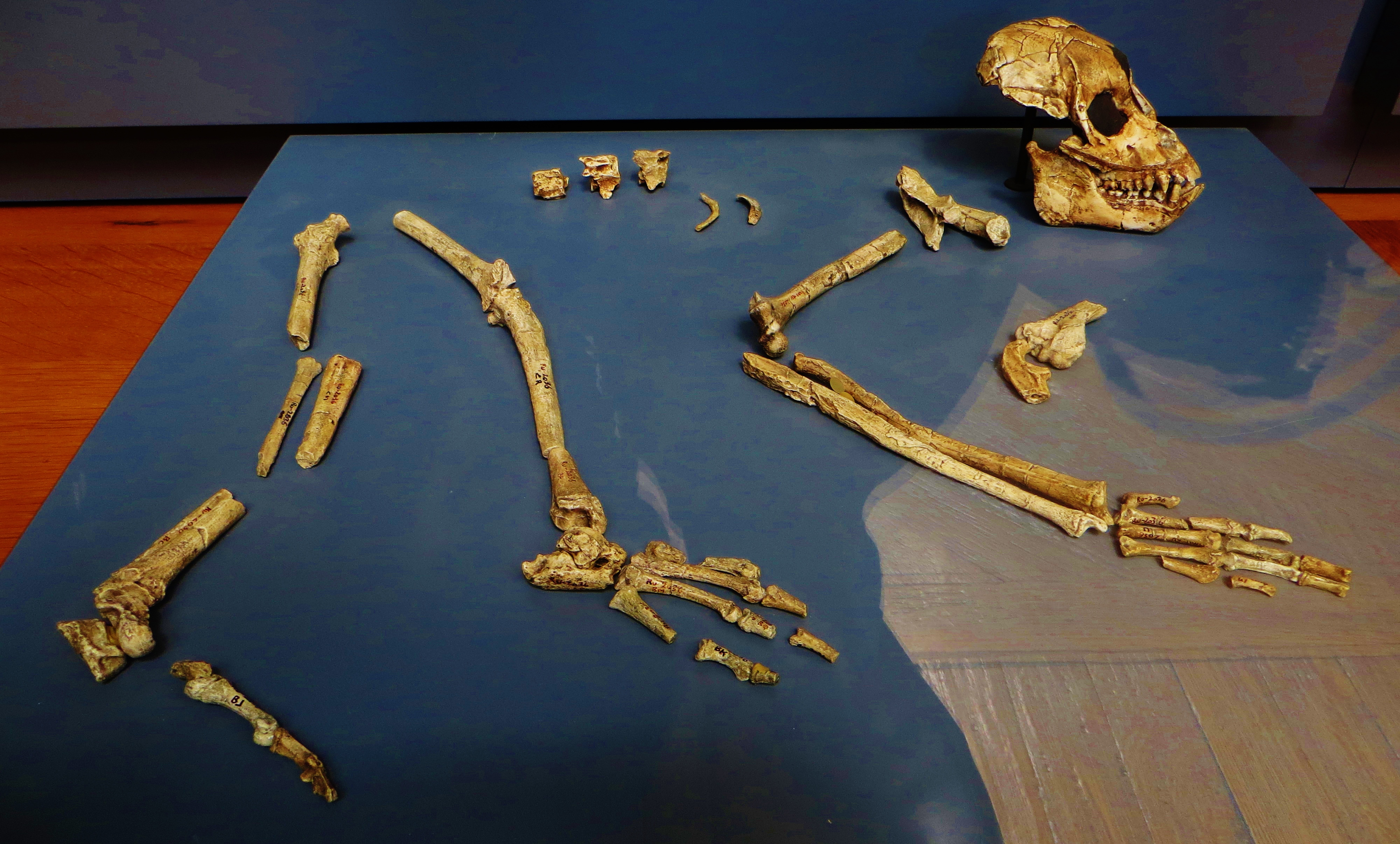

Scientific classification
- Kingdom: Animalia
- Phylum: Chordata
- Class: Mammalia
- Infraclass: Placentalia
- Order: Primates
- Superfamily: Hominoidea
- Genus: †Ekembo
- Species: †E. nyanzae

Binomial name
- †Ekembo nyanzae Le Gros Clark & Leakey, 1950

= Ekembo nyanzae =

Ekembo nyanzae Temporal range: Miocene, 13.65–11.608 Ma

Extinct species of mammal

Ekembo nyanzae, originally classed as a species of Proconsul, is a species of fossil primate first discovered by Louis Leakey on Rusinga Island in 1942, which he published in Nature in 1943. It is also known by the name Dryopithecus africanus. A joint publication of Wilfrid Le Gros Clark and Louis Leakey in 1951, "The Miocene Hominoidea of East Africa", first defines Proconsul nyanzae. In 1965 Simons and Pilbeam replaced Proconsul with Dryopithecus, using the same species names.

In 1967, Louis defined Kenyapithecus africanus on seven fossils from Rusinga Island. He saw it as an ancestor of wickeri and also of man, with a date of 20 mya in the middle Miocene. Another fossil found by the VanCouverings on Rusinga in 1967 seemed to confirm africanus. In 1969 Simons and Pilbeam moved Kenyapithecus africanus into Dryopithecus nyanzae. By 1978 the genus had recovered from the Dryopithecine event and was back to Proconsul. In that year Andrews moved Clark & Leakey's 1951 Sivapithecus africanus into Proconsul nyanzae. In 2015, it was moved into the new genus Ekembo.

A more recent discovery by Ward et al. in 1999 and reclassification splits Kenyapithecus africanus away again and lumps it with Equatorius africanus, which would move it to the subfamily Afropithecinae with Afropithecus turkanensis. As Ekembo, Kenyapithecus may not be in the same clade as apes and humans, but as the older Equatorius, it may be.

== Morphology ==
Ekembo nyanzae had a dental formula of 2:1:2:3 on both the upper and lower jaw. The upper premolars of E. nyanzae were large. This species had a relatively thick enamel on the molars. The mandible of this species was relatively robust. E. nyanzae had an average body mass of about 30 kilograms (66 lb).

== Range ==
E. nyanzae lived on the continent of Africa and the fossils were found in areas that suggest it lived in a dry, open woodland environment.

== See also ==
- Chororapithecus
- Dryopithecus
- Nakalipithecus
- Pierolapithecus
- Samburupithecus
