= K. africanus =

K. africanus may refer to:

- Kenyapithecus africanus, a synonym for Proconsul nyanzae, an extinct primate species
- Kluyveromyces africanus, a fungus species in the genus Kluyveromyces

== See also ==
- Africanus (disambiguation)
