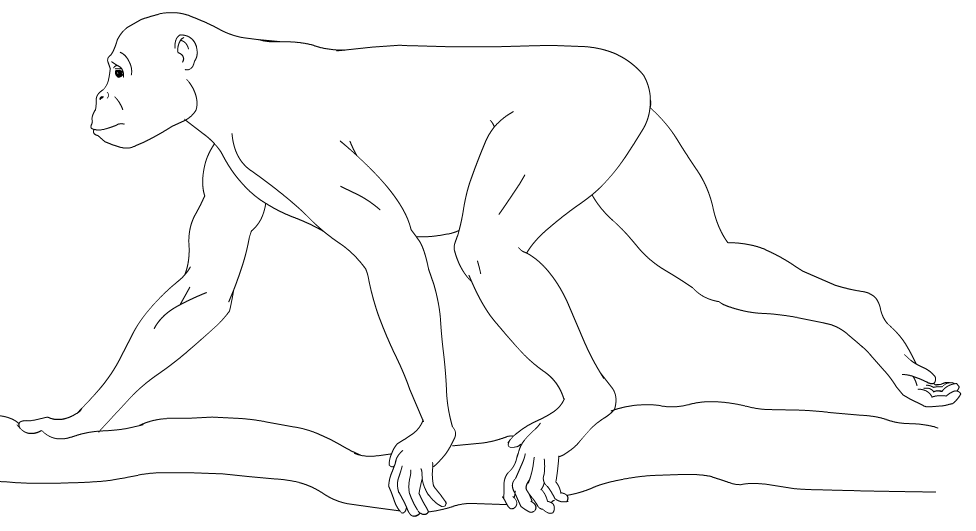

Scientific classification
- Kingdom: Animalia
- Phylum: Chordata
- Class: Mammalia
- Order: Primates
- Family: †Proconsulidae
- Genus: †Proconsul
- Species: †P. major

Binomial name
- †Proconsul major Le Gros Clark & Leakey, 1950

Synonyms
- Ugandapithecus major Le Gros Clark & Leakey, 1950

= Proconsul major =

Proconsul major Temporal range: 20 Million years ago

Extinct species of primate

Proconsul major, an extinct primate of the genus Proconsul, was possibly the ancestor of Afropithecus and showed hominid characteristics. It occurred during the early Miocene and was roughly, the size of a gorilla. The species previously referred to as Ugandapithecus major is now considered to be a synonym of Proconsul major. Prior to 2000, it was known as Proconsul major and some argue against the renaming.

Proconsul major lived on the continent of Africa in the region around Moroto, Uganda. Based upon dental morphology, Proconsul major was a frugivorous species.

== Morphology ==
Proconsul major had a typical primate dental formula of 2.1.2.32.1.2.3. The canines are sexually dimorphic. The inferior transverse torus is absent and the superior transverse torus is well-developed in Proconsul major. This species had an average body mass of around 50 kg (110 lb).

== Fossil finds ==
A nearly complete fossilized P. major skull estimated to be 20 million years old was found at the Napak XV site near Iriri on the slope of the extinct Napak Volcano in July 2011 by a team led by Martin Pickford and Brigitte Senut. After a year of cleaning, documentation and reconstruction in Paris, the skull fragments are now on display in the Uganda Museum in Kampala.

Previously, only smaller pieces of younger fossils had been found at Napak and at the Moroto I site near Loitakero.
