= Salvador Moyà-Solà =

Spanish paleontologist (born in 1955)

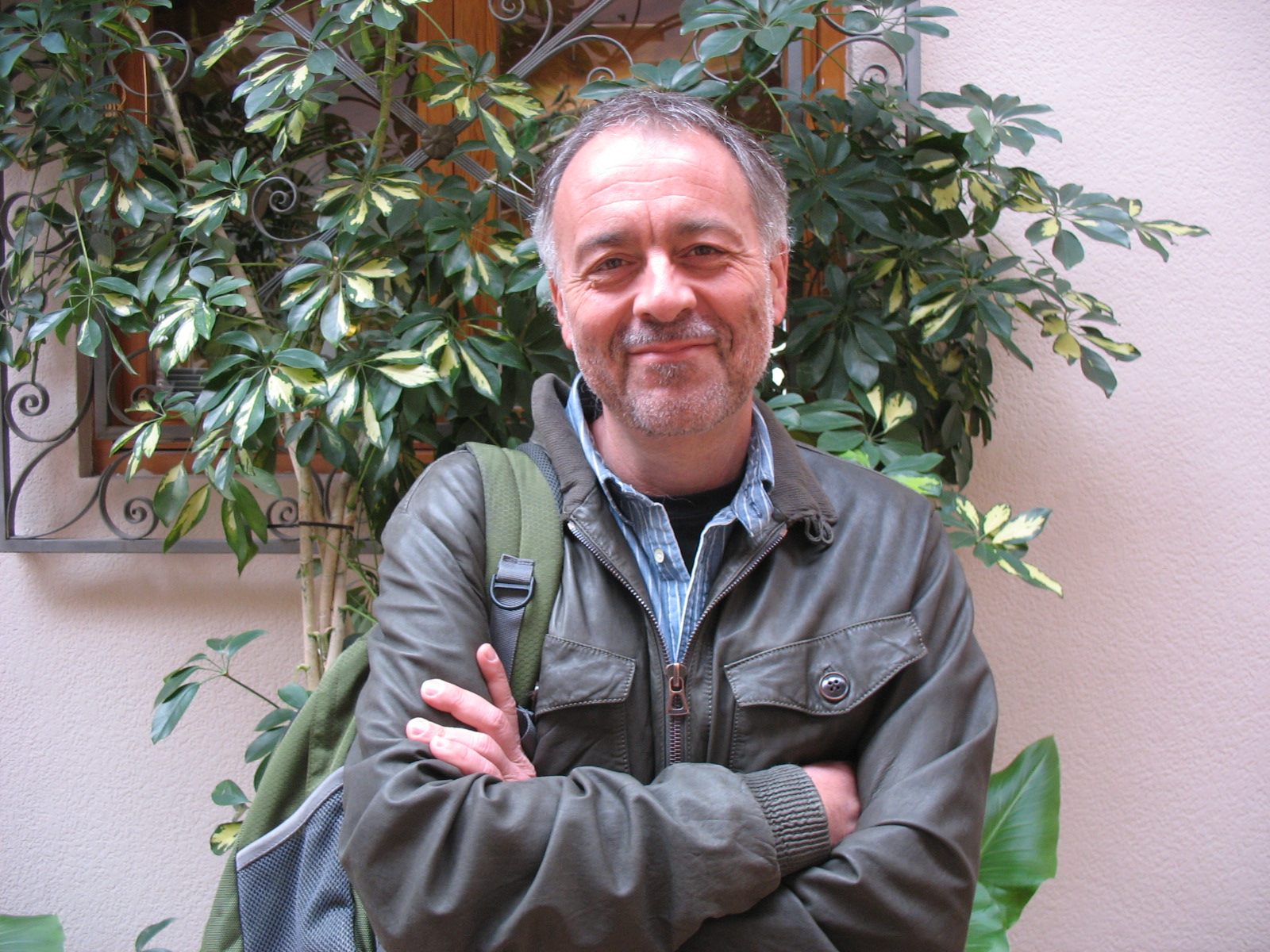
- Moyà-Solà in 2012
- Born: 1955 (age 70–71); Palma, Mallorca, Spain
- Education: University of Barcelona; Autonomous University of Barcelona (Ph.D.)
- Scientific career
- Fields: Vertebrate paleontology, paleoanthropology, paleoprimatology

Salvador Moyà-Solà (born 1955) is a Spanish vertebrate paleontologist and paleoanthropologist whose research has focused on Miocene primates and the evolution of insular mammals. He was the founder and first director of the Institut Català de Paleontologia Miquel Crusafont (ICP), serving from 2006 to 2017. His research has included work on Hispanopithecus laietanus, Pierolapithecus catalaunicus, Anoiapithecus brevirostris and Pliobates cataloniae.

== Early life and education ==
Moyà-Solà was born in Palma, Mallorca, in 1955. In 1975, he moved to Barcelona to study geology at the Autonomous University of Barcelona (UAB). He moved to the University of Barcelona in 1977 and graduated in 1979, completing his undergraduate thesis under the supervision of paleontologist Miquel Crusafont. He later returned to UAB, where he completed a Ph.D. on fossil bovids in 1983.

== Career ==
Moyà-Solà was a researcher at the Institut de Paleontologia M. Crusafont from 1985 to 2005. In 2006, he became an ICREA research professor at the Autonomous University of Barcelona. He was commissioned to design a new research center devoted to vertebrate and human paleontology, which became the Institut Català de Paleontologia later that year. Moyà-Solà served as the institute's founding director until 2017.

In 2011, Moyà-Solà received the Fabio Frassetto Award from the Accademia Nazionale dei Lincei.

Moyà-Solà retired on 21 September 2025 and continued at the ICP as an emeritus researcher.

In 2026, the fossil amphicyonid Paludocyon moyasolai was named in his honor.

== Research ==
Moyà-Solà's early research focused on fossil mammals and the evolution of insular faunas, particularly those of the Balearic Islands. From the late 1980s, he increasingly specialized in paleoprimatology and the evolution of Miocene apes.

During excavations at Can Llobateres in the early 1990s, Moyà-Solà and colleagues recovered a partial skeleton of Hispanopithecus laietanus, nicknamed "Jordi". Moyà-Solà and Meike Köhler published a study of its postcranial anatomy in Nature in 1996, focusing on its implications for the origins of great-ape locomotion.

In 2004, Moyà-Solà led the description of Pierolapithecus catalaunicus, based on a partial skeleton recovered from Barranc de Can Vila 1 near Els Hostalets de Pierola. The specimen was nicknamed "Pau".

In 2009, Moyà-Solà described Anoiapithecus brevirostris, another Miocene hominoid from Catalonia. He later coauthored the 2015 description of Pliobates cataloniae. Pliobates was initially interpreted as a stem hominoid, but a 2024 study coauthored by Moyà-Solà reassigned it to the pliopithecoids.

In 2009, he and Köhler published research on bone histology and life-history adaptations in the extinct Balearic bovid Myotragus.
