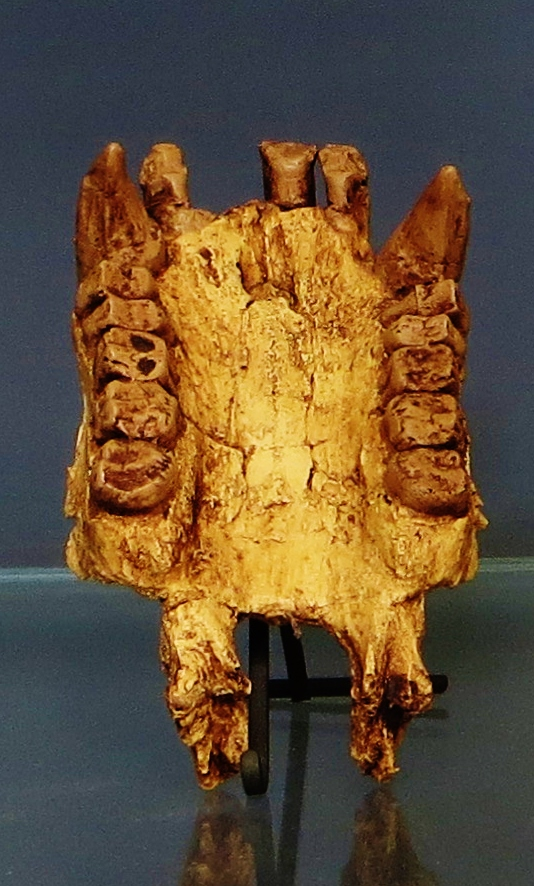
- Jaw

Scientific classification
- Kingdom: Animalia
- Phylum: Chordata
- Class: Mammalia
- Order: Primates
- Suborder: Haplorhini
- Infraorder: Simiiformes
- Family: †Proconsulidae
- Genus: †Morotopithecus; Gebo et al., 1997
- Species: †M. bishopi

Binomial name
- †Morotopithecus bishopi Gebo et al., 1997

= Morotopithecus =

Morotopithecus Temporal range: Miocene, 20.6 Ma

Species of extinct ape from Miocene central Africa

Morotopithecus is a genus of fossil ape discovered in Miocene-age deposits of Moroto, Uganda.

The phylogenetic status of Morotopithecus bishopi is debated to the extent that it challenges established views on the connection between Miocene primates and extant hominids (i.e. great apes). Parsimonious phylogenetic analyses indicate Morotopithecus is more derived than Proconsul, Afropithecus, and Kenyapithecus, but less derived than Oreopithecus, Sivapithecus, and Dryopithecus. Under this arrangement, Morotopithecus would be a sister taxon to extant great apes while Hylobates (gibbons) seem to have branched off before this clade appeared. However, gibbons are believed to have branched off 18 million years ago while Morotopithecus is dated to more than 20.6 million years.

In a comparison of teeth characteristics of Morotopithecus to Afropithecus the results showed little difference, plus evidence gathered from cranial comparisons also indicate that the two genera may be the same, a conclusion of limited confidence due to the lack of evidence to produce a complete anatomy for both (Patel, Grossman 2005). Meanwhile, Pickford (2002) referred the vertebrae to Ugandapithecus, and considered Morotopithecus synonymous with Afropithecus.

It appears to have lived in wooded grassland, and had a diet dominated by leaves.
