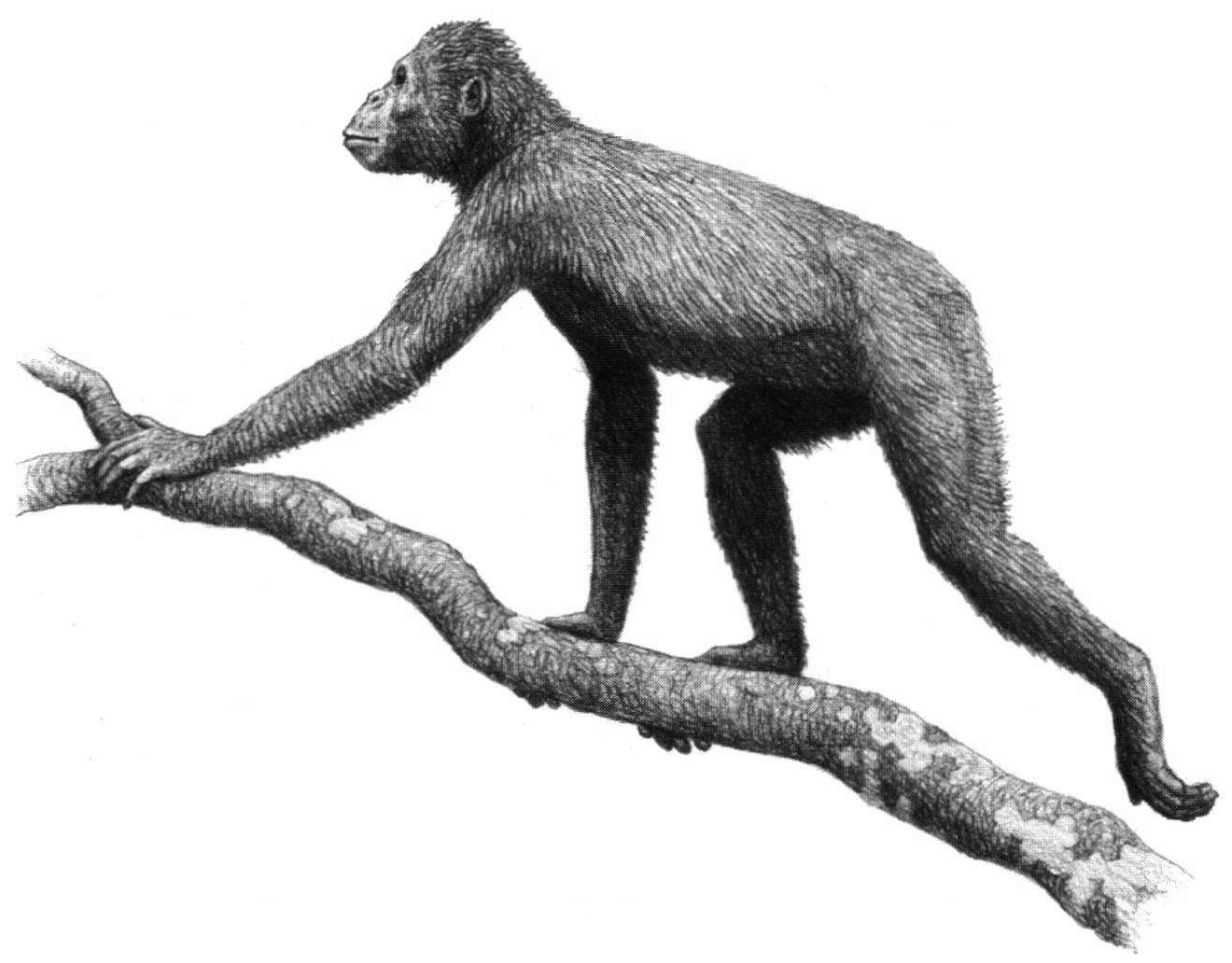

Scientific classification
- Kingdom: Animalia
- Phylum: Chordata
- Class: Mammalia
- Infraclass: Placentalia
- Order: Primates
- Superfamily: Hominoidea
- Family: †Proconsulidae
- Genus: †Proconsul
- Species: †P. africanus

Binomial name
- †Proconsul africanus Hopwood, 1933b

= Proconsul africanus =

Proconsul africanus Temporal range: 23–14 Ma Miocene

Extinct species of mammal

Proconsul africanus was an ape which lived from about 23 to 14 million years ago during the Miocene epoch. It was a fruit eater and its brain was larger than that of a monkey, although probably not as large as that of a modern ape.

It was named by paleontologist Arthur Hopwood in 1933 after a number of chimpanzees which were all called Consul. The chimpanzees performed human-like circus acts, such as riding a bicycle and playing the piano, in the late nineteenth and early twentieth centuries. Other species of the genus Proconsul have since been discovered.

== Discovery ==
The Leakey expedition of 1947–1948 to Rusinga Island in Lake Victoria uncovered more species of Proconsul. Mary Leakey made an especially complete find of Proconsul there in 1948, which was for a number of decades labeled africanus, but was reclassified as heseloni in 1993 by Alan Walker. In 1951 Leakey and Le Gros Clark placed Hopwood's Xenopithecus koruensis ("strange ape from Koru, Kenya") with africanus. In 1951 also T. Whitworth found more Proconsul on Rusinga, which he considered africanus, but they were lumped with 1992 finds by Walker to form heseloni.

The 18-million-year-old fossil species has been considered a possible ancestor of both great and lesser apes, and of humans. The paleontologist Louis Leakey, who was one of the foremost fossil-hunters of the 20th century and a champion of evolution, said:

An especially important creature was Proconsul africanus. This, many authorities once concluded, gave us an indication of the common stock for apes and men. We have good forelimb bones for it, and in 1948 on Rusinga Island Mary [Leakey] discovered a skull, the first nearly complete specimen ever found. Its canine teeth suggest an ape's, while its forehead reminds us of our own. It seems to me, however, to be neither an ancestral ape, nor yet an ancestor of man, but a side branch with characteristics of both stocks..."

Leakey changed his mind a few times about the exact classification of Proconsul, as did most other paleontologists. Opinion currently favors a position between the monkeys and the apes.

== Morphology ==
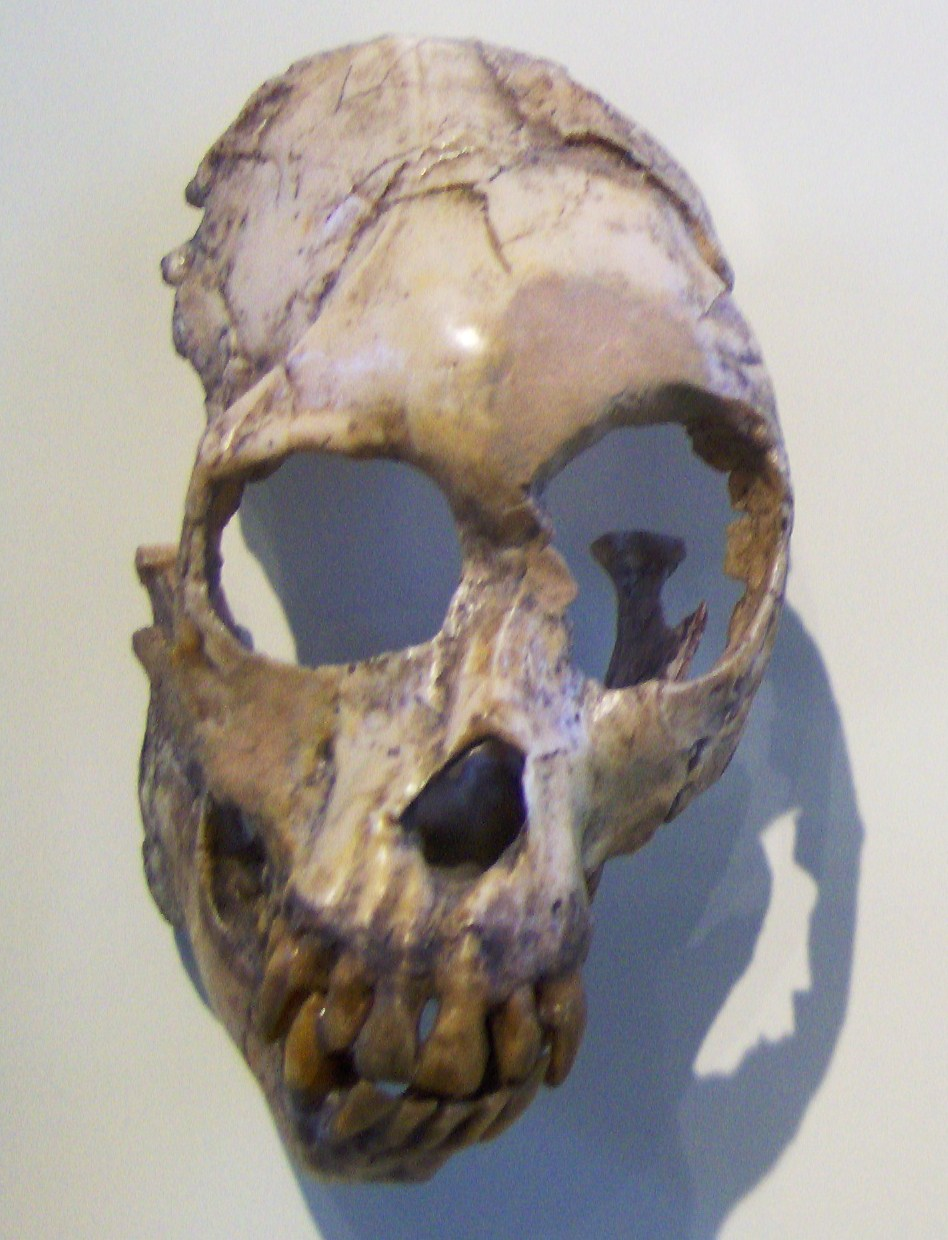
Skull of P. africanus.

Proconsul africanus had a dental formula of 2.1.2.3 on both the upper and lower jaws. The molars of this species had thin enamel and there was a prominent molar cingula. This species also possessed a robust zygomatic bone and a pronounced snout. This species had a broad interorbital region and small frontoethmoidal sinuses. The maxillary sinus was restricted. This species had an auditory region which would be similar to that of extant apes and cercopithecoid monkeys. The ectotympanic tube was well-developed. This species lacked a tail and the canines of this species were sexually dimorphic. The skull lacks supraorbital tori and can be considered somewhat prognathous. This species has a cranial capacity of 167 cm^{3} (10.2 cu in). and an encephalization quotient of 1.5. Based on the cranium, this species had an external brain surface much like that of gibbons and cercopithecoid monkeys. The wrist of this species has been described as monkey-like. This species has a talus in which the trochlear surface is highly curved and deeply grooved. The foot of this species possessed a transverse arch. Proconsul africanus had a brachial index of 96 which is comparable to the extant genus Pan. Overall the skeleton of this species can be described as being robust. This species had an average body mass of around 18 kg (40 lb).

Based upon the dental morphology, it is conjectured that Proconsul africanus was a frugivorous species; a study by Aiello in 1981 concluded it was a "below-branch feeder." Based on postcranial pieces, it was likely an arboreal quadruped.

== Other sources ==
- Morell, Virginia (1996). Ancestral Passions: The Leakey Family and the Quest for Humankind's Beginnings. Simon and Schuster. ISBN 9780684824703.

== See also ==
- List of fossil sites (with link directory)
- List of hominina (hominid) fossils (with images)
