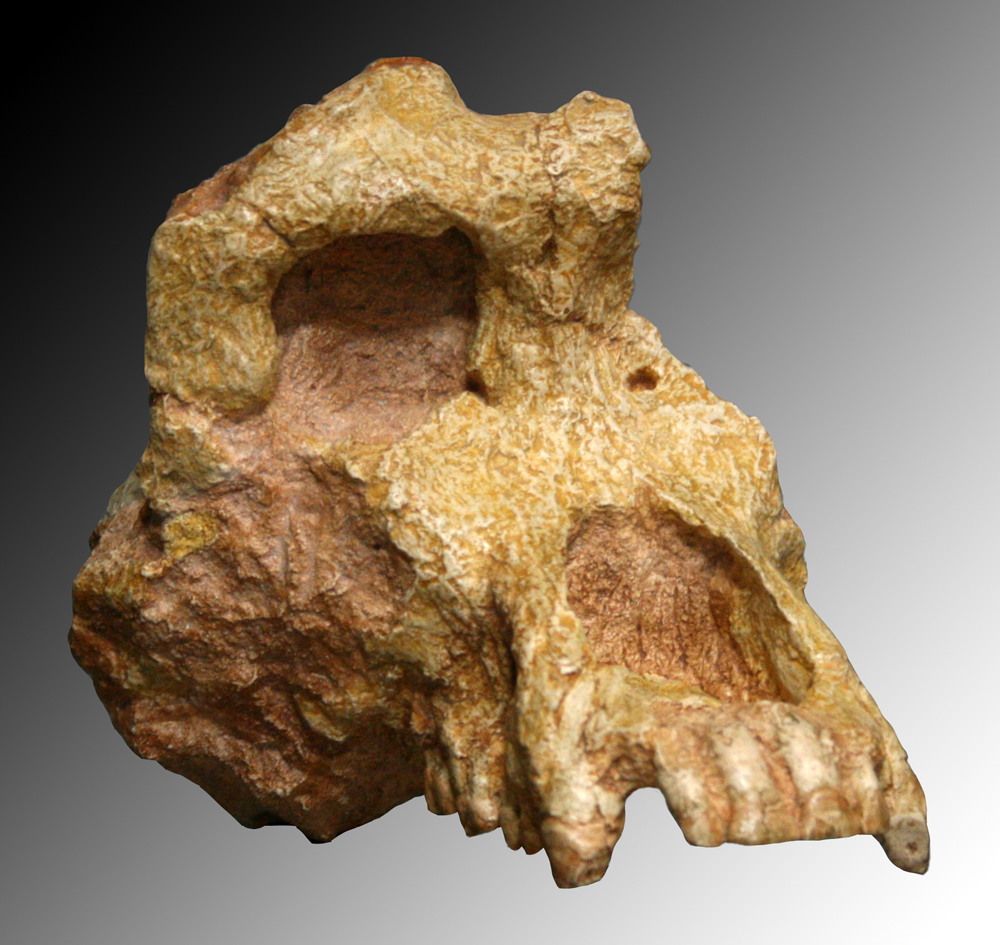
- Ouranopithecus macedoniensis skull in the French National Museum of Natural History, Paris

Scientific classification
- Kingdom: Animalia
- Phylum: Chordata
- Class: Mammalia
- Infraclass: Placentalia
- Order: Primates
- Superfamily: Hominoidea
- Family: Hominidae
- Genus: †Ouranopithecus
- Species: †O. macedoniensis

Binomial name
- †Ouranopithecus macedoniensis Bonis & Melentis, 1977

= Ouranopithecus macedoniensis =

Ouranopithecus macedoniensis Temporal range: 9.6–8.7 Million years ago

Extinct species of mammal

Ouranopithecus macedoniensis is a prehistoric species of Ouranopithecus from the Late Miocene of Greece. This species is known from three localities in Northern Greece. The first specimen of Ouranopithecus macedoniensis with upper deciduous teeth is described from the Ravin de la Pluie locality in Axios Valley. The other localities are Chalkidiki and Xirochori.

It is known from a large collection of cranial fossils and few postcranial. The material has been dated to the late Miocene 9.6–8.7 million years old, so slightly earlier than O. turkae. To some, this suggests O. turkae is the direct descendant of O. macedoniensis, although it is generally accepted that they are sister taxa.

== Etymology ==
The specific epithet macedoniensis is due to the holotype fossil's discovery location in Macedonia, Greece.

== Habitat ==
Examination of dental remains of O. macedoniensis and associated bovid species indicate a habitat of low tree cover and a rich herbaceous layer.

== Morphology ==
O. macedoniensis had a large, broad face with a prominent supraorbital torus. It also had square-shaped orbits. O. macedoniensis may have had a relatively large body size. The postcranial evidence is thin, but the dentition of O. macedoniensis suggests extreme sexual dimorphism, a far higher degree than that seen in any extant great ape. The ape was probably a quadruped. It is not possible to postulate on how O. macedoniensis used the trees but it seems likely that it did. O. macedoniensis's molar enamel cover was fairly thick and had low cusps. The male O. macedoniensis had large canine teeth with shearing lower premolars.

== Diet ==
Based on the heavily pitted surface of the second molar of Ouranopithecus macedoniensis, it is assumed that its diet consisted of harder foods such as nuts or tubers.

== Behaviour ==
Behaviour is very difficult to infer in species with such a small diversity of fossil remains. The large body size may have made climbing difficult in some aspects so it may have been a terrestrial forager but this is speculation within the literature.
