= Equatorius =

Equatorius Temporal range: Miocene 15.58–15.36 Ma

Scientific classification
- Domain: Eukaryota
- Kingdom: Animalia
- Phylum: Chordata
- Class: Mammalia
- Order: Primates
- Suborder: Haplorhini
- Infraorder: Simiiformes
- Superfamily: Hominoidea
- Family: incertae sedis
- Genus: †Equatorius; Ward et al. 1999

Type species
- †Equatorius africanus Ward et al. 1999

Extinct genus of primates

Equatorius is an extinct genus of kenyapithecine primate found in central Kenya at the Tugen Hills. Thirty-eight large teeth belonging to this middle Miocene hominid in addition to a mandibular and partially complete skeleton dated 15.58 Ma and 15.36 Ma. were later found.

== Analysis ==
The anatomical structures in part was seen to be similar to Afropithecus and Proconsul. Nevertheless, anatomy and morphology suggested the genus had an increased terrestrial habitat.

== Taxonomy ==
Ward et al. 1999, using their previous published study of K.africanus, based the separate definition on comparisons of gnathic and dental anatomy. The classification's validity was subsequently challenged.
