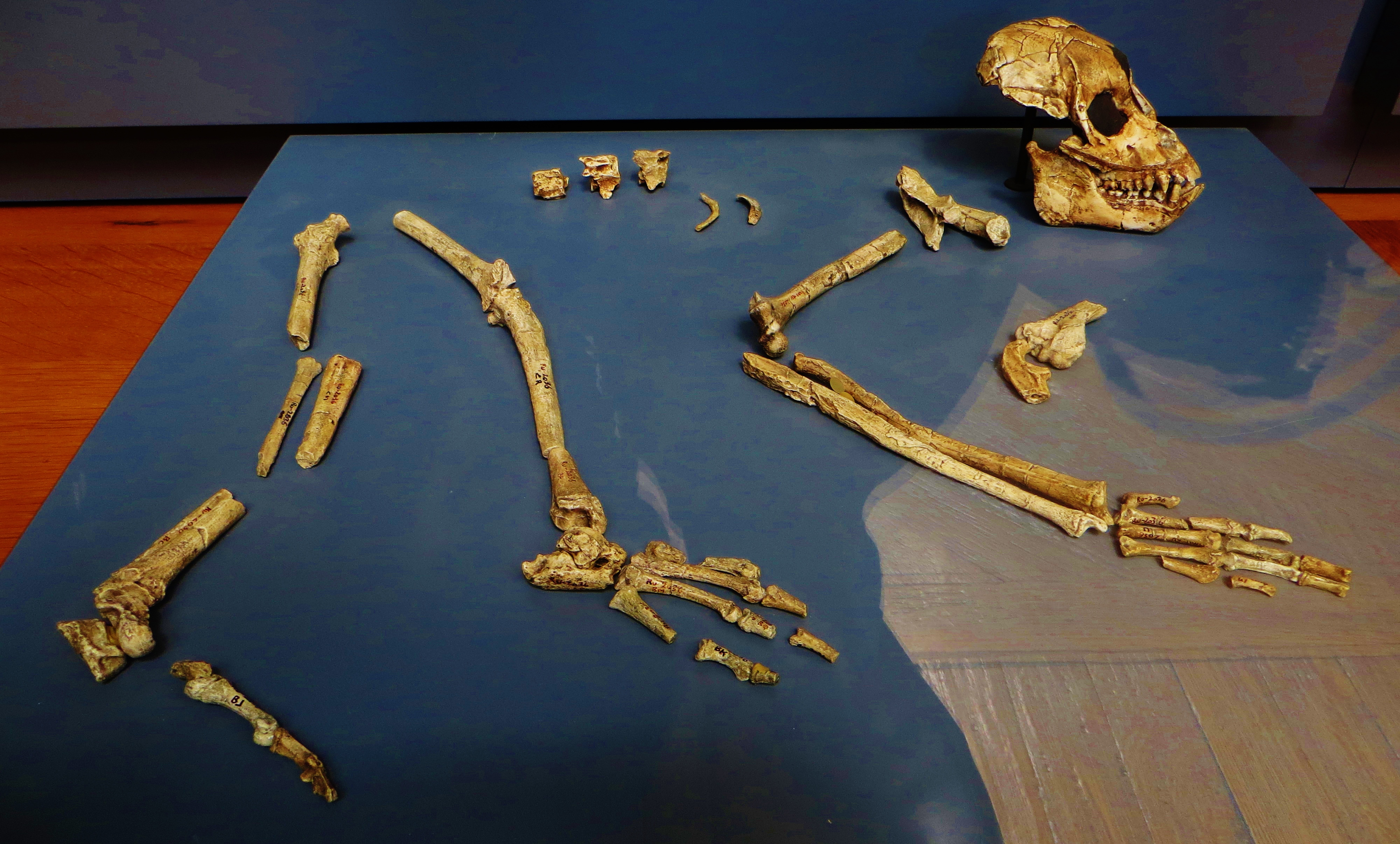
- Ekembo nyanzae skeleton (formerly Proconsul nyanzae)

Scientific classification
- Domain: Eukaryota
- Kingdom: Animalia
- Phylum: Chordata
- Class: Mammalia
- Order: Primates
- Suborder: Haplorhini
- Infraorder: Simiiformes
- Parvorder: Catarrhini
- Superfamily: Hominoidea
- Genus: †Ekembo; McNulty et al., 2015

Species
- Ekembo heseloni; Ekembo nyanzae

= Ekembo =

Ekembo Temporal range: Miocene, 20–11.608 Ma

Genus of extinct ape

Ekembo is an early ape (hominoid) genus found in 17- to 20-million-year-old sediments from the Miocene epoch. Specimens have been found at sites around the ancient Kisingiri volcano in Kenya on Rusinga Island and Mfangano Island in Lake Victoria. The name Ekembo is Suba for "ape" or "monkey".

To account for substantial morphological variation in the genus Proconsul, two species, P. nyanzae and P. heseloni, were placed in the new genus Ekembo. Ekembo is one of the earliest ape (Hominoids), after having diverged from the old world monkeys. The Dendropithecidae appear to be sister to Ekembo. Ekembo was found to be paraphyletic with respect to Proconsul and the more advanced Hominoidea.

== Description ==
Ekembo is distinguished from other early Miocene catarrhines on the basis of dental and mandibular morphology. The molars of Ekembo are more rounded or bunodont than those of Proconsul and the canine teeth taper to a point while those of Proconsul are more "blade-like". E. heseloni is medium-sized while E. nyanzae is larger. Both E. nyanzae and E. heseloni are moderately sexually dimorphic.

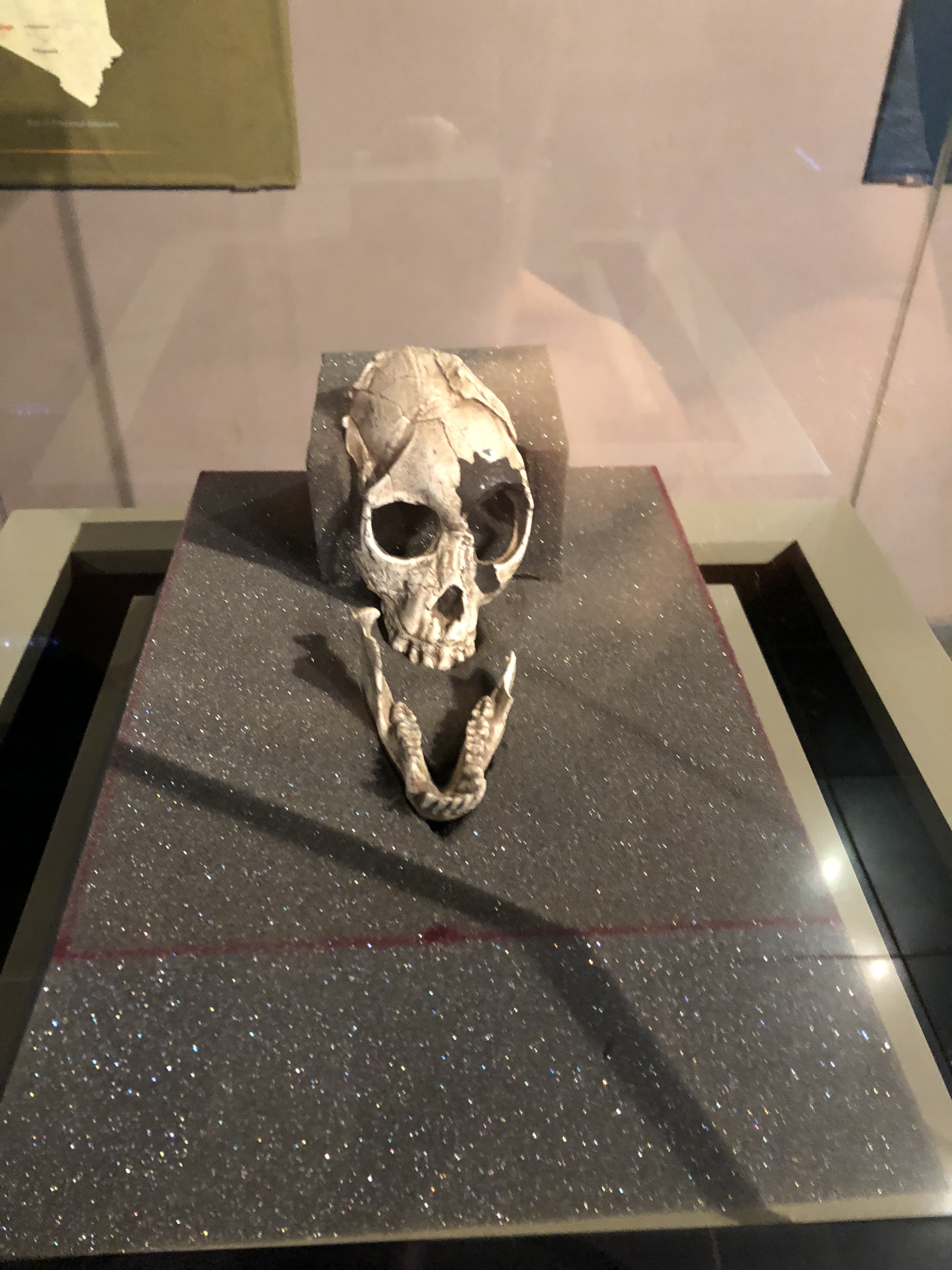
Skull of Ekembo heseloni from Kenya
