= Queen's Tower, Brisbane =

Residential skyscraper in Brisbane, Queensland

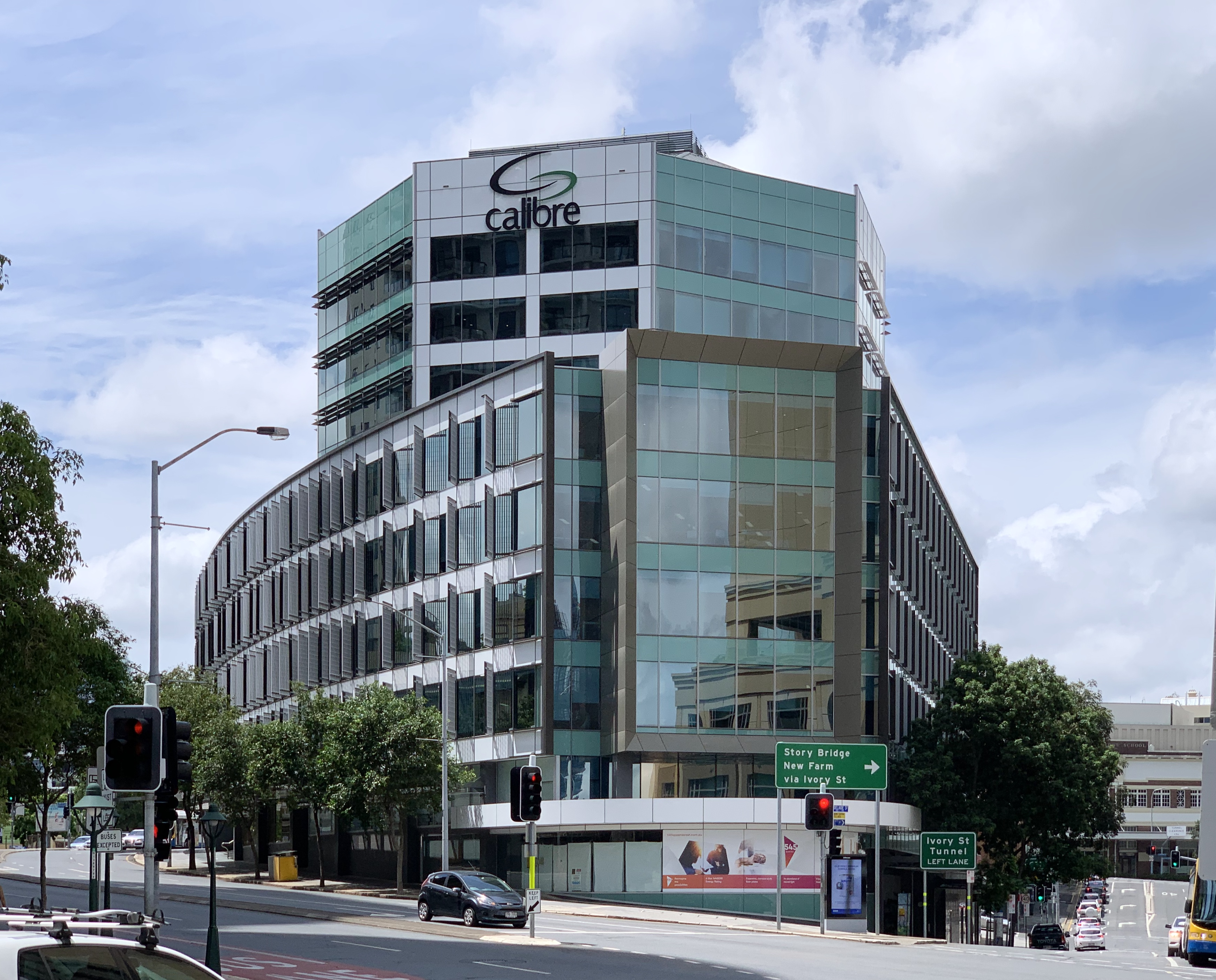
- A current commercial building at the site, 2020

General information
- Status: Proposed
- Type: Residential
- Location: Brisbane, Queensland, (Australia) , 545 Queen Street

Height
- Roof: 259 metres (850 ft)

Technical details
- Floor count: 76

Design and construction
- Architecture firm: Woods Bagot
- Developer: PDS Group

Website
- qwtower.com.au

The Queen's Tower is a proposed residential skyscraper to be located at 545 Queen Street in the north-east of Brisbane CBD in Queensland, Australia.

== Development ==
The development will occupy an island site between Queen, Adelaide and Macrossan Streets in Brisbane, Australia.

The 250-metre, 76-storey tower will include 891 luxury residences and 100 serviced apartments in one, two, three and four-bedroom apartment configurations.

Recreation area with swimming pool, café, gymnasium, function space and lush landscaping will be located on podium rooftop. Retail space (approximately 2,500m2) is planned for the ground level. The tower will have Brisbane's deepest basement, 17 levels below the surface, for 853 cars, 71 motorcycles and 752 bicycles. The car park will only be accessible by four car lifts.

A current ten storey commercial building at the site will be demolished.

Development application was lodged with the Brisbane City Council in March 2016.

== See also ==
- List of tallest buildings in Brisbane
