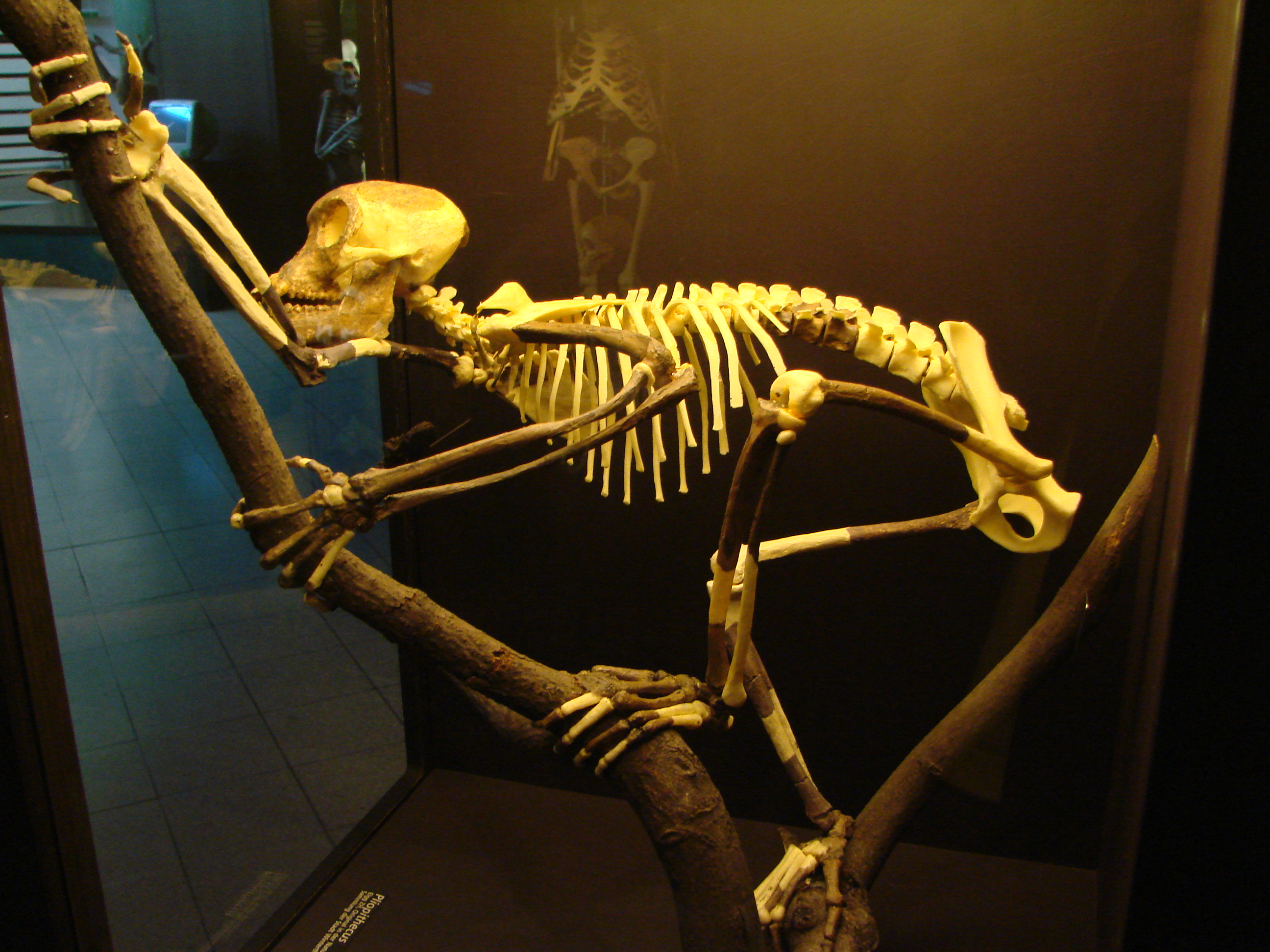
- Proconsul skeleton reconstruction

Scientific classification
- Kingdom: Animalia
- Phylum: Chordata
- Class: Mammalia
- Order: Primates
- Parvorder: Catarrhini
- Superfamily: Hominoidea
- Family: †Proconsulidae; Leakey, 1963

= Proconsulidae =

Proconsulidae Temporal range: Oligocene - Miocene 28.4–11.61 Ma

Extinct family of primates

Proconsulidae is an early family of primates that lived during the Miocene epoch in Kenya, and was restricted to Africa. Members of the family have a mixture of Old World monkey and ape characteristics, so the placement in the ape superfamily Hominoidea is tentative; some scientists place Proconsulidae outside of Hominoidea in a separate superfamily Proconsuloidea, before the split of the apes and Old World monkeys.

== Discovery and classification ==
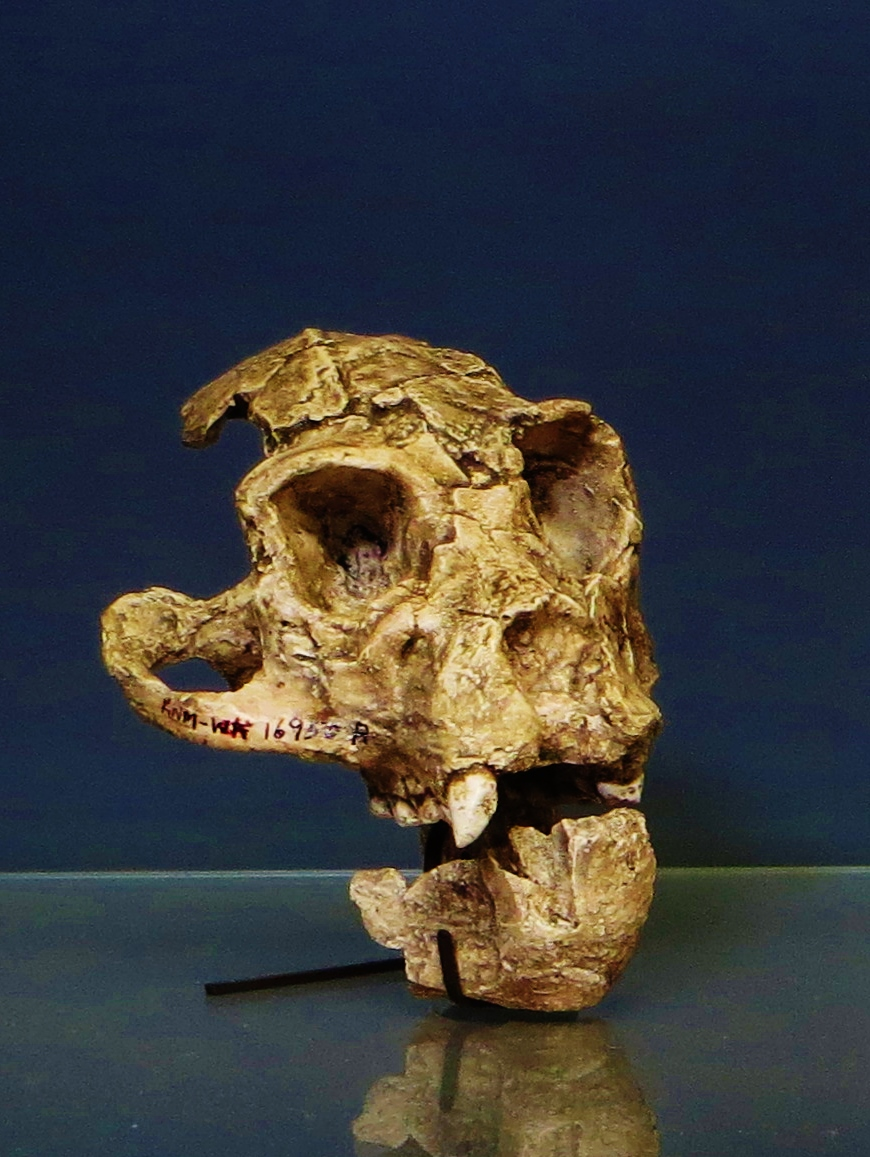
Turkanapithecus kalakolensis fossil, Muséum national d'histoire naturelle, Paris

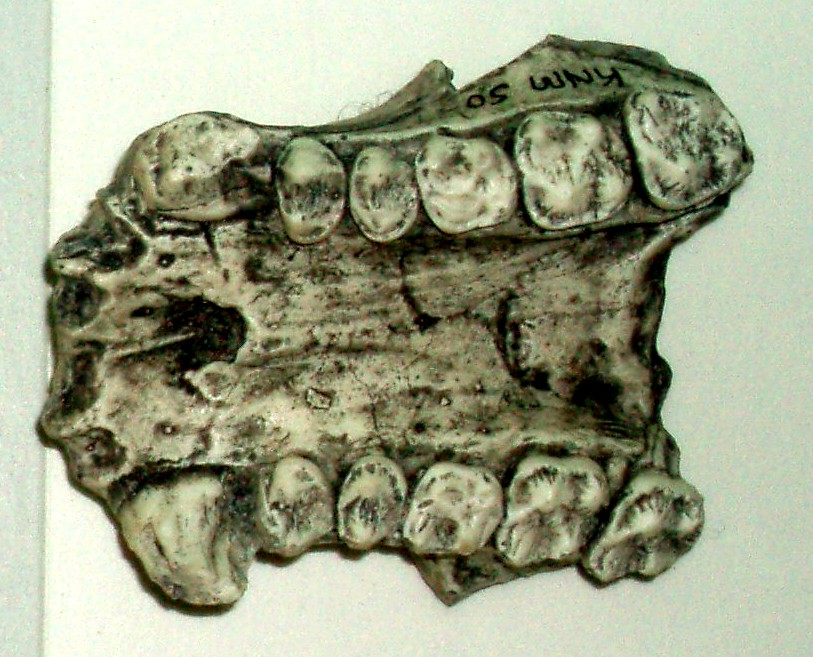
Rangwapithecus gordoni jaw

The first specimen, a partial jaw discovered in 1909 by a gold prospector at Koru, near Kisumu in western Kenya, was also the oldest fossil hominoid known until recently, and the first fossil mammal ever found in sub-Saharan Africa. The name, Proconsul, was devised by Arthur Hopwood in 1933 and means "before Consul"; the name of a famous captive chimp in London. At the time Consul was being used as a circus name for performing chimpanzees. The Folies Bergère of 1903 in Paris had a popular performing chimpanzee named Consul, and so did the Belle Vue Zoo in Manchester, England, in 1894. On the latter's death in that year Ben Brierley wrote a commemorative poem wondering where the "Missing Link" between chimpanzees and men was.

Hopwood in 1931 had discovered the fossils of three individuals while expeditioning with Louis Leakey in the vicinity of Lake Victoria. The Consul that he selected to use in the name was neither of the ones mentioned above, but another located in the London Zoo. Consul is being used Linnaean-style to symbolize the chimpanzee. Proconsul is therefore "ancestral to the Chimpanzee" in Hopwood's words. He also added africanus as the species name.

Other fossils discovered later were initially classified as africanus and subsequently reclassified; that is, the total pool of fossils originally considered africanus was "split" and the fragments "lumped" with other finds to create a new species. For example, Mary Leakey's famous find of 1948 began as africanus and was split from it to be lumped with Thomas Whitworth's finds of 1951 as heseloni by Alan Walker in 1993.

The family of Proconsulidae was first proposed by Louis Leakey, eleven years after he and Wilfrid Le Gros Clark had defined africanus, nyanzae and major. It was not immediately accepted but ultimately prevailed.

The history of hominoid classification in the second half of the 20th century is sufficiently complex to warrant a few books itself. Most of the palaeoanthropologists have changed their minds at least once as new fossils have come to light and new observations have made, and will probably continue to do so. The classifications found in the literature of one decade are not generally the same as those of another. For example, in 1987 Peter Andrews and Lawrence Martin, established palaeontologists, took the point of view that Proconsul is not a hominoid, but is a sister taxon to it.

== Taxonomy ==
- Proconsuloidea or Hominoidea
  - Proconsulidae Leakey, 1963
    - Proconsulinae Leakey, 1963
      - Proconsul Hopwood, 1933
        - Proconsul africanus Hopwood, 1933
        - Proconsul gitongai (Pickford & Kunimatsu, 2005)
        - Proconsul major Le Gros Clark & Leakey, 1950
        - Proconsul meswar Harrison & Andrews, 2009

Formerly considered as a subfamily of proconsulids, it is now thought that the Nyanzapithecinae are instead related to the Dendropithecidae, a basal ape clade.
