= Salvi Moya =

Spanish footballer

Personal information
- Full name: Salvador Moya Muñoz
- Date of birth: 20 October 1996 (age 30)
- Place of birth: Tomares, Spain
- Position: Forward

Team information
- Current team: Tomares

Youth career
- 2006–2011: Tomares
- 2011–2013: Sevilla
- 2013–2014: Tomares
- 2014–2015: Recreativo

Senior career*
| Years | Team | Apps | (Gls) |
| 2013–2014 | Tomares | 7 | (8) |
| 2015–2017 | Recreativo B | 64 | (15) |
| 2015 | Recreativo | 1 | (0) |
| 2017–2018 | Sevilla C | 4 | (0) |
| 2018– | Tomares | 38 | (21) |
- * Club domestic league appearances and goals as of 8 March 2020

Salvador 'Salvi' Moya Muñoz (born 20 October 1996) is a Spanish footballer who plays for UD Tomares as a forward.

== Football career ==
Born in Tomares, Seville, Andalusia, Moya joined Sevilla FC's youth setup in 2011, aged 15, after starting it out at lowly locals UD Tomares. In 2013, however, he was released and returned to his previous club, making his debuts as a senior in the regional leagues.

In January 2014 Moya joined Recreativo de Huelva, initially assigned to the Juvenil squad. On 18 January of the following year he appeared with the reserves in a 2–1 Tercera División home win against Écija Balompié, scoring his team's last goal.

On 22 February 2015 Moya first appeared for the main squad, coming on as a late substitute for Braulio in a 1–2 away loss against CD Lugo in the Segunda División.
