= Els Hostalets de Pierola =

- Municipality
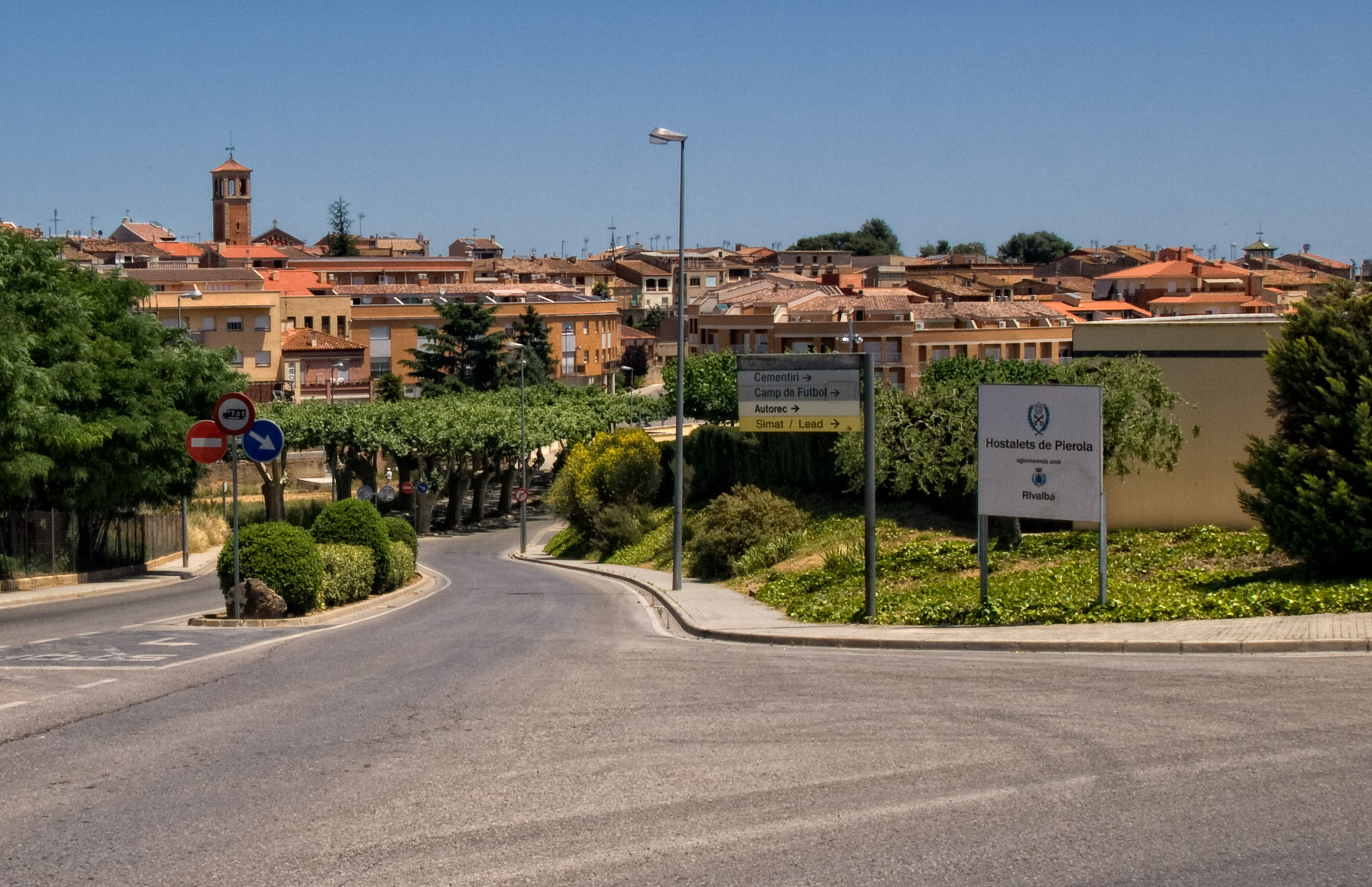

- Location in the Province of Barcelona Location in Catalonia Location in Spain
- Coordinates: 41°32′8″N 1°46′19″E
- Country: Spain
- Community: Catalonia
- Province: Barcelona
- Comarca: Anoia

Government
  - Mayor: Gerard Parcerisas Valls (2019)

Area
  - Total: 33.5 km^{2} (12.9 sq mi)
- Elevation: 474 m (1,555 ft)

Population (2025)
  - Total: 3,258
  - Density: 97.3/km^{2} (252/sq mi)
- Demonym: Pierolenc
- Postal code: 08781
- Website: elshostaletsdepierola.cat

Els Hostalets de Pierola (Catalan pronunciation: [əlz ustəˈlɛdz ðə piəˈɾɔlə]) is a Spanish municipality situated in the Autonomous Community of Catalonia, province of Barcelona, Spain.

The municipality includes the villages of Els Hostalets de Pierola, els Boscos de Can Martí, Can Fontimarc, Can Fonsalba, Can Gras, Can Marcet, Can Rovira de l'Estela, Pierola and Serra Alta.

== History ==
The castle of Pierola, of which nothing remains, was cited in documents in 963. It belonged to the vicecounty of Barcelona from the tenth to the thirteenth century. In 1286 it was given by Alfonso II of Aragon to Asbert of Mediona. In 1698 Pau Ignasi of Dalmases bought the barony of Pierola. Afterwards it remained in the hands of the Fontcuberta family who kept it until the end of the manorialism

The municipality became internationally famous because of the 2002 discovery of a Miocene primate, the Pierolapithecus catalaunicus, a fossil of great interest for human evolution. The genus was named after the municipality.

== Main sights ==
The church of the municipality is dedicated to Saint Peter (Sant Pere) and was constructed in 1852 in the place in which an ancient Roman temple was found. The church of Pierola, also dedicated to Saint Peter, is of Roman origin and appears in documents from 1060. Near the border with the municipality of Collbató (Baix Llobregat comarca), a hermitage, also Roman, dedicated to Saint Christopher of Canyelles was described as early as 1033.

== Events ==
Els Hostalets de Pierola celebrates its major festival in July. In September a festival of wine takes place.

== Economy ==
The principal economic activity is dryland farming, especially cereal and wine. There are also small industries.

Currently, as a consequence of the political development under the former mayor Pedro Barbado (PSC), this municipality has one of the most important sites of trash and other storage in all of Catalonia, which is now one of the major sources of income for the municipality.

== Twin towns ==
- Rivalba, Italy
