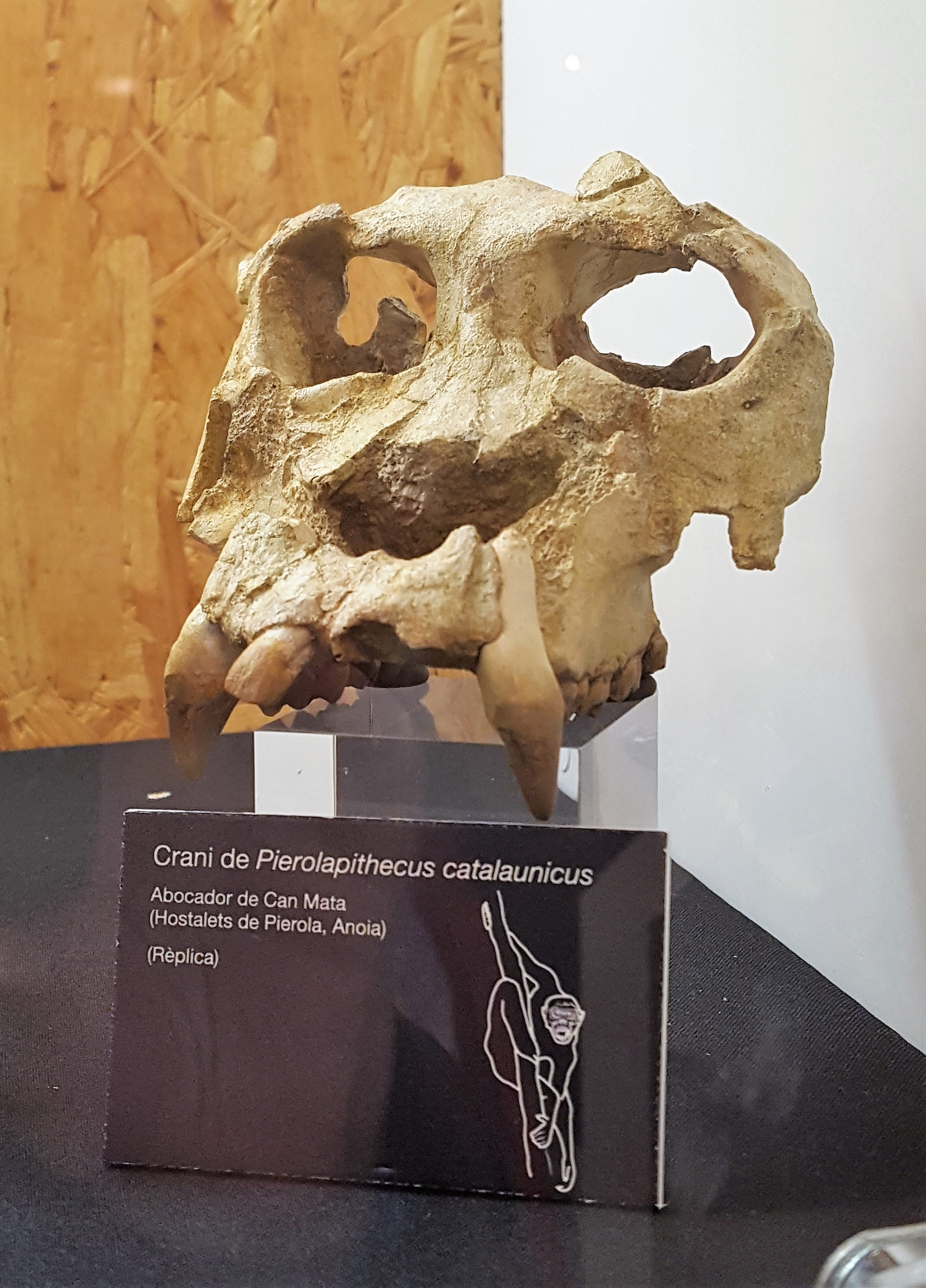
- Pierolapithecus catalaunicus

Scientific classification
- Kingdom: Animalia
- Phylum: Chordata
- Class: Mammalia
- Infraclass: Placentalia
- Order: Primates
- Superfamily: Hominoidea
- Family: Hominidae
- Subfamily: incertae sedis
- Genus: †Pierolapithecus; Moyà-Solà et al., 2004
- Species: †P. catalaunicus

Binomial name
- †Pierolapithecus catalaunicus Moyà-Solà et al., 2004

= Pierolapithecus =

Pierolapithecus Temporal range: Miocene, 13–12.5 Ma

Extinct species of ape from Miocene Europe

Pierolapithecus catalaunicus is an extinct species of ape that lived during the Middle Miocene, about 13–12.5 million years ago, in Catalonia, Spain. Described in 2004 from a partial skeleton discovered near Els Hostalets de Pierola, it is represented by one of the most complete Miocene ape skeletons from Europe.

Pierolapithecus combined primitive features with orthograde adaptations, while lacking the elongated fingers characteristic of modern suspensory apes. Its anatomy has made it important in debates on the early evolution of great apes and the origins of orthograde locomotion. Its phylogenetic position remains disputed: some researchers regard Pierolapithecus as a basal member of Hominidae close to the common ancestor of living great apes, while others place it among the pongines or European Dryopithecini.

== History ==
The splanchnocranium was discovered in 2002 and systematic excavations took place during May and June 2003. The species was described by a team of Spanish paleoanthropologists led by Salvador Moyà-Solà on the basis of a fossil skeleton, IPS21350 (nicknamed Pau ("peace" in Catalan as it was announced alongside Spanish demonstrations against the Iraq War)), discovered in December 2002. The finding was first reported in the journal Science on November 19, 2004. The skeleton is of an adult male individual, composed of 83 bones that make up the splanchnocranium, both maxillae, a complete set of cheek teeth, both canines, a right central incisor, zygomatics, lacrimals, a partial frontal, carpals, metacarpals, manual phalanges from two hands, tarsals, metatarsals, pedal phalanges, right patellar distal epiphysis, a left radius, some long bone diaphyses, two pelvic pieces, three vertebrae, two intact ribs, and twelve rib fragments of large size. They named their new genus after the nearby village Els Hostalets de Pierola, and Catalonia respectively.

== Description ==
Moyà-Solà et al. initially founded the species on a set of unique characteristics, of which are the following. The frontal processes of the face remain on the same plane, the nasals are flat and sit beneath the lower rims of the orbit, the glabella is posteriorly oriented, the face is low, the brows are thin, the zygomatic root is high, and the nasoalveolar clivus is high. The rear border of the incisive foramen is in line with the P3, the palate is deep and stout, the nasal aperture is widest at the base, the interorbital distance is wide, the zygomatics expand to the side, the P3 is similar in size to the P4, there is reduced cusp heteromorphy, all molars save from the M3 are elongated, the upper molars and premolars lack cingula, the lingual cusps of the upper molars are positioned peripherally, the M2 is large and has cusp heteromorphy, and the upper canine is large and compressed in the crown. The ribs are very curved to form a thorax that is anteroposteriorly compressed, the clavicle is robust, lacking a ventral keel on the mid-lumbars, the pedicles of the neural arch are robust and stout, the spinous processes are slightly caudally inclined, the pedicle-body inserts the transverse processes, dorsally oriented and pedicle-born transverse process, the metacarpals and phalanges are short, the os centrale are unfused, the triquetrum is small and non-articulating with the ulnar styloid, and the crevice inserting meniscus attachment and pisiform facet is distally shifted.

The holotypic individual is estimated to have weighed 30 kg (66.13 lbs).

== Locomotion ==
Overall, the adduction and supination capacity of the wrist, specially built thorax, scapular shift to the back (which was inferred through the long, chimpanzee-like clavicles), and stiff lumbar vertebrae suggest that positional behavior and orthograde locomotion were emphasized. This type of movement is diagnostic for all extant apes including humans, but it is rarely documented in the fossil record. Other hominids that have this suite are Oreopithecus and, although less skeletally complete, Dryopithecus. Earlier taxa—Proconsul, Afropithecus, Equatorius, Nacholapithecus—retain basal characters and the similarly-aged Morotopithecus practiced orthograde locomotion but was probably sister to apes (based on facial structure). The shortened phalanges suggest ancestral palmigrade adaptations, but it is unlikely Pierolapithecus practiced much or any suspensory behavior. However, vertical climbing and suspension are independent abilities that are integral to ape evolution. Below-branch suspension may have evolved repeatedly or in convergence later and independently in the ape lineage.

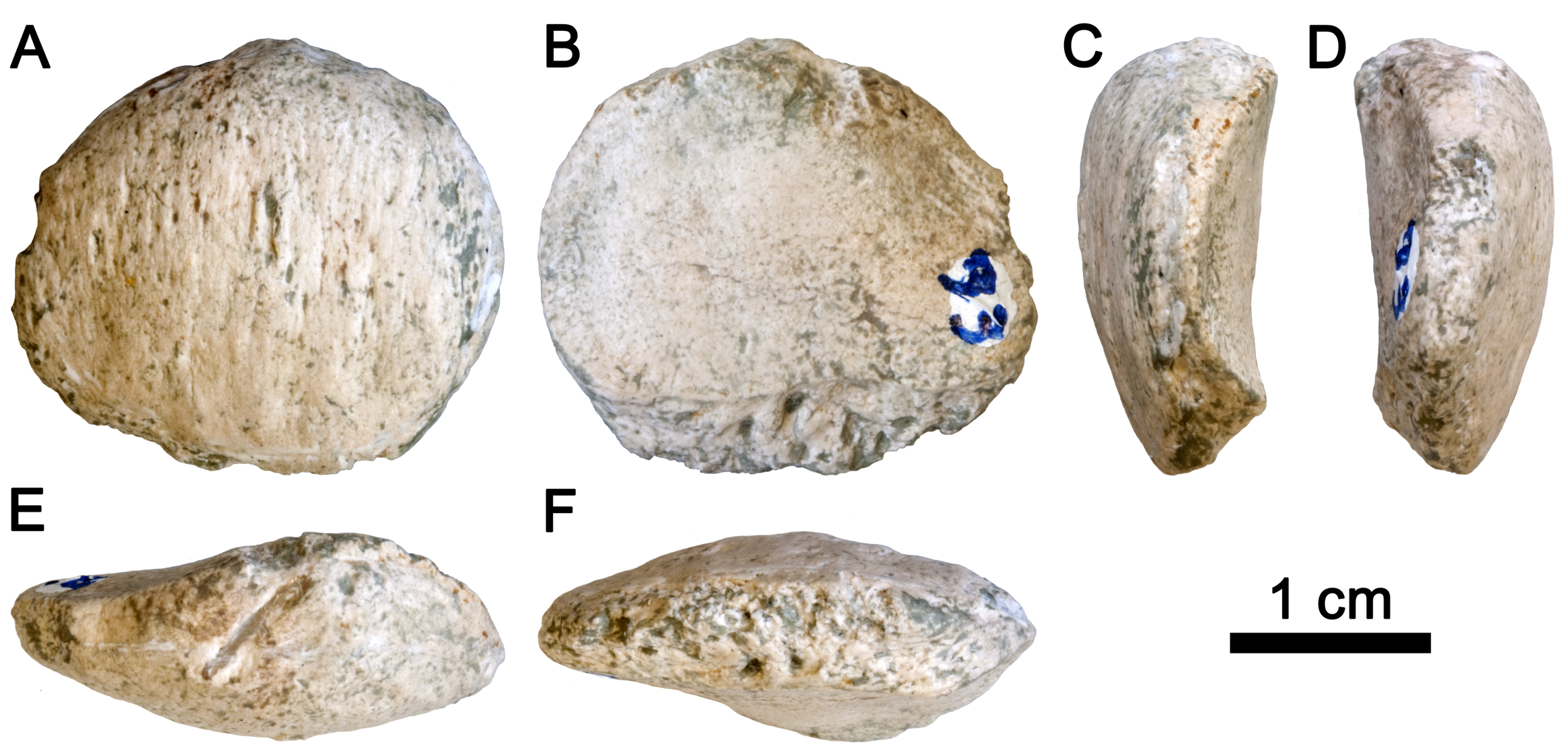
Patella of the holotype P. catalaunicus

Further analysis suggests that very long and curved phalanges is decoupled with orthograde features related to vertical climbing being acquired. The condition in this genus is related to a retained pronograde plan. Although the lumbars, ribs, and carpals are orthograde, the degree of this in the phalanges is only slight. Many traits were independently acquired, leading to new advances being superimposed and basal characters retained for an extended time. Pierolapithecus lacked adaptations for suspensory hanging, but it may have still been capable of doing so, only that it was not adaptively relevant. Although, the latter remains disputed.

The patella was like extant apes in dimensions, which is typically regarded as having a mobile knee. Pierolapithecus differs from monkeys, hylobatids, and basal hominoids through thicker patellae. As such, a derived knee might be related to enhanced climbing, notably vertical climbing. The pelvis shares an ancestral template with Proconsul nyanzae, which was modified for orthograde behavior (assuming that hypothesis is accepted), and suggests homoplasy in ape pelves.

== Classification ==
Pierolapithecus demonstrates derived facial features and apelike skeletal adaptations that suggest that it is an early member of the ape clade. This genus, 12.5-13 mya in age, postdates the hylobatid-hominid split, which occurred anywhere from 14.9±2 or 14.6±2.6 mya. Much of the skeleton is derived, but the shortened phalanges are indicative of palmigrade adaptations that are primitive. This mosaic is important in ape evolution. The large amount of homoplasy in ape locomotion creates considerable taxonomic confusion. The late Middle Miocene is the farthest trace of a Pierolapithecus-like character group, and assuming that this identifies the earliest apes, is the farthest trace of hominids. As well, early hominids are substantially more primitive than estimated, which may explain why no early great apes were previously reported. These early traits would have been maintained, overlaid, and modified to suite new adaptations that occurred independently.

Pierolapithecus and Anoiapithecus may be synonymous with Dryopithecus, but both have enough craniofacial differences to justify separation. Placement as a basal hominid is supported by the comparison of the thick enamel from the afropithecids, which may be ancestral to apes. Other hypotheses are that the taxon represents a stem pongine. Rather than a full common ancestor, it has been suggested that the species may be ancestral to humans, chimpanzees and gorillas but not orangutans, given certain facial characteristics. This genus is distinguished from pongines and share traits with extant hominines, suggesting a sister relationship with Dryopithecus (possibly in a tribe called Dryopithecini, having thick and thin enamel much like Ardipithecus/australopiths and Pan/hominins). A reconstruction of the face of Pierolapithecus catalaunicus indicates its morphology as most consistent with a phylogenetic placement as a stem hominid.

== Paleoecology ==
Pierolapithecus bore thick enamel found in hard-object feeders, but its diet is not yet known aside from possibly having fed in trees like orangutans. It was discovered at the locality of BCV1, which formed when the northwestern Mediterranean rifted to form a stretch between two mountain ranges. The proximal to distal-marginal alluvial-fan sediments cover the Miocene. It was discovered as a fossiliferous area by Guerín in the 1920s with an ape M2 mistaken as a suid, followed by the discovery of Dryopithecus fontani, Hispanopithecus laietanus, and Sivapithecus occidentalis in the area. From the area hailing Pierolapithecus specifically was explored from the 1950s–1970s from a garbage dump. 19 large and small mammals were discovered at the site, almost 300 macroinvertebrate fossils, and 83 hominid fossils (composing the holotype skeleton).

The fauna comprises the Pierolapithecus, megaherbivores like elephants, and various others like carnivores, artiodactyls, turtles, and small-medium fragments. Pierolapithecus bears evidence of scavenging whereas the other fossils show signs of being scattered across an alluvial plain. The micromammals show signs of digestion by predators, probably by barn owls and others. The environment was quite humid, warm, and forested. The fauna is most like France and central Europe in composition. More insectivores, arboreal dormice, and flying squirrels support a humid environment, and the open woodlands of other sites would have made hominid occupation impossible.

That Pierolapithecus would be ancestral to modern great apes is debated largely because this great ape was found in the Iberian Peninsula, while most of the fossil evidence of the evolution of hominids and hominins has been located in East Africa and Southeast Asia. Because the Mediterranean Sea contracted several times in the past, migration of terrestrial fauna between Africa and Europe was permitted.

Pierolapithecus, like many other Miocene apes, is predicted to have been polygynous by its low second-to-fourth digit ratios, which are reflective of high prenatal androgen effects and correlated with polygyny in apes.

== See also ==
- Anoiapithecus – Extinct genus of ape from the Miocene
- Chororapithecus – Extinct hominine genus from the Miocene
- Griphopithecus – Extinct genus of primates
- Nakalipithecus – Extinct species of ape
- Samburupithecus – Extinct genus of primate from Miocene Kenya
