= Ouranopithecus turkae =

Ouranopithecus turkae Temporal range: 8.7–7.4 Million years ago

Scientific classification
- Kingdom: Animalia
- Phylum: Chordata
- Class: Mammalia
- Order: Primates
- Suborder: Haplorhini
- Family: Hominidae
- Genus: †Ouranopithecus
- Species: †O. turkae

Binomial name
- †Ouranopithecus turkae Güleç, Sevim, Pehlevan & Kaya, 2007

Extinct species of mammal

Ouranopithecus turkae is a prehistoric species of Ouranopithecus from the Late Miocene of Turkey.

This is known from the Çorakyerler locality, Çankırı Province, central Anatolia. It is known only from three cranial fossils. Dated faunal remains associated with the O. turkae fossils have been attributed to the late Miocene 8.7–7.4 million years ago, making O. turkae one of the youngest Eurasian great apes ever known.

Sevim-Erol et al. (2023) described Anadoluvius turkae, a new name, based on the mostly complete male palate preserving LI1-M3 and RC-M2 and a series of paratypes. The holotype is CO-205, and paratypes are CO-300 (right M2), CO-305 (male mandibular fragment), CO-710 (female mandibular fragment), CO-2100 (right I1), and CO-2800 (female partial cranium). The genus name derives from Anadolu, a Turkish denomination that describes something that is Anatolian.

== Etymology ==
Ouranopithecus turkae was so named due to its similarities with its probable sister taxon O. macedoniensis. The species name turkae acknowledges the discovery of the holotype fossils in the Republic of Turkey.

== Habitat ==
Associated faunal remains suggest O. turkae lived in either open woodland or an open savannah type environment.

== Morphology ==
The morphology of O. turkae is difficult to determine due to the complete lack of post-cranial remains. The post-canine dentary is second only to that of Gigantopithecus in size, perhaps suggesting a large body size. It is unknown whether the species was sexually dimorphic as there are no known female fossils. The ape was probably a quadruped but there is no evidence to confirm this.

== Diet ==
Tooth morphology and wear suggest a diet of tough, abrasive food, the kind typically found in the type of environment O. turkae probably lived in.

== Behaviour ==
The lack of post-cranial remains makes it difficult to determine how O. turkae behaved. The fossils were not associated with any females of the species so it could be suggested that the males, at least, were solitary. It may also be assumed that O. turkae climbed trees, possibly to feed or to avoid predation, although their suggested large body size may have made climbing difficult. Some believe O. turkae was probably a terrestrial forager and did not feed in the trees.
