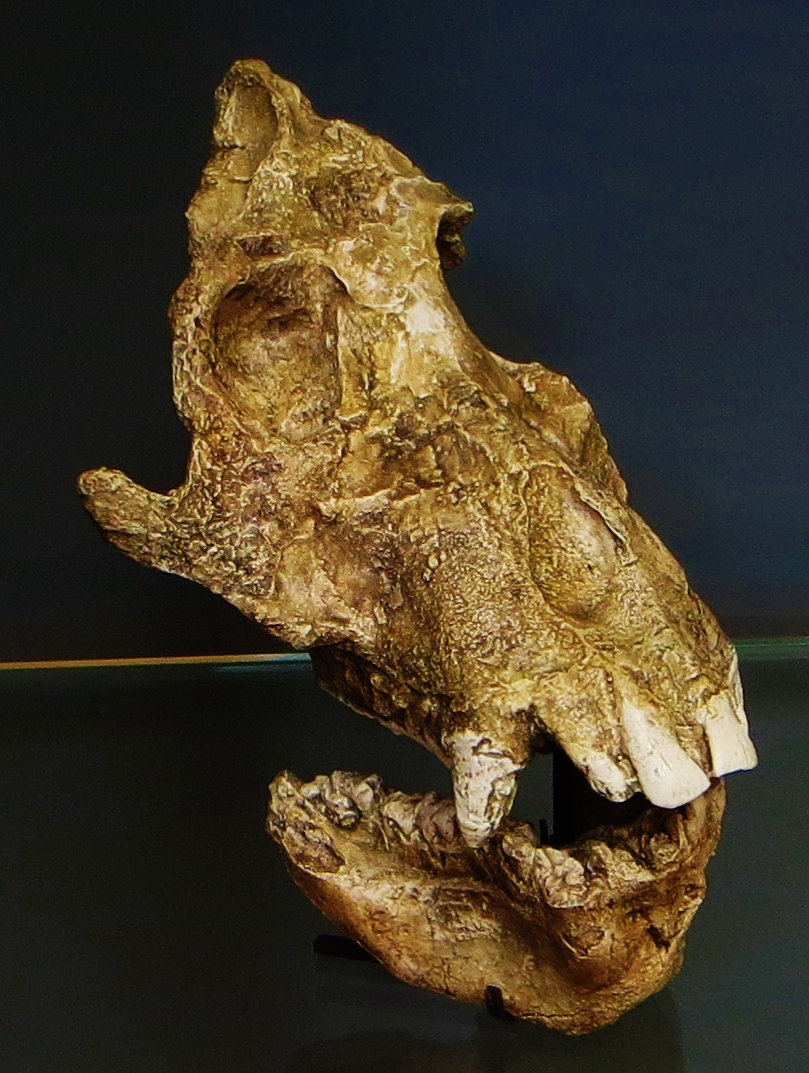
- Skull cast

Scientific classification
- Kingdom: Animalia
- Phylum: Chordata
- Class: Mammalia
- Order: Primates
- Superfamily: Hominoidea
- Family: †Afropithecidae
- Genus: †Afropithecus; Leakey & Leakey, 1986
- Species: †A. turkanensis

Binomial name
- †Afropithecus turkanensis Leakey & Leakey, 1986

= Afropithecus =

Afropithecus Temporal range: 18–16 Ma Miocene

Extinct genus of hominoids

Afropithecus is a genus of Miocene hominoid with the sole species Afropithecus turkanensis, it was excavated from a small site near Lake Turkana called Kalodirr in northern Kenya in 1986 and named by Richard Leakey and Meave Leakey. The estimated age of Afropithecus is between 16 and 18 million years old, which was determined with radiometric dating techniques and the geological studies conducted by Broschetto and Brown from the University of Utah. In total there are 46 recovered specimens from Kalodirr relating to Afropithecus consisting of cranial, mandible, dentition and post-cranial remains. The type specimen of Afropithecus turkanensis is KNM-WK 16999.

== Morphology ==
Richard Leakey and Meave Leakey first described Afropithecus turkanensis to be a large hominoid which appeared to have relatively thick enamel. Leakey suggested that A. turkanensis shared postcranial features with the species Proconsul nyanzae, which is the best-known Miocene genus with literally hundreds of fossils having been found representing almost all skeletal elements, and sharing cranial features with Aegyptopithecus zeuxis and Heliopithecus which had two weathered molars that indicated a general distinction from known large early catarrhines, and later concluded that A. turkanenensis was a primitive, arboreal quadruped similar to P. nyanzae, and that A. turkanensis had primitive facial morphology and derived dental characteristics that would suggest a diet of hard fruits. Leakey also synonymised Heliopithecus with Afropithecus.

=== Cranial morphology ===
The type specimen, KNM-WT 16999 is composed of a long distinct snout, the facial skeleton, frontal, much of the coronal structure, most of the sphenoid, and relatively unworn adult dentition; the right orbit (virtually complete), the right zygomatic, the pterygoid, most of the sphenoid and lesser wings, the maxilla and premaxilla, and adult dentition with procumbent incisors. The surface on the right side maxilla and premaxilla along with the enamel on the right molars has been lost over time and has been replaced with calcite crystals, which only provide the general shape and not the details.

From dentition it is known that the palate, which is almost completely calcified, of A. turkanensis is shallow, long and narrow with tooth rows that converge posteriorly, and it is probable the tooth rows were originally nearly parallel. A. turkanensis had a 6.5 mm diastema between its very procumbent second incisor (KNM-WT 16999 had large, broad incisors) and the canine.

The thickness of the enamel on the molars is often reported when fossils are being recorded and used to make comparisons across taxa. The thickness is referred to either as "thin" or "thick" and is commonly assessed as a linear measurement of the enamel on worn or naturally fractured teeth. From enamel testing it has been suggested that A. turkanensis is the oldest-known thick-enamelled hominoid, which is what would distinguish it from Kenyapithecus.

=== Post-cranial morphology ===
Post cranial remains such as KNM-WK 16901, includes an associated right fibula (lacking the proximal portion, and is approximately the same size as Pan troglodytes; 184 mm), a right proximal third metatarsal, a right fourth metatarsal lacking the head, and an incomplete first metatarsal head.

Other post-cranial remains include: KNM-WK 17016P a large right ulna, and foot or hand bones: KNM-WK 17008, KNM-WK 18395.

== Feeding ==
Morphological analysis of the teeth and palate of Afropithecus suggests that it utilized a sclerocarpic foraging diet similar to members of Pitheciidae, in contrast to that of Morotopithecus.

== See also ==
- Griphopithecus
- Graecopithecus
- Chororapithecus
- Dryopithecus
- Pierolapithecus
- Samburupithecus
