= Queen's Tower (Pirgos Vasilissis) =

Former royal estate near Athens, Greece

Coordinates: 38.041543°N 23.721597°E

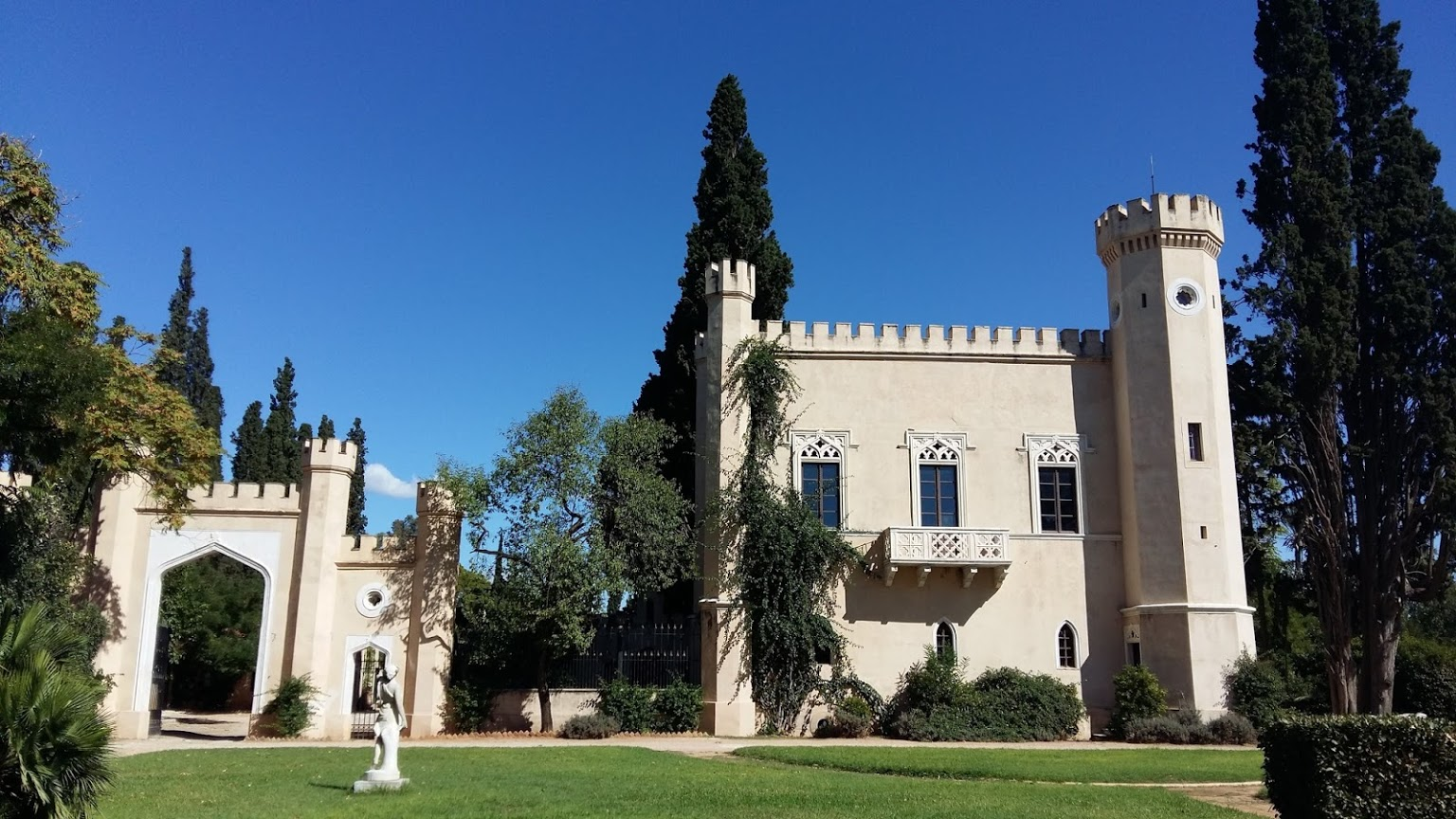
The tower, in 2018

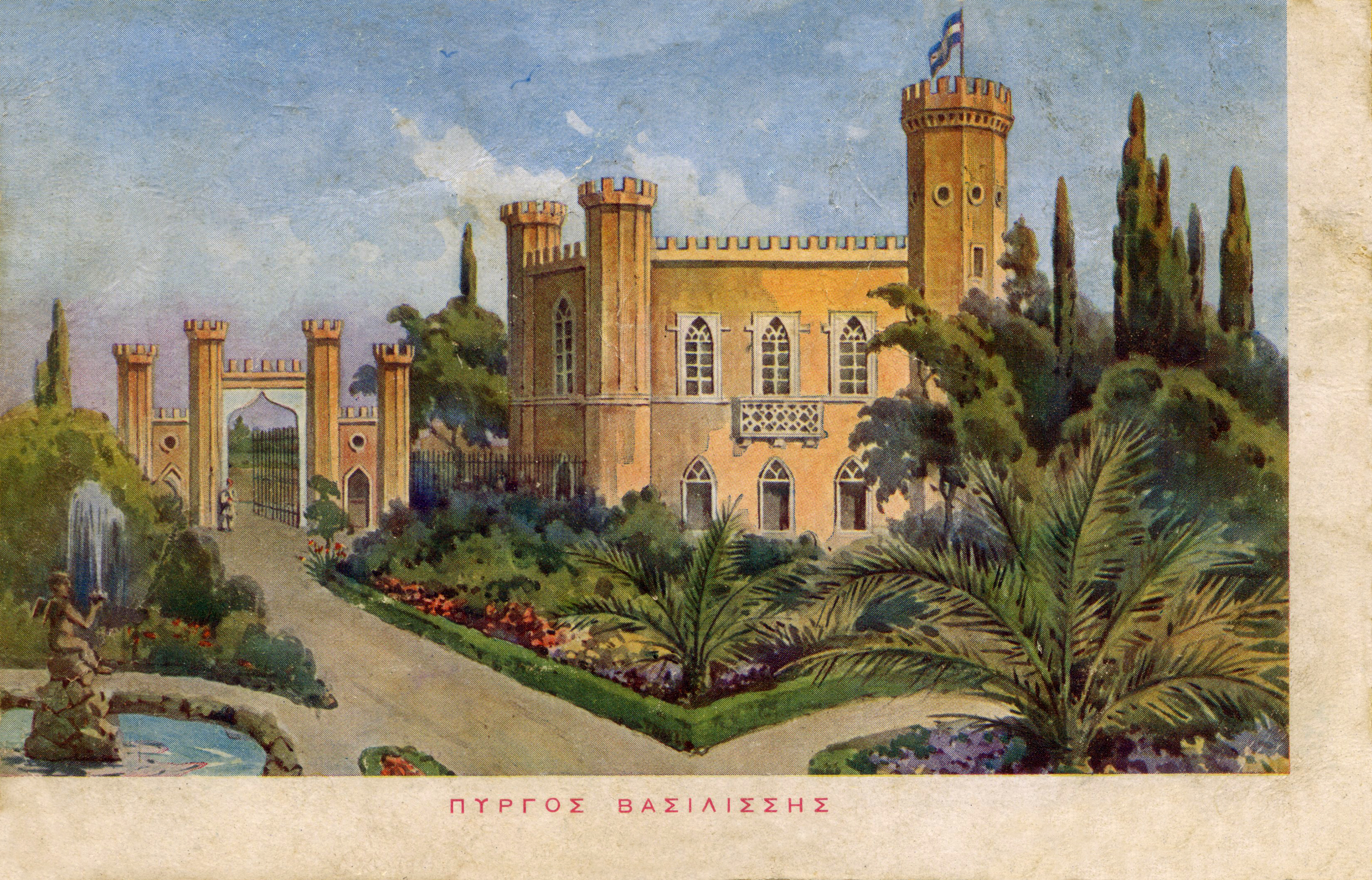
The tower, in c. 1910, painting by Giallinas.

Queen's Tower (Greek: Πύργος Βασιλίσσης, Pyrgos Vasilissis) is a former royal estate near Athens, Greece. The estate, consisting of 200 hectares (494 acres), was purchased by King Otto, the first king of modern Greece. He built there a small neogothic castle for his wife, Queen Amalia. The architecture resembles Hohenschwangau castle in Bavaria, built for Maximilian II of Bavaria, the brother of King Otto. As the castle is only one tower, it is called the Queen's Tower. After the abdication of King Otto, the estate was sold to the Serpieri family, who still own it. They have a dairy farm and wineyard on the estate. The wines bottled on the estate are called "Tour la Reine" (French for Queen's Tower).

A nearby station of the Proastiakos suburban railway opened in 2014, Pyrgos Vasilissis, is named after the estate.

== Bibliography ==
- Kardamitsi-Adami, Maro (2009). Palaces in Greece. Melissa Books. ISBN 978-960-204-289-2.
