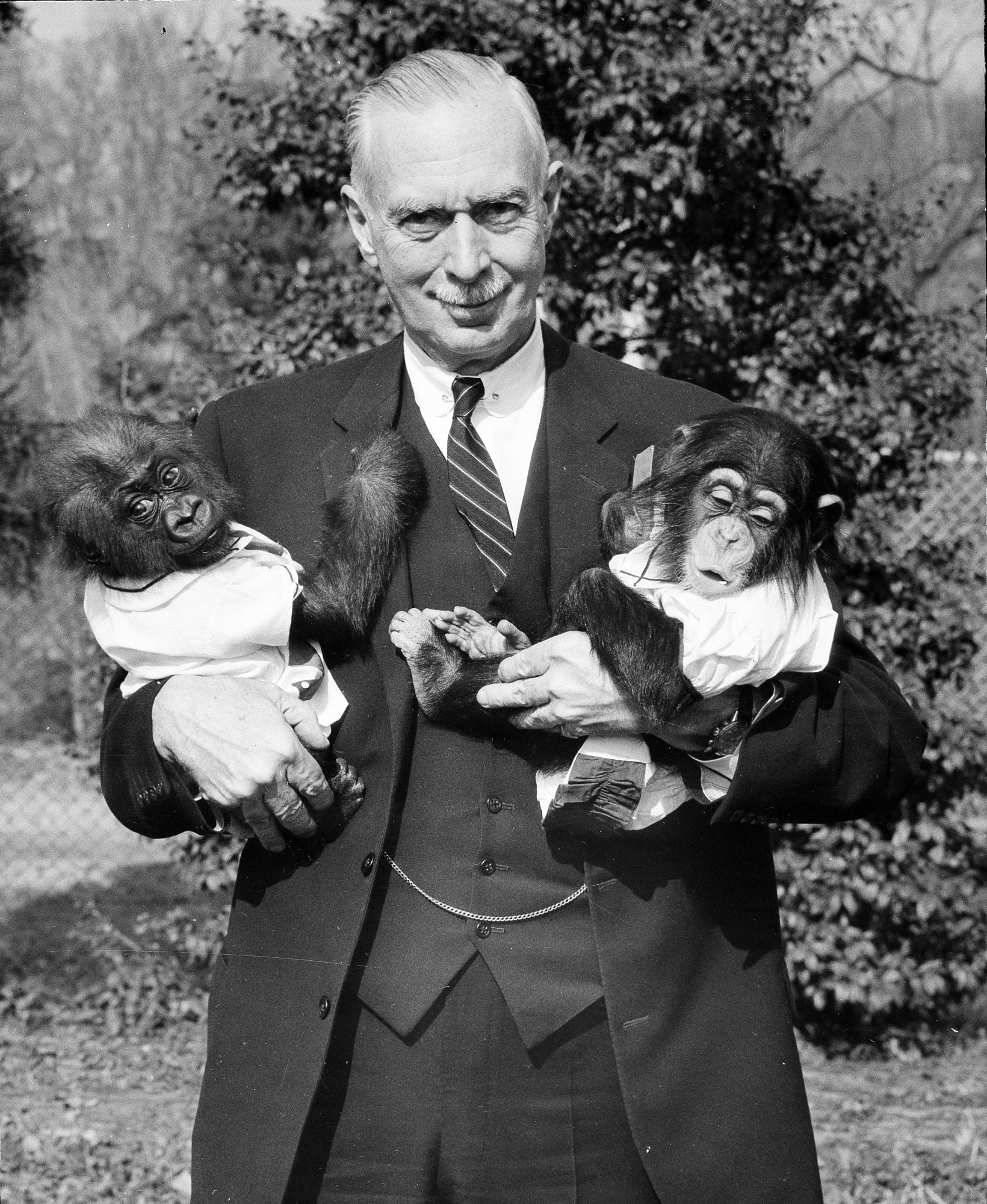
- Three hominines – an adult human male (Leonard Carmichael) holding a juvenile gorilla (left) and a juvenile chimpanzee (right). Each of these individuals represents one of the extant Hominine genera.

Scientific classification
- Kingdom: Animalia
- Phylum: Chordata
- Class: Mammalia
- Order: Primates
- Superfamily: Hominoidea
- Family: Hominidae
- Subfamily: Homininae; Gray, 1825

Type species
- Homo sapiens Linnaeus, 1758

Tribes
- †Dryopithecini (?); Gorillini; Hominini

= Homininae =

Homininae Temporal range: 12.5–0 Ma

Subfamily of mammals

The Homininae (/hɒmɪˈnaɪniː/; hominines) is a subfamily of the family Hominidae (hominids). The Homininae encompass humans, and are also called "African hominids" or "African apes". This subfamily includes two tribes, Hominini and Gorillini, both having extant species as well as extinct species.

Tribe Hominini includes: the extant genus Homo, which comprises only one extant species — modern human (Homo sapiens), and numerous extinct human species; and the extant genus Pan, which includes two extant species, chimpanzees and bonobos. Tribe Gorillini (gorillas) contains one extant genus, Gorilla, with two extant species, with variants, and one known extinct genus. Alternatively, the genus Pan is considered by some to belong, instead of to a subtribe Panina, to its own separate tribe, (so-called) "Panini," which would be a third tribe for Homininae.

Some classification schemes provide a more comprehensive account of extinct groups (see section "Taxonomic Classification" below). For example, tribe Hominini shows two subtribes: subtribe Hominina, which contains at least two extinct genera; and subtribe Panina, which presents only the extant genus, Pan (chimpanzees/bonobos), as fossils of extinct chimpanzees/bonobos are very rarely found.

The Homininae comprise all hominids that arose after the subfamily Ponginae (orangutans) split from the line of the great apes. The Homininae cladogram has three main branches leading to gorillas (via the tribe Gorillini), to humans, and to chimpanzees (via the tribe Hominini and subtribes Hominina and Panina, see graphic "Evolutionary tree" below). There are two living species each of Panina, chimpanzees and bonobos, and two living and one extinct species of gorillas. Traces of extinct Homo species, including Homo floresiensis, have been found with dates as recent as 40,000 years ago. Individual members of this subfamily are called hominine or hominines — not to be confused with the terms hominins or Hominini. (Note: A hominin is a member of the tribe Hominini, a hominine is a member of the subfamily Homininae, a hominid is a member of the family Hominidae, and a hominoid is a member of the superfamily Hominoidea.)

== History of discoveries and classification ==
Evolutionary tree of the superfamily Hominoidea, emphasizing the subfamily Homininae: after an initial separation from the main line (some 18 million years ago) of Hylobatidae (current gibbons), the line of subfamily Ponginae broke away—leading to the current orangutan; and later the Homininae split into the tribe Hominini (with subtribes Hominina and Panina), and the tribe Gorillini.

Until 1970, the family (and term) Hominidae meant humans only; the non-human great apes were assigned to the then-family Pongidae. Later discoveries led to revised classifications, with the great apes then united with humans (now in subfamily Homininae) as members of family Hominidae By 1990, it was recognized that gorillas and chimpanzees are more closely related to humans than they are to orangutans, leading to their (gorillas' and chimpanzees') placement in subfamily Homininae as well.

The subfamily Homininae can be further subdivided into three branches, the tribe Gorillini (gorillas), the tribe Hominini with subtribes Panina (chimpanzees/bonobos) and Hominina (humans and their extinct relatives), and the extinct tribe Dryopithecini. The Late Miocene fossil Nakalipithecus nakayamai, described in 2007, is a basal member of this clade, as is, perhaps, its contemporary Ouranopithecus; that is, they are not assignable to any of the three extant branches. Their existence suggests that the Homininae tribes diverged not earlier than about 8 million years ago (see Human evolutionary genetics).

Today, chimpanzees and gorillas live in tropical forests with acid soils that rarely preserve fossils. Although no fossil gorillas have been reported, four chimpanzee teeth about 500,000 years old have been discovered in the East-African rift valley (Kapthurin Formation, Kenya), where many fossils from the human lineage (hominins) have been found. This shows that some chimpanzees lived close to Homo (H. erectus or H. rhodesiensis) at the time; the same is likely true for gorillas.

== Taxonomic classification ==
Hominin timeline
← / Earlier apes; ← / Gorilla split; ← / Chimpanzee split; ← / Earliest bipedal; ← / Earliest sign of Ardipithecus; ← / Earliest sign of Australopithecus; ← / Earliest stone tools; ← / Earliest sign of Homo; ← / Dispersal beyond Africa; ← / Earliest fire / cooking; ← / Earliest rock art; ← / Earliest clothes; ← / Modern humans
(million years ago)

- Hominoidea (Apes)
  - Hylobatidae (Gibbons)
  - Hominidae (Great apes)
    - Ponginae
      - (Orangutans)
    - Homininae
      - Gorillini
        - (Gorilla)
      - Hominini
        - Panina
          - (chimpanzees)
        - - Hominina (Humans)

- Hominidae (Great apes)
  - Homininae (7)
    - - - Hominina
        - Pan
    - - Crown Gorillini
      - Chororapithecus (†)
  - Nakalipithecus (†10)
  - Dryopithecini (†)

Homininae

- Tribe Dryopithecini† (?)
  - Kenyapithecus (?)
    - Kenyapitheus wickeri
  - Ouranopithecus
    - Ouranopithecus macedoniensis
  - Otavipithecus
    - Otavipithecus namibiensis
  - Oreopithecus (?)
    - Oreopithecus bambolii
  - Nakalipithecus
    - Nakalipithecus nakayamai
  - Anoiapithecus
    - Anoiapithecus brevirostris
  - Dryopithecus
    - Dryopithecus fontani
  - Hispanopithecus (?)
    - Hispanopithecus laietanus
    - Hispanopithecus crusafonti
  - Pierolapithecus
    - Pierolapithecus catalaunicus
  - Rudapithecus (?)
    - Rudapithecus hungaricus
  - Samburupithecus
    - Samburupithecus kiptalami
  - Danuvius
    - Danuvius guggenmosi
- Tribe Gorillini
  - Chororapithecus †
    - Chororapithecus abyssinicus
  - Genus Gorilla
    - Western gorilla, Gorilla gorilla
      - Western lowland gorilla, Gorilla gorilla gorilla
      - Cross River gorilla, Gorilla gorilla diehli
    - Eastern gorilla, Gorilla beringei
      - Mountain gorilla, Gorilla beringei beringei
      - Eastern lowland gorilla, Gorilla beringei graueri
- Tribe Hominini
  - Subtribe Panina
    - Genus Pan
      - Chimpanzee (common chimpanzee), Pan troglodytes
        - Central chimpanzee, Pan troglodytes troglodytes
        - Western chimpanzee, Pan troglodytes verus
        - Nigeria-Cameroon chimpanzee, Pan troglodytes ellioti
        - Eastern chimpanzee, Pan troglodytes schweinfurthii
      - Bonobo (pygmy chimpanzee), Pan paniscus
  - Subtribe Hominina
    - Sahelanthropus (?)†
      - Sahelanthropus tchadensis
    - Orrorin†
      - Orrorin tugenensis
      - Orrorin praegens
    - Ardipithecus†
      - Ardipithecus ramidus
      - Ardipithecus kadabba
    - Kenyanthropus†
      - Kenyanthropus platyops
    - Australopithecus†
      - Australopithecus bahrelghazali
      - Australopithecus anamensis
      - Australopithecus afarensis
      - Australopithecus africanus
      - Australopithecus garhi
      - Australopithecus sediba
    - Paranthropus†
      - Paranthropus aethiopicus
      - Paranthropus robustus
      - Paranthropus boisei
    - Homo – immediate ancestors of modern humans
      - Homo gautengensis† (probable H. habilis specimens)
      - Homo rudolfensis†
      - Homo habilis†
      - Homo floresiensis†
      - Homo erectus†
      - Homo ergaster†
      - Homo antecessor†
      - Homo heidelbergensis†
      - Homo cepranensis† (probable early H. sapiens specimens)
      - Homo longi†
      - Homo neanderthalensis†
      - Homo rhodesiensis† (probable late H. heidelbergensis specimens)
      - Homo sapiens
        - Anatomically modern human, Homo sapiens sapiens
          - Archaic Homo sapiens (Cro-Magnon)†
          - Red Deer Cave people† (scientific name has not yet been assigned)
        - Homo sapiens idaltu† (classification not widely accepted)

== Evolution ==
The age of the subfamily Homininae (of the Homininae–Ponginae last common ancestor) is estimated at some 14 to 12.5 million years (Sivapithecus). Its separation into Gorillini and Hominini (the "gorilla–human last common ancestor", GHLCA) is estimated to have occurred at about 8 to 10 million years ago (T_{GHLCA}) during the late Miocene, close to the age of Nakalipithecus nakayamai.

There is evidence there was interbreeding of Gorillas and the Pan–Homo ancestors until right up to the Pan–Homo split.

=== Evolution of bipedalism ===
Recent studies of Ardipithecus ramidus (4.4 million years old) and Orrorin tugenensis (6 million years old) suggest some degree of bipedalism. Australopithecus and early Paranthropus may have been bipedal. Very early hominins such as Ardipithecus ramidus may have possessed an arboreal type of bipedalism.

The evolution of bipedalism encouraged multiple changes among hominins especially when it came to bipedalism in humans as they were now able to do many other things as they began to walk with their feet. These changes included the ability to now use their hands to create tools or carry things with their hands, the ability to travel longer distances at a faster speed, and the ability to hunt for food. According to researchers, humans were able to be bipedalists due to Darwin's Principle of natural selection. Darwin himself believed that larger brains in humans made an upright gait necessary, but had no hypothesis for how the mechanism evolved.

The first major theory attempting to directly explanation the origins of bipedalism was the Savannah hypothesis (Dart 1925.) This theory hypothesized that hominins became bipedalists due to the environment of the Savanna such as the tall grass and dry climate. This was later proven to be incorrect due to fossil records that showed that hominins were still climbing trees during this era.

Anthropologist Owen Lovejoy has suggested that bipedalism was a result of sexual dimorphism in efforts to help with the collecting of food. In his Male Provisioning Hypothesis introduced in 1981, lowered birth rates in early hominids increased pressure on males to provide for females and offspring. While females groomed and cared for their children with the family group, males ranged to seek food and returned bipadally with full arms. Males who could better provide for females in this model were more likely to mate and produce offspring.

Anthropologist Yohannes Haile-Selassie, an expert on Australopithecus anamensis, discusses the evidence that Australopithecus were one of the first hominins to evolve into obligate bipedalists. The remains of this subfamily are very important in the field of research as it presents possible information regarding how these primates adapted from tree life to terrestrial life. This was a huge adaptation as it encouraged many evolutionary changes within hominins including the ability to use their hand to make tools and gather food, as well as a larger brain development due to their change in diet.

=== Brain size evolution ===
There has been a gradual increase in brain volume (brain size) as the ancestors of modern humans progressed along the timeline of human evolution, starting from about 600 cm^{3} in Homo habilis up to 1500 cm^{3} in Homo neanderthalensis. However, modern Homo sapiens have a brain volume slightly smaller (1250 cm^{3}) than Neanderthals, women have a brain slightly smaller than men and the Flores hominids (Homo floresiensis), nicknamed hobbits, had a cranial capacity of about 380 cm^{3} (considered small for a chimpanzee), about a third of the Homo erectus average. It is proposed that they evolved from H. erectus as a case of insular dwarfism. In spite of their smaller brain, there is evidence that H. floresiensis used fire and made stone tools at least as sophisticated as those of their proposed ancestors H. erectus. In this case, it seems that for intelligence, the structure of the brain is more important than its size.

The current size of the human brain is a big distinguishing factor that separates humans from other primates. Recent examination of the human brain shows that the brain of a human is about more than four times the size of great apes and 20 times larger than the brain size of old world monkeys. A study was conducted to help determine the evolution of the brain size within the sub family Homininae that tested the genes ASPM (abnormal spindle-like microcephaly associated) and MCHP1 (microcephalin-1) and their association with the human brain. In this study researchers discovered that the increase in brain size is correlated to the increase of both ASP and MCPH1. MCPH1 is very polymorphic in humans compared to gibbons, Old World monkeys. This gene helps encouragegrowth of the brain. Further research indicated that the MCPH1 gene in humans could have also been an encouraging factor of population expansion. Other researchers have included that the diet was an encouraging factor to brain size as protein intake increased this helped brain development.

=== Evolution of family structure and sexuality ===
Sexuality is related to family structure and partly shapes it. The involvement of fathers in education is quite unique to humans, at least when compared to other Homininae. Concealed ovulation and menopause in females also occur in a few other primates, but are uncommon in other species. Testis and penis size seem to be related to family structure: monogamy or promiscuity, or harem, in humans, chimpanzees or gorillas, respectively. The levels of sexual dimorphism are generally seen as a marker of sexual selection. Studies have suggested that the earliest hominins were dimorphic and that this lessened over the course of the evolution of the genus Homo, correlating with humans becoming more monogamous, whereas gorillas, who live in harems, show a large degree of sexual dimorphism. Concealed (or "hidden") ovulation means that the phase of fertility is not detectable in women, whereas chimpanzees advertise ovulation via an obvious swelling of the genitals. Females can be partly aware of their ovulation along with their menstrual phases, but men are essentially unable to detect ovulation in women. Most primates have semi-concealed ovulation. Thus, one can think that the common ancestor had semi-concealed ovulation, which was inherited by gorillas, and that later evolved in concealed ovulation in humans and advertised ovulation in chimpanzees. Menopause also occurs in rhesus monkeys, and possibly in chimpanzees, but does not in gorillas and is quite uncommon in other primates (and other mammal groups).

== See also ==
- Chimpanzee–human last common ancestor
- Gorilla–human last common ancestor
- Orangutan–human last common ancestor
- Gibbon–human last common ancestor
- List of human evolution fossils
