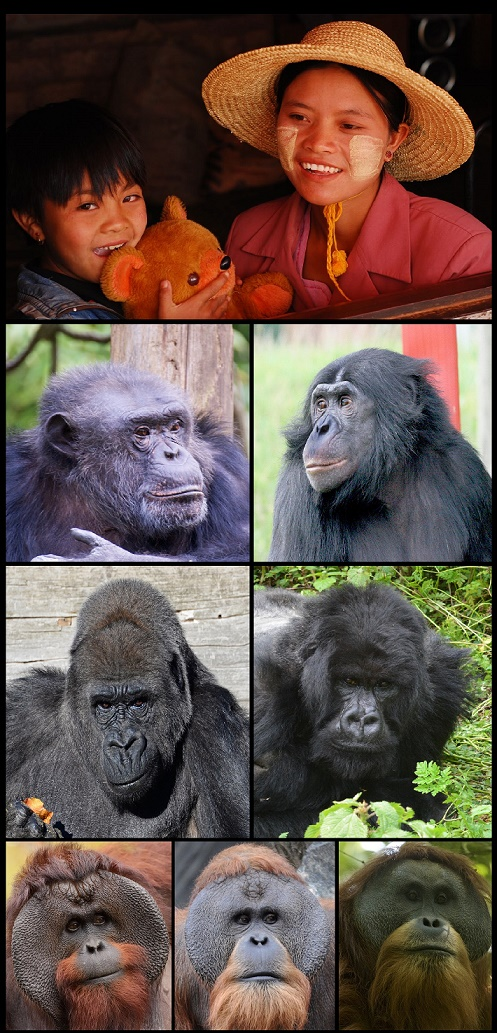
- The eight extant hominid species, one row per genus (humans, chimpanzees, gorillas, orangutans)

Scientific classification
- Kingdom: Animalia
- Phylum: Chordata
- Class: Mammalia
- Order: Primates
- Parvorder: Catarrhini
- Superfamily: Hominoidea
- Family: Hominidae; Gray, 1825

Type genus
- Homo Linnaeus, 1758

Subfamilies
- Ponginae; Homininae
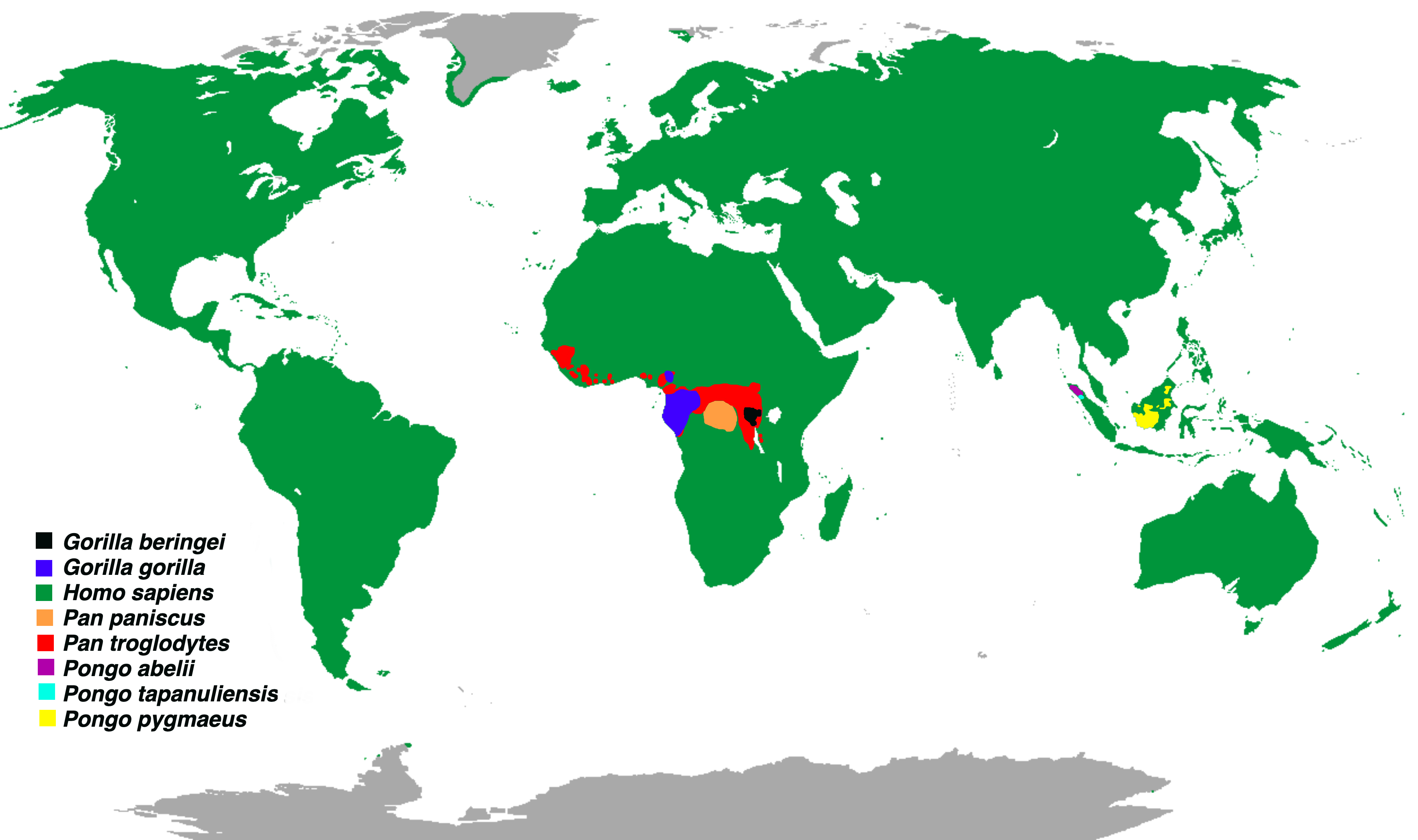
- Distribution of great ape species

Synonyms
- Pongidae Elliot, 1913; Gorillidae Frechkop, 1943; Panidae Ciochon, 1983

= Hominidae =

Hominidae Temporal range: Miocene–present, 17–0 Ma

Family of primates

The Hominidae (/hɒˈmɪnɪdiː/; hominids /ˈhɒmɪnɪdz/), whose members are known as the great apes, (Note: "Great ape" is a common name rather than a taxonomic label, and there are differences in usage, even by the same author. The term may or may not include humans, as when Dawkins writes "Long before people thought in terms of evolution ... great apes were often confused with humans" and "gibbons are faithfully monogamous, unlike the great apes which are our closer relatives.") are a taxonomic family of primates that includes eight extant species in four genera: Pongo (the Bornean, Sumatran and Tapanuli orangutan); Gorilla (the eastern and western gorilla); Pan (the chimpanzee and the bonobo); and Homo, of which only modern humans (Homo sapiens) remain.

Numerous revisions in classifying the great apes have caused the use of the term hominid to change over time. The original meaning of "hominid" referred only to humans (Homo) and their closest extinct relatives. However, by the 1990s humans and other apes were considered to be "hominids".

The earlier restrictive meaning has now been largely assumed by the term hominin, which however additionally includes Pan. Hominins more closely related to humans than to Pan are called Hominina, while the current meaning of "hominid" includes all the great apes including humans. Usage still varies, however, and some scientists and laypersons still use "hominid" in the original restrictive sense; the scholarly literature generally shows the traditional usage until the turn of the 21st century.

Within the taxon Hominidae, a number of extant and extinct genera are grouped with the humans, chimpanzees, and gorillas in the subfamily Homininae; others with orangutans in the subfamily Ponginae (see classification graphic below). The most recent common ancestor of all Hominidae lived roughly 14 million years ago, when the ancestors of the orangutans speciated from the ancestral line of the other three genera. Those ancestors of the family Hominidae had already speciated from the family Hylobatidae (the gibbons), perhaps 15 to 20 million years ago.

Due to the close genetic relationship between humans and the other great apes, certain animal rights organizations, such as the Great Ape Project, argue that nonhuman great apes are persons and should be given basic human rights. Twenty-nine countries have instituted research bans to protect great apes from any kind of scientific testing.

== Evolution ==
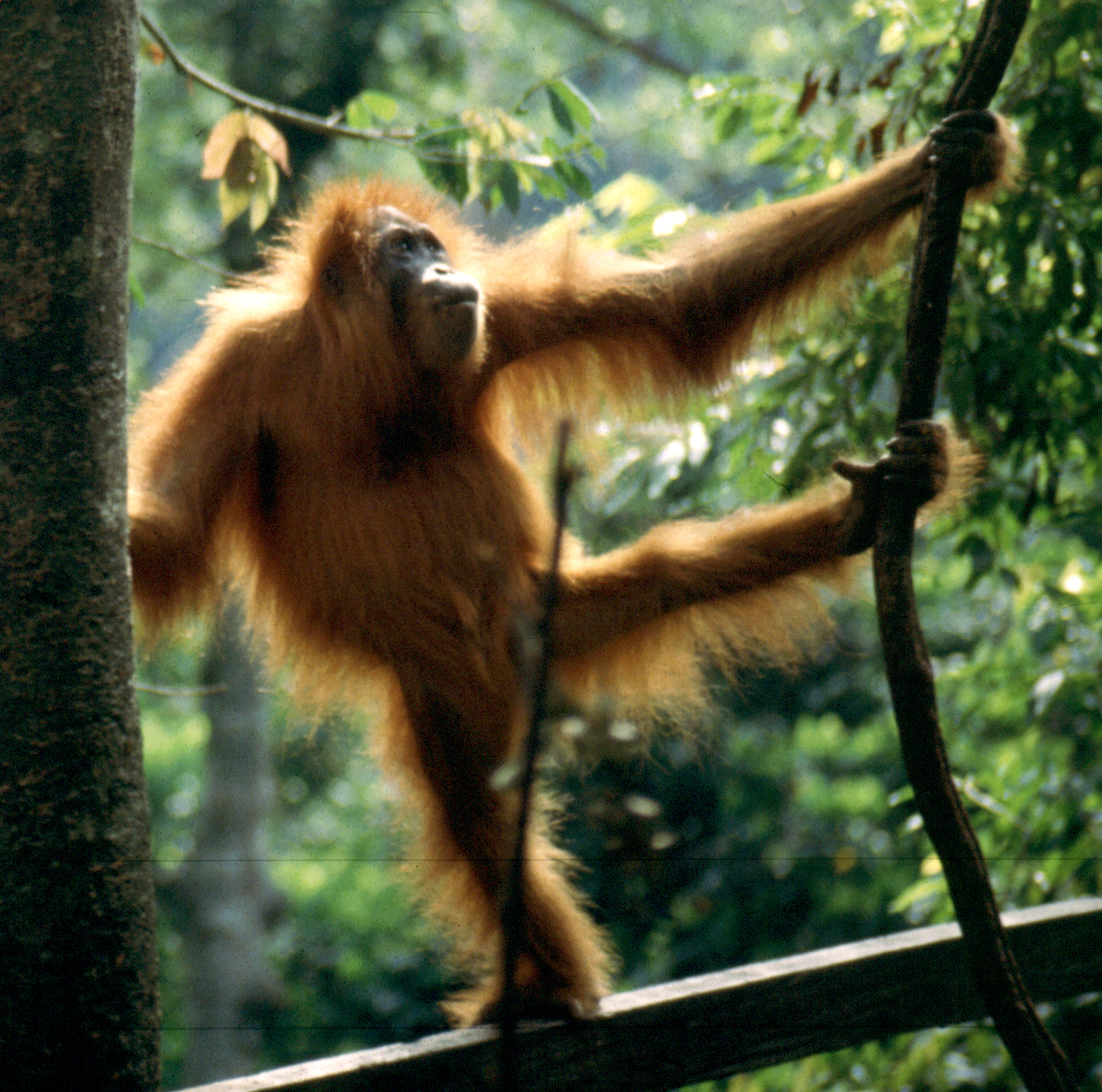
Sumatran orangutan (Pongo abelii)

In the early Miocene, about 22 million years ago, there were many species of tree-adapted primitive catarrhines from East Africa; the variety suggests a long history of prior diversification. Fossils from 20 million years ago include fragments attributed to Victoriapithecus, the earliest Old World monkey. Among the genera thought to be in the ape lineage leading up to 13 million years ago are Proconsul, Rangwapithecus, Dendropithecus, Limnopithecus, Nacholapithecus, Equatorius, Nyanzapithecus, Afropithecus, Heliopithecus, and Kenyapithecus, all from East Africa.

At sites far distant from East Africa, the presence of other generalized non-cercopithecids, that is, non-monkey catarrhines, of middle Miocene age—Otavipithecus from cave deposits in Namibia, and Pierolapithecus and Dryopithecus from France, Spain and Austria—is further evidence of a wide diversity of ancestral ape forms across Africa and the Mediterranean basin during the relatively warm and equable climatic regimes of the early and middle Miocene. The most recent of these far-flung Miocene apes (hominoids) is Oreopithecus, from the fossil-rich coal beds in northern Italy and dated to 9 million years ago.

Molecular evidence indicates that the lineage of gibbons (family Hylobatidae), the "lesser apes", diverged from that of the great apes some 18–12 million years ago, and that of orangutans (subfamily Ponginae) diverged from the other great apes at about 12 million years. There are no fossils that clearly document the ancestry of gibbons, which may have originated in a still-unknown South East Asian hominoid population; but fossil proto-orangutans, dated to around 10 million years ago, may be represented by Sivapithecus from India and Griphopithecus from Turkey. Species close to the last common ancestor of gorillas, chimpanzees and humans may be represented by Nakalipithecus fossils found in Kenya. Molecular evidence suggests that between 8 and 4 million years ago, first the gorillas (genus Gorilla), and then the chimpanzees (genus Pan) split off from the line leading to humans. Human DNA is approximately 98.4% identical to that of chimpanzees when comparing single nucleotide polymorphisms (see human evolutionary genetics). The fossil record, however, of gorillas and chimpanzees is limited; both poor preservation—rain forest soils tend to be acidic and dissolve bone—and sampling bias probably contribute most to this problem.

Other hominins probably adapted to the drier environments outside the African equatorial belt; and there they encountered antelope, hyenas, elephants and other forms becoming adapted to surviving in the East African savannas, particularly the regions of the Sahel and the Serengeti. The wet equatorial belt contracted after about 8 million years ago, and there is very little fossil evidence for the divergence of the hominin lineage from that of gorillas and chimpanzees—which split was thought to have occurred around that time. The earliest fossils argued by some to belong to the human lineage are Sahelanthropus tchadensis (7 Ma) and Orrorin tugenensis (6 Ma), followed by Ardipithecus (5.5–4.4 Ma), with species Ar. kadabba and Ar. ramidus.

== Taxonomy ==
=== Terminology ===
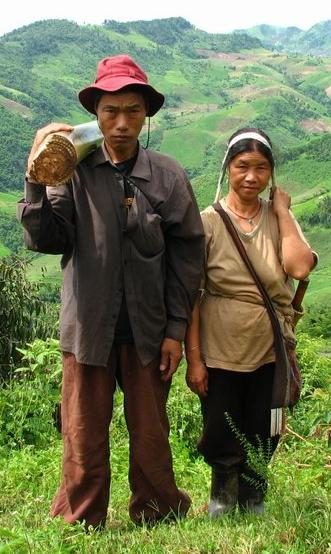
Humans are one of the four extant hominid genera.

The classification of the great apes has been revised several times in the last few decades; these revisions have led to a varied use of the word "hominid" over time. The original meaning of the term referred to only humans and their closest relatives—what is now the modern meaning of the term "hominin". The meaning of the taxon Hominidae changed gradually, leading to a modern usage of "hominid" that includes all the great apes including humans.

A number of very similar words apply to related classifications:

- A hominoid, sometimes called an ape, is a member of the superfamily Hominoidea: extant members are the gibbons (lesser apes, family Hylobatidae) and the hominids.
- A hominid is a member of the family Hominidae, the great apes: orangutans, gorillas, chimpanzees and humans.
- A hominine is a member of the subfamily Homininae: gorillas, chimpanzees, and humans (excludes orangutans).
- A hominin is a member of the tribe Hominini: chimpanzees and humans.
- A homininan, following a suggestion by Wood and Richmond (2000), would be a member of the subtribe Hominina of the tribe Hominini: that is, modern humans and their closest relatives, including Australopithecina, but excluding chimpanzees.
- A human is a member of the genus Homo, of which Homo sapiens is the only extant species, and within that Homo sapiens sapiens is the only surviving subspecies.

A cladogram indicating common names (cf. more detailed cladogram below):

- Hominoidea hominoids, apes
  - Hylobatidae
    gibbons
  - Hominidae hominids, great apes
    - Ponginae
      - Pongo orangutans
        - Pongo abelii
        - - Pongo tapanuliensis
          - Pongo pygmaeus
    - Homininae hominines
      - Gorillini
        - Gorilla gorillas
          - Gorilla gorilla
          - Gorilla beringei
      - Hominini hominins
        - Panina
          - Pan chimpanzees
            - Pan troglodytes
            - Pan paniscus
        - - Hominina homininans
            Homo sapiens
            humans

=== Extant and fossil relatives of humans ===
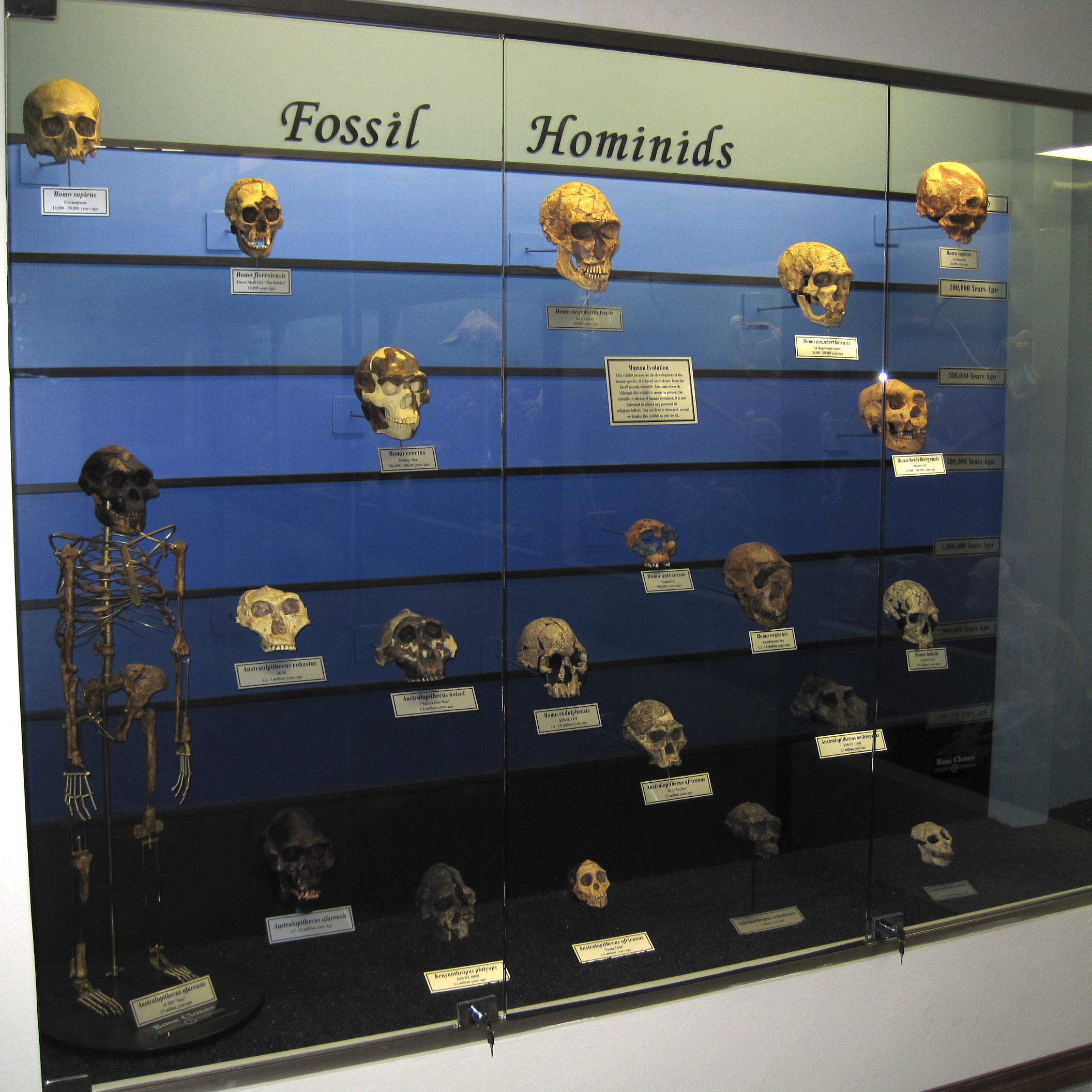
A fossil hominid exhibit at The Museum of Osteology, Oklahoma City, Oklahoma

Hominidae was originally the name given to the family of humans and their (extinct) close relatives, with the other great apes (that is, the orangutans, gorillas and chimpanzees) all being placed in a separate family, the Pongidae. However, that definition eventually made Pongidae paraphyletic because at least one great ape species (the chimpanzees) proved to be more closely related to humans than to other great apes. Most taxonomists today encourage monophyletic groups—this would require, in this case, the use of Pongidae to be restricted to just one closely related grouping. Thus, many biologists now assign Pongo (as the subfamily Ponginae) to the family Hominidae. The taxonomy shown here follows the monophyletic groupings according to the modern understanding of human and great ape relationships.

Humans and close relatives including the tribes Hominini and Gorillini form the subfamily Homininae (see classification graphic below). (A few researchers go so far as to refer the chimpanzees and the gorillas to the genus Homo along with humans.) But, those fossil relatives more closely related to humans than the chimpanzees represent the especially close members of the human family, and without necessarily assigning subfamily or tribal categories.

Many extinct hominids have been studied to help understand the relationship between modern humans and the other extant hominids. Some of the extinct members of this family include Gigantopithecus, Orrorin, Ardipithecus, Kenyanthropus, and the australopithecines Australopithecus and Paranthropus.

The exact criteria for membership in the tribe Hominini under the current understanding of human origins are not clear, but the taxon generally includes those species that share more than 97% of their DNA with the modern human genome, and exhibit a capacity for language or for simple cultures beyond their "local family" or band. The theory of mind concept—including such faculties as empathy, attribution of mental state, and even empathetic deception—is a controversial criterion; it distinguishes the adult human alone among the hominids. Humans acquire this capacity after about four years of age, whereas it has not been proven (nor has it been disproven) that gorillas or chimpanzees ever develop a theory of mind. This is also the case for some New World monkeys outside the family of great apes, as, for example, the capuchin monkeys.

However, even without the ability to test whether early members of the Hominini (such as Homo erectus, Homo neanderthalensis, or even the australopithecines) had a theory of mind, it is difficult to ignore similarities seen in their living cousins. Orangutans have shown the development of culture comparable to that of chimpanzees, and some say the orangutan may also satisfy those criteria for the theory of mind concept. These scientific debates take on political significance for advocates of great ape personhood.

== Description ==
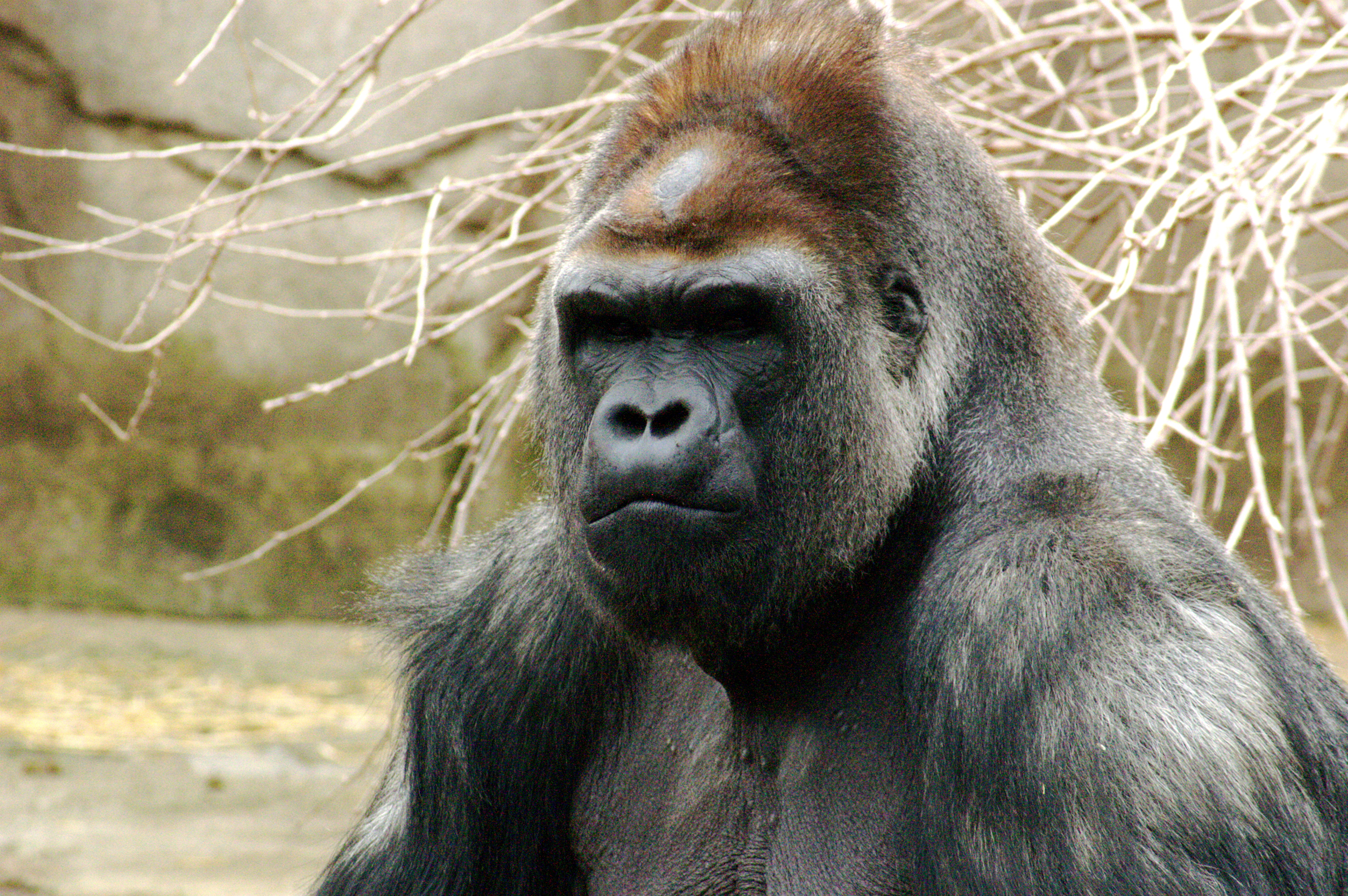
Gorilla

The great apes are tailless primates, with the smallest living species being the bonobo at 30 to 40 kilograms (66 to 88 lb) in weight, and the largest being the eastern gorillas, with males weighing 140 to 180 kilograms (310 to 400 lb). In all great apes, the males are, on average, larger and stronger than the females, although the degree of sexual dimorphism varies greatly among species. Hominid teeth are similar to those of the Old World monkeys and gibbons, although they are especially large in gorillas. The dental formula is 2.1.2.32.1.2.3. Human teeth and jaws are markedly smaller relative to body size compared to those of other apes. This may be an adaptation not only to the extensive use of tools, which has supplanted the role of jaws in hunting and fighting, but also to eating cooked food since the end of the Pleistocene.

== Behavior ==
Although most living species are predominantly quadrupedal, they are all able to use their hands for gathering food or nesting materials, and, in some cases, for tool use. They build complex sleeping platforms, also called nests, in trees to sleep in at night, but chimpanzees and gorillas also build terrestrial nests, and gorillas can also sleep on the bare ground.

All species are omnivorous, although chimpanzees and orangutans primarily eat fruit. When gorillas run short of fruit at certain times of the year or in certain regions, they resort to eating shoots and leaves, often of bamboo, a type of grass. Gorillas have extreme adaptations for chewing and digesting such low-quality forage, but they still prefer fruit when it is available, often going miles out of their way to find especially preferred fruits. Humans, since the Neolithic Revolution, have consumed mostly cereals and other starchy foods, including increasingly highly processed foods, as well as many other domesticated plants (including fruits) and meat.

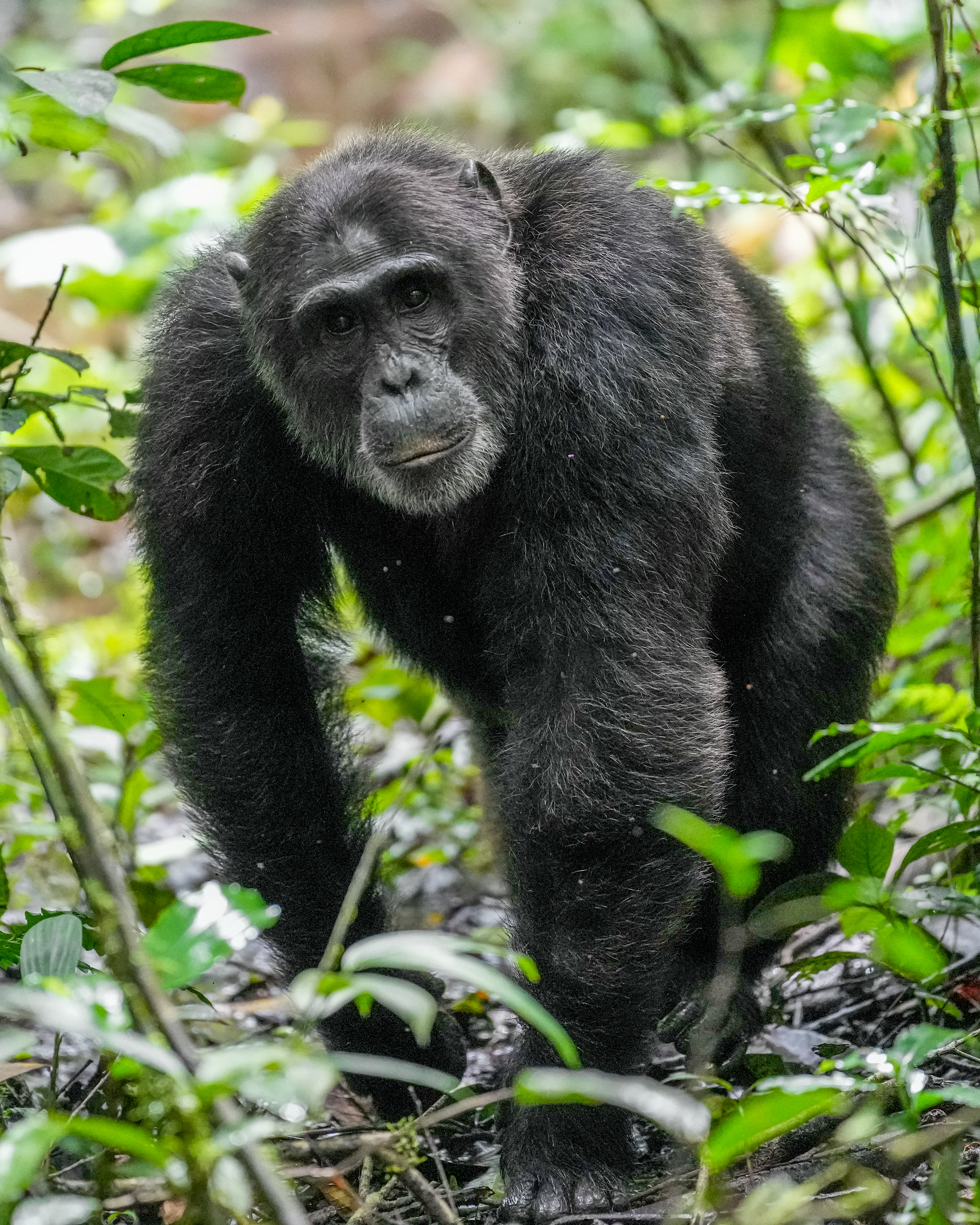
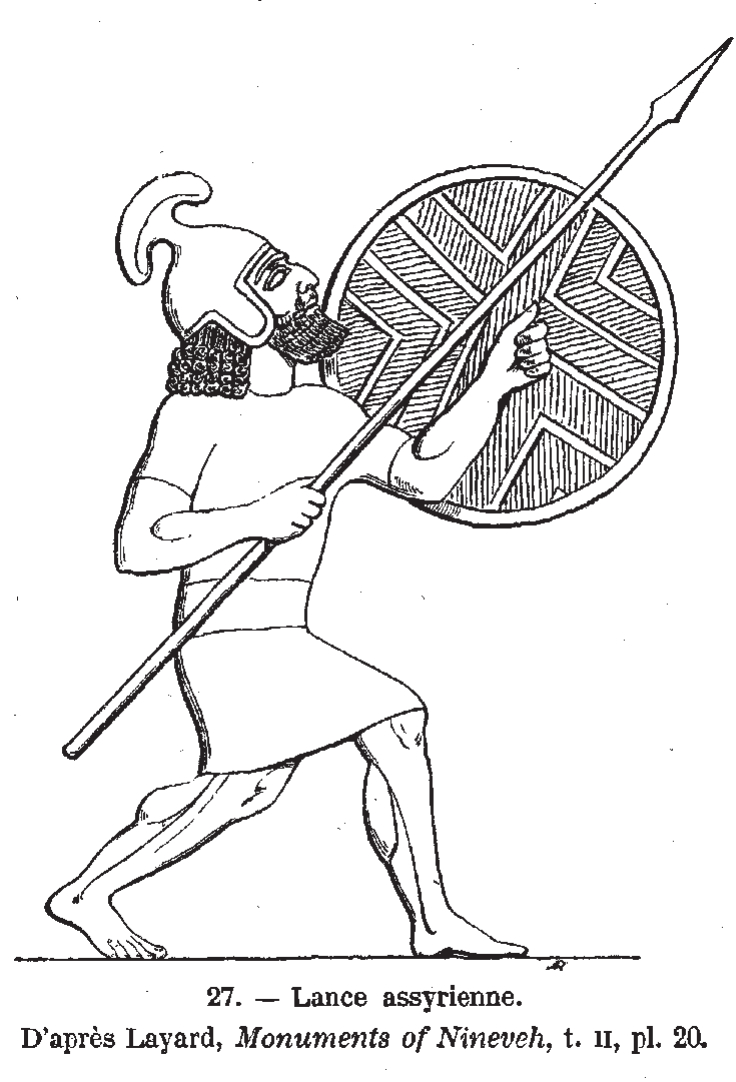
Both chimpanzees and humans engage in warfare over territory and resources.

Like humans, chimpanzees engage in coordinated warfare, patrolling territory and battling rivals for resources.

By contrast, bonobos are generally characterized by higher levels of social tolerance and cooperation, with conflicts frequently mitigated through affiliative behaviours.

Gestation in great apes lasts 8–9 months, and results in the birth of a single offspring, or, rarely, twins. The young are born helpless, and require care for long periods of time. Compared with most other mammals, great apes have a remarkably long adolescence, not being weaned for several years, and not becoming fully mature for eight to thirteen years in most species (longer in orangutans and humans). As a result, females typically give birth only once every few years. There is no distinct breeding season.

Gorillas and chimpanzees live in family groups of around five to ten individuals, although much larger groups are sometimes noted. Chimpanzees live in larger groups that break up into smaller groups when fruit becomes less available. When small groups of female chimpanzees go off in separate directions to forage for fruit, the dominant males can no longer control them and the females often mate with other subordinate males. In contrast, groups of gorillas stay together regardless of the availability of fruit. When fruit is hard to find, they resort to eating leaves and shoots.

This fact is related to gorillas' greater sexual dimorphism relative to that of chimpanzees; that is, the difference in size between male and female gorillas is much greater than that between male and female chimpanzees. This enables gorilla males to physically dominate female gorillas more easily. In both chimpanzees and gorillas, the groups include at least one dominant male, and young males leave the group at maturity.

== Legal status ==
Due to the close genetic relationship between humans and the other great apes, certain animal rights organizations, such as the Great Ape Project, argue that nonhuman great apes are persons and, per the Declaration on Great Apes, should be given basic human rights. In 1999, New Zealand was the first country to ban any great ape experimentation, and now 29 countries have currently instituted a research ban to protect great apes from any kind of scientific testing.

On 25 June 2008, the Spanish parliament supported a new law that would make "keeping apes for circuses, television commercials or filming" illegal. On 8 September 2010, the European Union banned the testing of great apes.

== Conservation ==
The following table lists the estimated number of great ape individuals living outside zoos.

Species	Estimated number	Conservation status	Refs
Bornean orangutan	104,700	Critically endangered	
Sumatran orangutan	6,667	Critically endangered	
Tapanuli orangutan	800	Critically endangered	
Western gorilla	200,000	Critically endangered	
Eastern gorilla	<5,000	Critically endangered	
Chimpanzee	200,000	Endangered	
Bonobo	10,000	Endangered	
Human	8,211,817,000	N/A	

== Phylogeny ==
Taxonomy of Hominoidea (emphasis on family Hominidae): After an initial separation from the main line by the Hylobatidae (gibbons) some 18 million years ago, the line of Ponginae broke away, leading to the orangutan; later, the Homininae split into the tribes Hominini (led to humans and chimpanzees) and Gorillini (led to gorillas).

Below is a cladogram with extinct genera. It is indicated approximately how many million years ago (Mya) the clades diverged into newer clades.

- Hominidae (18)
  - Ponginae (14)
    - Sivapithecus (†9mya)
    - Crown Ponginae
    - Ankarapithecus (†9)
    - Gigantopithecus (†0.1)
    - Khoratpithecus (†7)
  - (13)
    - (12)
      - Pierolapithecus (†11)
      - Hispanopithecus (†10)
    - - Lufengpithecus (†7)
      - Khoratpithecus (†9)
  - Homininae (13)
    - - Hominini (7)
        - - Ardipithecus (incl. Homo)
          - Pan
      - Gorillini
        - Crown Gorillini
        - Chororapithecus(†8)
    - Nakalipithecus (†10)
    - Samburupithecus (†9)

=== Extant ===
There are eight living species of great ape which are classified in four genera. The following classification is commonly accepted:

- Family Hominidae: humans and other great apes; extinct genera and species excluded
  - Subfamily Ponginae
    - Tribe Pongini
      - Genus Pongo
        - Bornean orangutan, Pongo pygmaeus
          - Northwest Bornean orangutan, Pongo pygmaeus pygmaeus
          - Northeast Bornean orangutan, Pongo pygmaeus morio
          - Central Bornean orangutan, Pongo pygmaeus wurmbii
        - Sumatran orangutan, Pongo abelii
        - Tapanuli orangutan, Pongo tapanuliensis
  - Subfamily Homininae
    - Tribe Gorillini
      - Genus Gorilla
        - Western gorilla, Gorilla gorilla
          - Western lowland gorilla, Gorilla gorilla gorilla
          - Cross River gorilla, Gorilla gorilla diehli
        - Eastern gorilla, Gorilla beringei
          - Mountain gorilla, Gorilla beringei beringei
          - Eastern lowland gorilla, Gorilla beringei graueri
    - Tribe Hominini
      - Subtribe Panina
        - Genus Pan
          - Chimpanzee, Pan troglodytes
            - Central chimpanzee, Pan troglodytes troglodytes
            - Western chimpanzee, Pan troglodytes verus
            - Nigeria-Cameroon chimpanzee, Pan troglodytes ellioti
            - Eastern chimpanzee, Pan troglodytes schweinfurthii
          - Bonobo, Pan paniscus
      - Subtribe Hominina
        - Genus Homo
          - Human, Homo sapiens
            - Anatomically modern human, Homo sapiens sapiens

=== Fossil ===
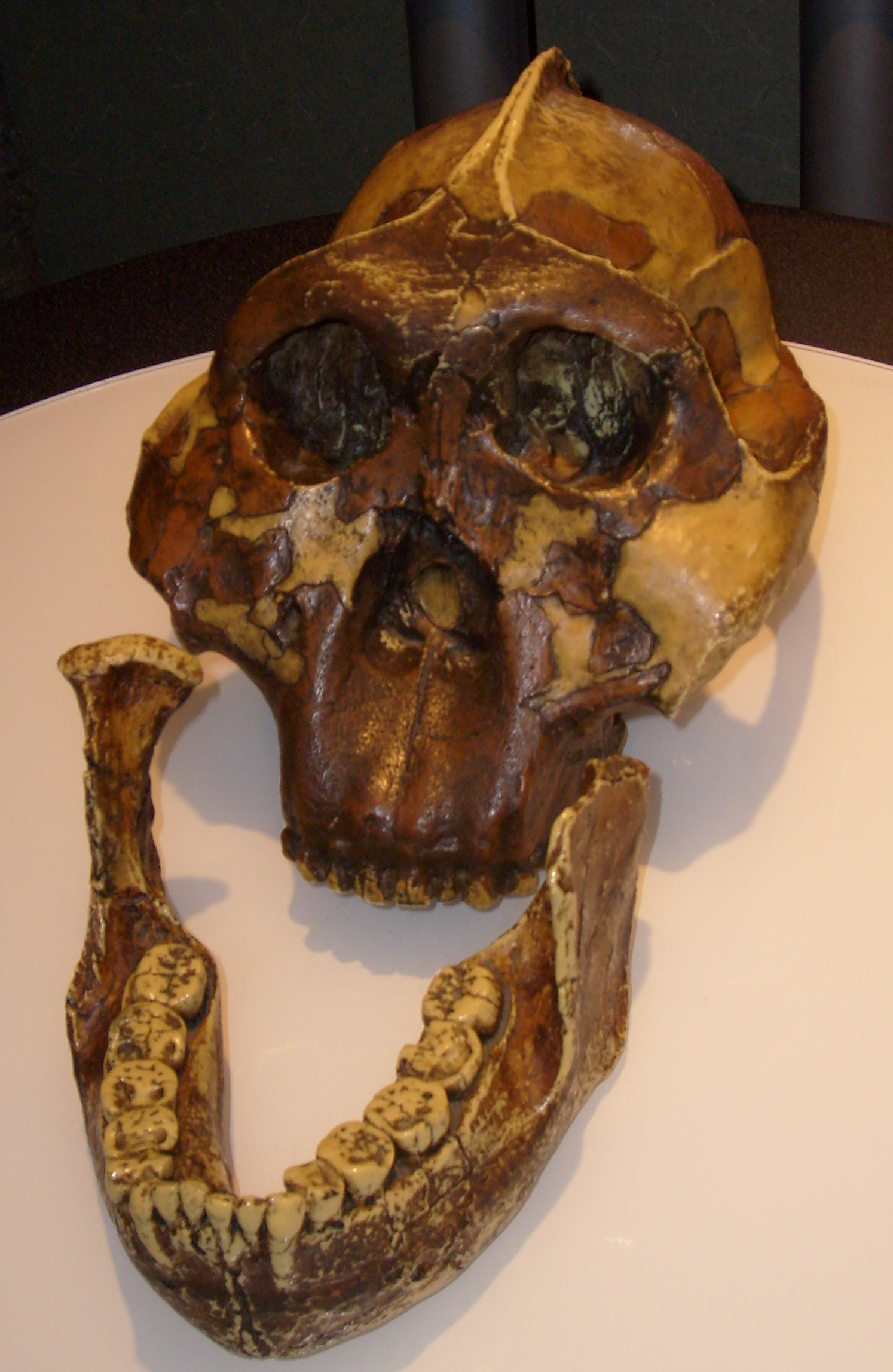
Replica of the skull sometimes known as "Nutcracker Man", found by Mary Leakey

In addition to the extant species and subspecies, archaeologists, paleontologists, and anthropologists have discovered and classified numerous extinct great ape species as below, based on the taxonomy shown.

Hominin timeline
← / Earlier apes; ← / Gorilla split; ← / Chimpanzee split; ← / Earliest bipedal; ← / Earliest sign of Ardipithecus; ← / Earliest sign of Australopithecus; ← / Earliest stone tools; ← / Earliest sign of Homo; ← / Dispersal beyond Africa; ← / Earliest fire / cooking; ← / Earliest rock art; ← / Earliest clothes; ← / Modern humans
(million years ago)

Family Hominidae

- Subfamily Ponginae
  - Tribe Lufengpithecini †
    - Lufengpithecus
      - Lufengpithecus lufengensis
      - Lufengpithecus keiyuanensis
      - Lufengpithecus hudienensis
    - Meganthropus
      - Meganthropus palaeojavanicus
  - Tribe Sivapithecini†
    - Ankarapithecus
      - Ankarapithecus meteai
    - Sivapithecus
      - Sivapithecus brevirostris
      - Sivapithecus punjabicus
      - Sivapithecus parvada
      - Sivapithecus sivalensis
      - Sivapithecus indicus
    - Gigantopithecus
      - Gigantopithecus bilaspurensis
      - Gigantopithecus blacki
      - Gigantopithecus giganteus
  - Tribe Pongini
    - Khoratpithecus†
      - Khoratpithecus ayeyarwadyensis
      - Khoratpithecus piriyai
      - Khoratpithecus chiangmuanensis
    - Pongo (orangutans)
      - Pongo hooijeri†
- Subfamily Homininae
  - Tribe Dryopithecini † (placement disputed)
    - Kenyapithecus (placement disputed)
      - Kenyapithecus wickeri
    - Danuvius
      - Danuvius guggenmosi
    - Pierolapithecus (placement disputed)
      - Pierolapithecus catalaunicus
    - Ouranopithecus
      - Ouranopithecus macedoniensis
    - Otavipithecus
      - Otavipithecus namibiensis
    - Morotopithecus (placement disputed)
      - Morotopithecus bishopi
    - Oreopithecus (placement disputed)
      - Oreopithecus bambolii
    - Nakalipithecus
      - Nakalipithecus nakayamai
    - Anoiapithecus
      - Anoiapithecus brevirostris
    - Hispanopithecus (placement disputed)
      - Hispanopithecus laietanus
      - Hispanopithecus crusafonti
    - Dryopithecus
      - Dryopithecus fontani
    - Rudapithecus (placement disputed)
      - Rudapithecus hungaricus
    - Samburupithecus
      - Samburupithecus kiptalami
    - Graecopithecus (placement disputed)
      - Graecopithecus freybergi
  - Tribe Gorillini
    - Chororapithecus † (placement debated)
      - Chororapithecus abyssinicus
  - Tribe Hominini
    - Subtribe Panina
    - Subtribe Hominina
      - Sahelanthropus†
        - Sahelanthropus tchadensis
      - Orrorin†
        - Orrorin tugenensis
        - Orrorin praegens
      - Ardipithecus†
        - Ardipithecus ramidus
        - Ardipithecus kadabba
      - Kenyanthropus†
        - Kenyanthropus platyops
      - Australopithecus†
        - Australopithecus bahrelghazali
        - Australopithecus anamensis
        - Australopithecus afarensis
        - Australopithecus africanus
        - Australopithecus garhi
        - Australopithecus sediba
        - Australopithecus deyiremeda
      - Paranthropus†
        - Paranthropus aethiopicus
        - Paranthropus robustus
        - Paranthropus boisei
      - Homo – close relatives of modern humans
        - Homo gautengensis† (probable H. habilis specimens)
        - Homo rudolfensis† (membership in Homo uncertain)
        - Homo habilis† (membership in Homo uncertain)
        - Homo naledi† (membership in Homo uncertain)
        - Dmanisi Man, Homo georgicus† (probable early subspecies of Homo erectus)
        - Homo ergaster† (African Homo erectus)
        - Homo erectus†
          - Homo erectus bilzingslebenensis †
          - Java Man, Homo erectus erectus †
          - Lantian Man, Homo erectus lantianensis †
          - Nanjing Man, Homo erectus nankinensis †
          - Peking Man, Homo erectus pekinensis †
          - Solo Man, Homo erectus soloensis † (possible separate species)
          - Tautavel Man, Homo erectus tautavelensis †
          - Yuanmou Man, Homo erectus yuanmouensis †
        - Flores Man or Hobbit, Homo floresiensis† (membership in Homo uncertain)
        - Homo luzonensis † (membership in Homo uncertain)
        - Homo antecessor†
        - Homo heidelbergensis†
        - Homo cepranensis† (probable H. heidelbergensis specimens)
        - Homo helmei† (probable early H. sapiens specimens)
        - Denisovans (scientific name not yet assigned, may include Penghu 1)†
        - Neanderthal, Homo neanderthalensis†
        - Homo rhodesiensis† (probable late H. heidelbergensis specimens)
        - Modern human, Homo sapiens (sometimes called Homo sapiens sapiens)
          - Homo sapiens idaltu†
          - Archaic Homo sapiens †

== See also ==
- Bili ape
- Dawn of Humanity (2015 PBS film)
- Great ape language
- Planet of the Apes franchise
- Great Ape Project
- Great ape research ban
- Great Apes Survival Partnership
- International Primate Day
- Kinshasa Declaration on Great Apes
- List of human evolution fossils
- List of individual apes
- Monkeys and apes in space
- Oldest hominids
- Prehistoric Autopsy (2012 BBC documentary)
- Primate cognition
- The Mind of an Ape
- Timeline of human evolution
