= Anoiapithecus =

Anoiapithecus Temporal range: 12 Ma Miocene

Scientific classification
- Kingdom: Animalia
- Phylum: Chordata
- Class: Mammalia
- Order: Primates
- Suborder: Haplorhini
- Infraorder: Simiiformes
- Family: Hominidae
- Subfamily: Homininae
- Tribe: †Dryopithecini
- Genus: †Anoiapithecus; Moyà-Solà et al., 2009
- Species: †A. brevirostris

Binomial name
- †Anoiapithecus brevirostris Moyà-Solà et al., 2009

Extinct genus of ape from the Miocene

Anoiapithecus is an extinct ape genus thought to be closely related to Dryopithecus. Both genera lived during the Miocene, approximately 12 million years ago. Fossil specimens named by Salvador Moyà-Solà are known from the deposits from Spain.

The discoverers described Anoiapithecus brevirostris as a hominoid (superfamily Hominoidea) in the dryopithecine tribe. They believe that it has more modern traits than the Kenyapithecines from which Kenyapithecus wickeri of Kenya brings fragmentary information. The African specimens are considered a sister taxon to the hominids, and specimens from Europe that are 2 million years younger must be from the time after these two groups split. This means that hominids may have evolved in Europe.

The name comes from the Anoia River region in Catalonia, where the fossil was found. It has been given the nickname Lluc since it is a male individual. The name Lluc is the Catalan form of Luke, which in Latin suggests "light", as this discovery enlighted early hominoid evolution.

The modern anatomical features that characterized the family Hominidae visible in Lluc's fossil among others are: unique facial pattern for hominoids, nasal aperture wide at the base, high cheek bone, and deep palate.

== Palaeoecology ==
Based on climatic changes recorded in the Abocador de Can Mata stratigraphic sequence in Spain, A. brevirostris appears to have had a habitat preference for dense, humid forests, in contrast to coeval pliopithecids that were more at home in relatively open environments.

== See also ==
- Chororapithecus – Extinct hominine genus from the Miocene
- Nakalipithecus – Extinct species of ape
- Pierolapithecus – Extinct species of ape from Miocene Europe
- Samburupithecus – Extinct genus of primate from Miocene Kenya
