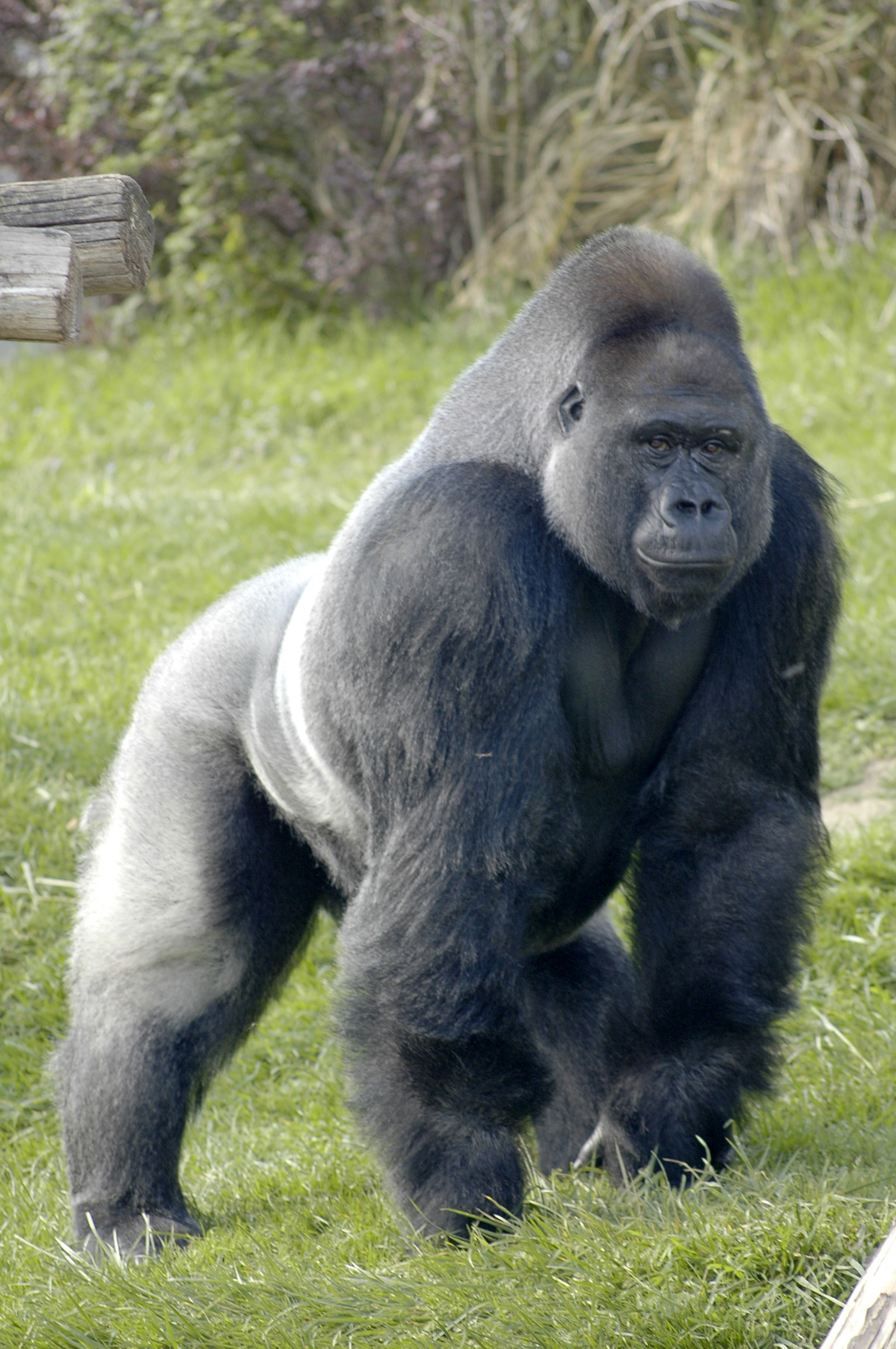
- Western gorilla (Gorilla gorilla)

Scientific classification
- Kingdom: Animalia
- Phylum: Chordata
- Class: Mammalia
- Infraclass: Placentalia
- Order: Primates
- Superfamily: Hominoidea
- Family: Hominidae
- Subfamily: Homininae
- Tribe: Gorillini; Hürzeler, 1968

Genera
- †Nakalipithecus; Gorilla; †Chororapithecus; sister: Hominini

= Gorillini =

Gorillini Temporal range: 8 Ma - present

Tribe of mammals

Gorillini is a taxonomic tribe containing three genera: Gorilla and the extinct Chororapithecus and (possibly) Nakalipithecus.
