= Chororapithecus =

Chororapithecus Temporal range: Tortonian, 8 Ma

Scientific classification
- Kingdom: Animalia
- Phylum: Chordata
- Class: Mammalia
- Infraclass: Placentalia
- Order: Primates
- Superfamily: Hominoidea
- Family: Hominidae
- Subfamily: Homininae
- Tribe: Gorillini
- Genus: †Chororapithecus; Suwa et al., 2007
- Species: †C. abyssinicus

Binomial name
- †Chororapithecus abyssinicus Suwa et al., 2007

Extinct hominine genus from the Miocene

Chororapithecus is an extinct great ape from the Afar region of Ethiopia roughly 8 million years ago during the Late Miocene, comprising one species, C. abyssinicus. It is known from nine isolated teeth discovered in a 2005–2007 survey of the Chorora Formation. The teeth are indistinguishable from those of gorillas in terms of absolute size and relative proportions, and it has been proposed to be an early member of Gorillini. However, this is controversial given the paucity of remains, and notable anatomical differences between Chororapithecus and gorilla teeth. The Kenyan ape Nakalipithecus has been proposed to be an ancestor of Chororapithecus or at least closely related. If correct, they would be the only identified fossil members of any modern non-human African great ape lineage, and would push the gorilla–human last common ancestor from 8 million years ago (identified by molecular analysis) to 10 million years ago. The teeth are adapted for processing tough plant fibres as well as hard, brittle food, and the formation is thought to represent a forested lakeside habitat.

Hominin timeline
← / Earlier apes; ← / Gorilla split; ← / Chimpanzee split; ← / Earliest bipedal; ← / Earliest sign of Ardipithecus; ← / Earliest sign of Australopithecus; ← / Earliest stone tools; ← / Earliest sign of Homo; ← / Dispersal beyond Africa; ← / Earliest fire / cooking; ← / Earliest rock art; ← / Earliest clothes; ← / Modern humans
(million years ago)

== Taxonomy ==
Chororapithecus teeth were discovered in the Afar region, Ethiopia, in a 2005–2007 survey in the Beticha locality of the Chorora Formation, hence the name, and the formation itself is named after the Chorora village about 8 km (5.0 mi) south of the locality. The specific name, abyssinicus, is in reference to Abyssinia, the former name of Ethiopia. The ape was described in 2007 by anthropologists Gen Suwa, Reiko Kono, Shigehiro Katoh, Berhane Asfaw, and Yonas Beyene.

Hominidae

- - Kenyapithecus
  - - Nakalipithecus (as a stem hominid)
    - Homininae
      - Gorillini
        - Nakalipithecus (as a stem gorilla)
        - - Chororapithecus
          - Gorillas
      - Hominini
        - - Chimpanzee
          - Bonobo
        - - Ardipithecus
          - - Australopithecus
            - Homo (humans)

Family tree showing Chororapithecus as a stem gorilla

The remains represent at least 3, perhaps over 6, different individuals. The holotype specimen, CHO-BT 4, is a right upper second molar, and the paratypes are a left lower canine, 3 right upper third molars, a left lower third molar, a left lower first molar, and a left and a right lower molar fragment, making for a total of 9 isolated teeth. The discoverers noted the teeth have some of the same adaptations for shearing food as those of gorillas, and classified it as the first fossil member and the only other genus of the tribe Gorillini. Because the Chororapithecus teeth have several specializations not shared with those of gorillas (they exhibit a derived condition compared to the presumed last common ancestor, LCA), they did not consider it as ancestral to the gorilla. However, the discovers also conceded it is possible that Chororapithecus and gorillas instead convergently evolved the same teeth due to a similar diet. If Chororapithecus is not a gorillin, it may be a stem hominine or not a hominine at all.

The teeth were originally dated to 10.5–10 million years ago (mya), and the discoverers then concluded that the gorilla–human LCA existed about 12 mya, but they were re-dated to about 8 mya. If Chororapithecus was indeed a stem gorilla, the latter date is more consistent with the timing of 8 mya for the LCA according to molecular data. Based on the revised date and similarly large premolar size, the 10 million year old Kenyan Nakalipithecus has been proposed to have been the ancestor to Chororapithecus, which would move the LCA to 10 mya if correct. Nonetheless, because there are so few remains known, its relations to modern great apes is unclear. It was the first extinct ape to have been proposed to be a member of the gorilla lineage.

It is debated if great apes evolved in Africa or Eurasia given the abundance of early fossil apes species in the latter and the paucity in the former, despite all modern great apes except the orangutan being known from Africa. The first Miocene African great ape was discovered in 1997, Samburupithecus, and the only others known are Nakalipithecus and Chororapithecus. If Chororapithecus is indeed an early gorilla, then it would point to an African origin for great apes. However, earlier Eurasian dryopithecines may be early hominines.

== Anatomy ==
The teeth, both in absolute size and relative proportions, are the same as in gorillas, and the molars range in size between the largest and smallest of what is normally seen in adult gorillas. Like in gorillas, the upper molars have a long protocone crest, and the lower molars have a correspondingly long trigonid crest, which increase shearing efficacy. Compared to gorillas, the cusp tips are relatively peripheral, are not well pronounced, and the enamel is thicker especially at the side cusps where the tooth borders other teeth. This causes a wide basin on the middle of the molar. This is reminiscent of the condition seen in Hominini (humans and chimpanzees). The upper molars are elongated and narrow, and also have a gorilla-like enamel-dentine juncture.

== Palaeobiology ==
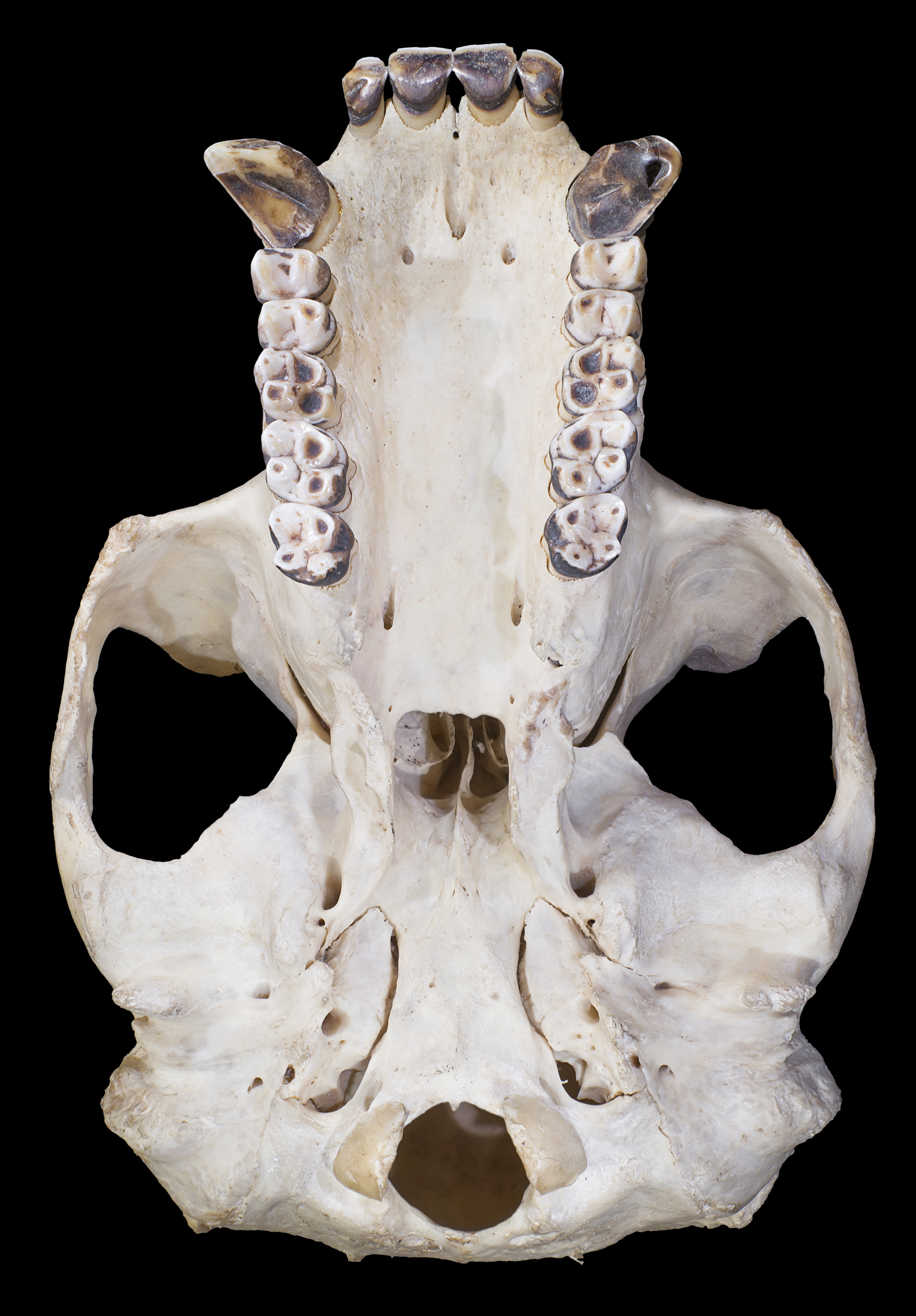
The molars of Chororapithecus have similarities to those of a gorilla (visible above)

The teeth exhibit adaptations for shearing, but the low cusp height indicates the teeth likely folded and pulverised tough plant fibres rather than cut through them as gorillas and other folivores with higher cusps do. The thick enamel is more similar to that of orangutans, and may indicate the consumption of hard, brittle foods. Orangutan molars are probably adapted for eating hard fruits and nuts. Chororapithecus and Oreopithecus are the only known folivorous Miocene apes.

The Chorora Formation represents a braided river system, possibly a forested area alongside a lake in a forest-savanna mosaic environment. It is the only sub-Saharan vertebrate-bearing formation spanning from 9–7.4 mya, and records the earliest known occurrences of cercopithecine monkeys, hippos, and rabbits in Africa. At the Beticha locality, the large vertebrate assemblage is: colobine and cercopithecine monkeys, a hippo, the pig Nyanzachoerus, the antelope-like siveratheriine and Palaeotragus, a bosalephine antelope, wild cattle, the horse Cormohipparion and an unidentified equine, a rhino, what may be the elephant Stegotetrabelodon, a percrocutid hyena, and a large cat. Because horses and rodents are much less common in the Beticha locality than the type locality of the formation, Beticha may have been a comparatively more forested and closed environment.

== See also ==
- Timeline of human evolution
- Afropithecus
- Anoiapithecus
- Danuvius
- Dryopithecus
- Graecopithecus
- Hispanopithecus
- Khoratpithecus
- Lufengpithecus
- Oreopithecus
- Pierolapithecus
- Sivapithecus
