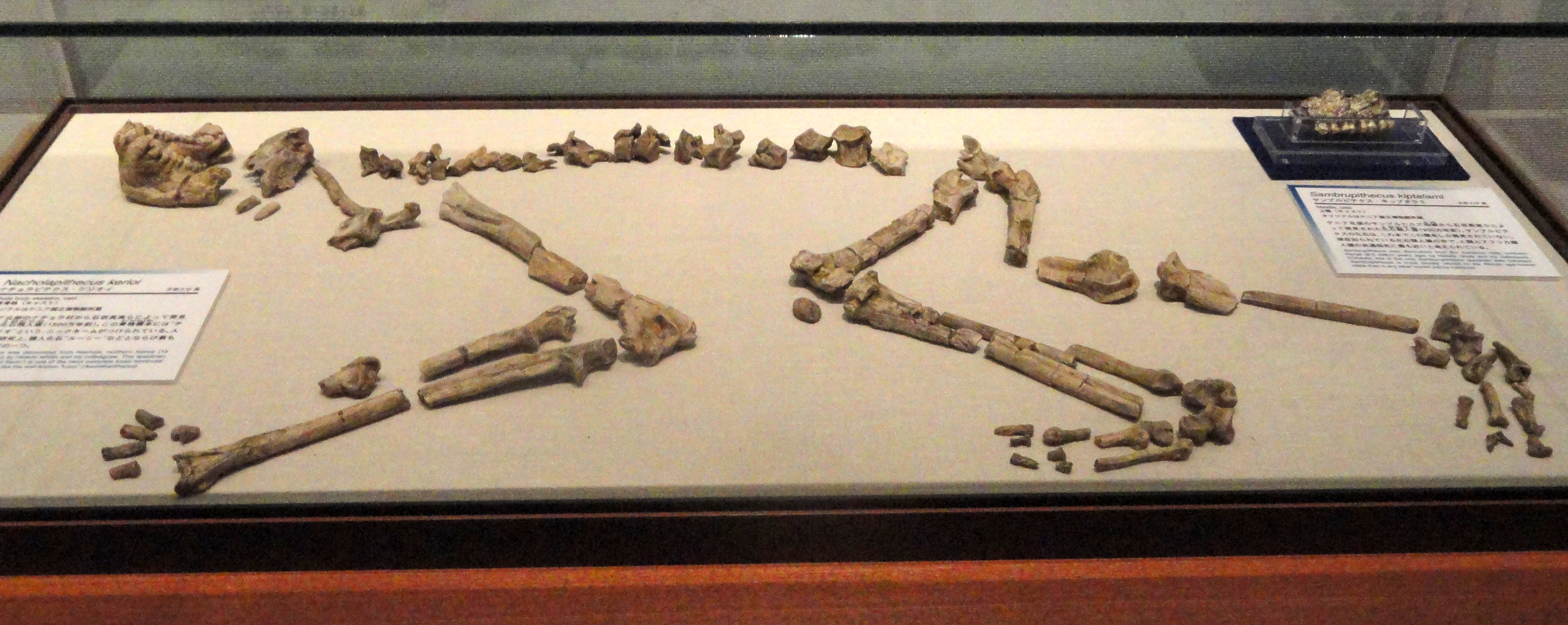
- Nacholapithecus kerioi at the Kyoto University Museum

Scientific classification
- Kingdom: Animalia
- Phylum: Chordata
- Class: Mammalia
- Order: Primates
- Suborder: Haplorhini
- Infraorder: Simiiformes
- Family: †Proconsulidae
- Genus: †Nacholapithecus; Ishida, Kunimatsu, Nakatsukasa & Nakano, 1999

Species
- †Nacholapithecus kerioi Ishida et al., 1999

= Nacholapithecus =

Nacholapithecus Temporal range: 15–14 Million years ago

Extinct genus of hominoids

Nacholapithecus kerioi was an ape that lived 15-14 million years ago during the Middle Miocene. Fossils have been found in the Nachola formation in northern Kenya. The only member of the genus Nacholapithecus, it is thought to be a key genus in early hominid evolution. Similar in body plan to Proconsul, it had a long vertebral column with six lumbar vertebrae, no tail, a narrow torso, large upper limbs with mobile shoulder joints, and long feet.

Together with other Kenyapithecinae such as Equatorius, Kenyapithecus, and Griphopithecus, Nacholapithecus displayed synapomorphies with Anoiapithecus.

== Taxonomy ==
Nacholapithecus was initially classified as belonging in Kenyapithecus, then attributed to Equatorius (with Equatorius perhaps grouped into a subfamily Equatorinae, instead of both species in Afropithecini), finally recognised by Ishida et al. (1999) as a separate genus. Classified perhaps as a member of the family Proconsulidae.

== Fossil finds ==
Nacholapithecus kerioi is known from the lowest part of the Aka Aiteputh Formation, one of five formations in the Neogene System in Nachola, Samburu District, northern Kenya. The formation is largely part of the north-western rift flank overlying the Nachola Formation.

== Palaeobiology ==
Morphological evidence suggests arboreal quadrupedalism was for N. kerioi the primary method of locomotion.
