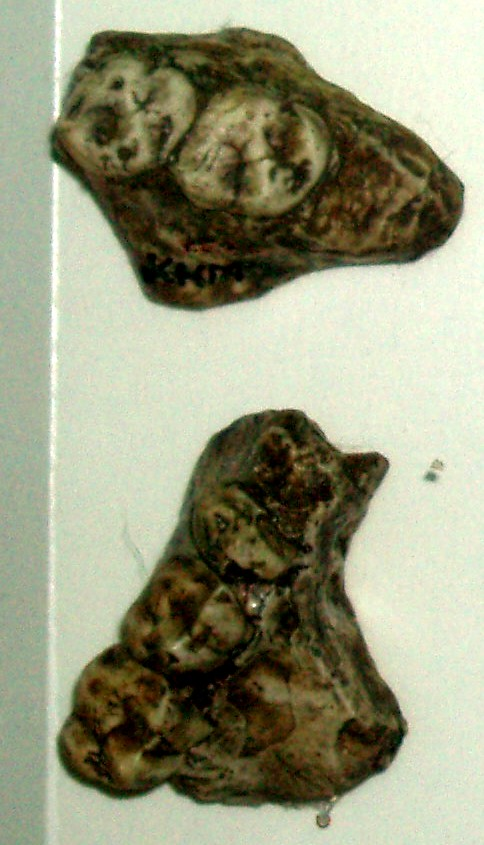
- Kenyapithecus wickeri teeth

Scientific classification
- Domain: Eukaryota
- Kingdom: Animalia
- Phylum: Chordata
- Class: Mammalia
- Order: Primates
- Suborder: Haplorhini
- Infraorder: Simiiformes
- Family: Hominidae
- Subfamily: Homininae
- Genus: †Kenyapithecus; Leakey, 1961
- Species: †K. wickeri

Binomial name
- †Kenyapithecus wickeri Leakey, 1961

= Kenyapithecus =

Kenyapithecus Temporal range: 14 Million years ago

Extinct genus of primates

Kenyapithecus wickeri is a fossil ape discovered by Louis Leakey in 1961 at a site called Fort Ternan in Kenya. The upper jaw and teeth were dated to 14 million years ago. One theory states that Kenyapithecus may be the common ancestor of all the great apes. More recent investigations suggest Kenyapithecus is more primitive than that and is only slightly more modern than Proconsul, which is considered to be an ape.

Evidence suggests that Kenyapithecus wickeri was one of the species that started a radiation of apes out of Africa.

== Morphology ==
Impressed by Kenyapithecus's modern-looking teeth, Leakey declared Kenyapithecus to be "a very early ancestor of man himself."

Kenyapithecus possessed craniodental adaptations for hard object feeding including thicker molar enamel, and a large mandible, large premolars and upper incisors that are similar to those seen in living pitheciine monkeys. Kenyapithecus also possessed macaque-like limbs adapted for a knuckle-walking mode of semi-terrestrial locomotion. This could show that as hominins evolved, they passed through a knuckle-walking phase.

Kenyapithecus wickeri has very distinct features, especially details in the canine teeth and is similar to modern apes.

== See also ==
- Chororapithecus
- Dryopithecus
- Nakalipithecus
- Pierolapithecus
- Samburupithecus
