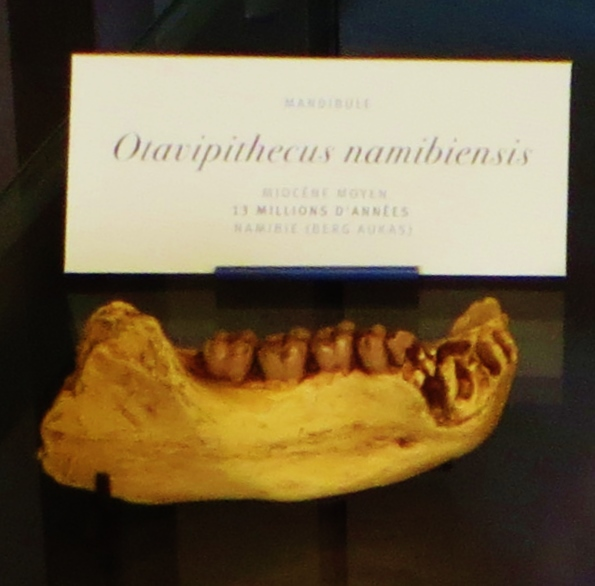
- Fossil jawbone of Otavipithecus namibiensis at the National Museum of Natural History, France

Scientific classification
- Domain: Eukaryota
- Kingdom: Animalia
- Phylum: Chordata
- Class: Mammalia
- Order: Primates
- Suborder: Haplorhini
- Infraorder: Simiiformes
- Family: Hominidae
- Subfamily: †Dryopithecinae
- Tribe: †Afropithecini
- Genus: †Otavipithecus; Conroy et al., 1992
- Species: †O. namibiensis

Binomial name
- †Otavipithecus namibiensis Conroy et al., 1992

= Otavipithecus =

Otavipithecus Temporal range: 13 Million years ago

Extinct species of ape

Otavipithecus namibiensis is an extinct species of ape from the Miocene of Namibia. The fossils were discovered at the Berg Aukas mines in the foothills of the Otavi mountains, hence the generic name. The species was described in 1992 by Glenn Conroy and colleagues, and was at the time the only non-hominin fossil ape known from Southern Africa. The scientists noted that the surrounding area of the discovered specimen included fauna dated at "about 13 ± 1 Myr". The fossils consist of part of the lower jawbone with molars, a partial frontal bone, a heavily damaged ulna, one vertebra and a partial finger bone.

Otavipithecus is estimated to have weighed between 14 and 20 kg. The unspecialised teeth have only a thin layer of enamel, implying a diet of soft vegetation such as fruit and young leaves.

The phylogenetic position of Otavipithecus is not clear from the meagre fossils known to date. Alternative proposals have it branching close to the earlier Afropithecus of Kenya, or being close to the common ancestor of modern African apes (humans, chimpanzees, and gorillas).
