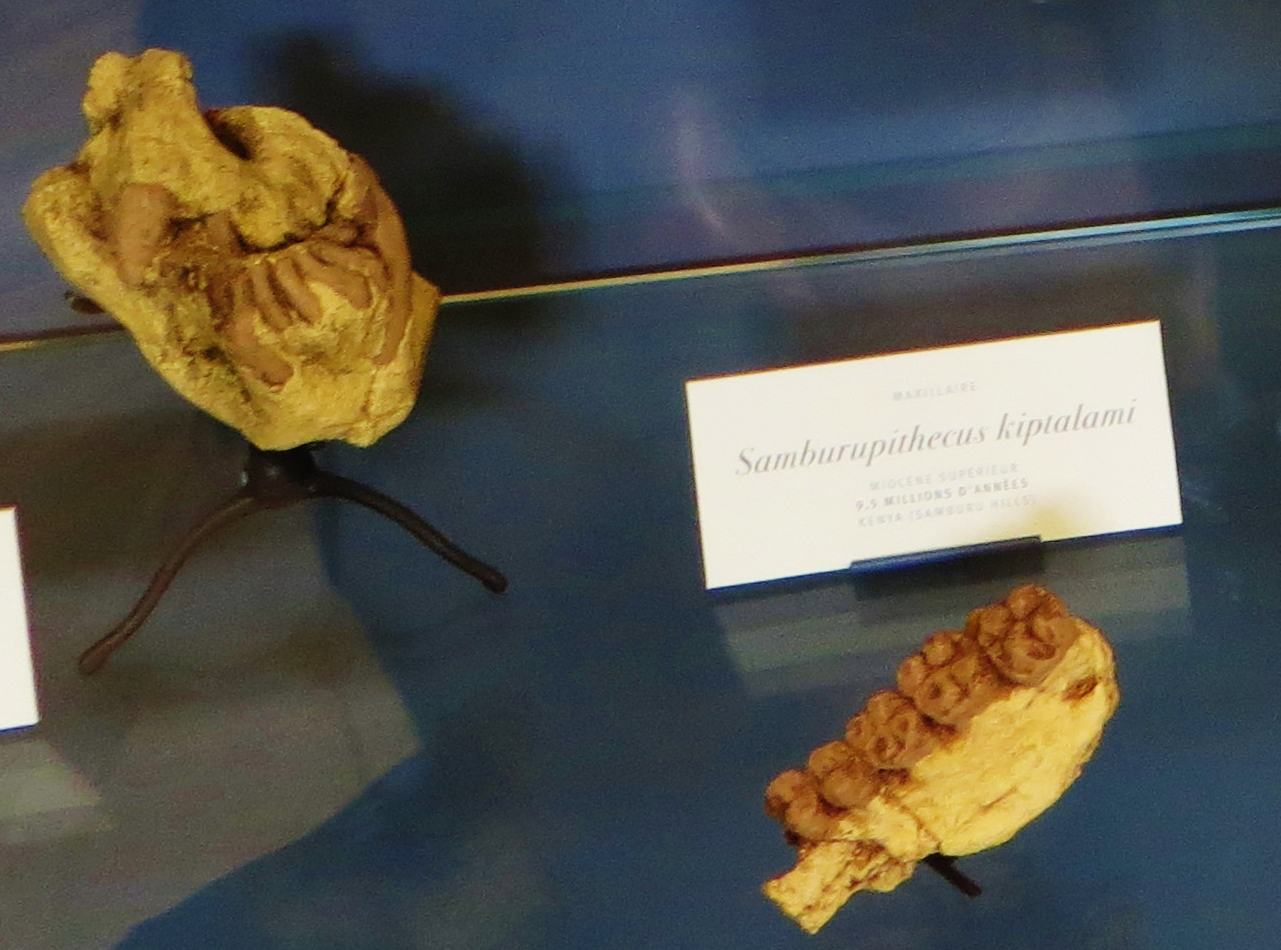
- Samburupithecus kiptalami fossils, Muséum national d'histoire naturelle, Paris

Scientific classification
- Kingdom: Animalia
- Phylum: Chordata
- Class: Mammalia
- Order: Primates
- Superfamily: Hominoidea
- Family: incertae sedis
- Genus: †Samburupithecus; Ishida and Pickford, 1997
- Species: †S. kiptalami

Binomial name
- †Samburupithecus kiptalami Ishida and Pickford, 1997

= Samburupithecus =

Samburupithecus Temporal range: 9.5 Million years ago

Extinct genus of primate from Miocene Kenya

Samburupithecus is an extinct primate that lived in Kenya during the Middle to Late Miocene. The one species in this genus, Samburupithecus kiptalami, is known only from a maxilla fragment dated to 9.5 million years ago discovered in 1982 and formally described by Ishida & Pickford 1997. The type specimen KNM-SH 8531 was discovered by the Joint Japan-Kenya Expedition at the SH22 fossil site in the Samburu District, a locality where several other researchers found no ape fossils.

Samburupithecus lived during the so-called "African ape gap" 14 to 7 Ma, a period from which very few hominoid fossils have been found in Africa until relatively recently. This apparent gap, however, is now populated by a diversity of apes such as Nakalipithecus, Chororapithecus abyssinicus, Otavipithecus, and Nacholapithecus.

== Taxonomy ==
The elongated teeth are unlike many other Miocene hominoids, linking Samburupithecus the taxon to gorillas, chimpanzees and hominins, but its relationships within this clade is at present unclear. Because of this mixture of primitive and derived traits in the KNM-SH 8531 specimen, it has been proposed that Samburupithecus lived before the gorilla-chimpanzee-hominin split and, therefore, that it is a common ancestor to these primates alongside Ouranopithecus. Recently, an analysis found Samburupithecus to belong to the family Oreopithecidae alongside Oreopithecus.

== Description ==
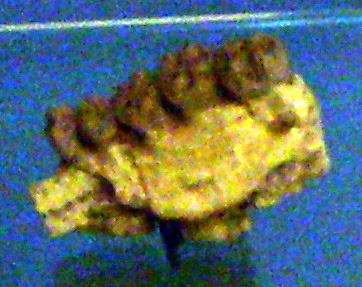
Jaw fragment

Samburupithecus was approximately 60 kilograms (130 lb) and was most likely a frugivorous terrestrial quadruped. Paleoenvironmental reconstructions indicate that Samburupithecus most likely lived in a wooded habitat surrounded by savannah.

Defining cranial traits of this genus include low, broad zygomatics, straight alveolar process and large maxillary sinus. Defining dental traits include three-rooted premolars, thick enamel and bunodont cusps.

The teeth in the Samburupithecus type maxilla are comparable in size to those of the type mandible of Nakalipithecus, roughly the size of a modern female gorilla. The upper premolars of both are elongated mesiodistally (along the row of teeth), but those of Samburupithecus have more inflated cusps that are positioned more centrally, so that occlusal foveae and basins (depressions at top of teeth) are very restricted. This suggests that Samburupithecus was strongly specialized compared to other Miocene and extant apes. Another distinguishing feature between the two is the higher relief of the dentine/enamel junction in Samburupithecus.

== See also ==
- List of fossil sites (with link directory)
- List of human evolution fossils (with images)
