= Evolution of primates =

Origin and diversification of primates through geologic time

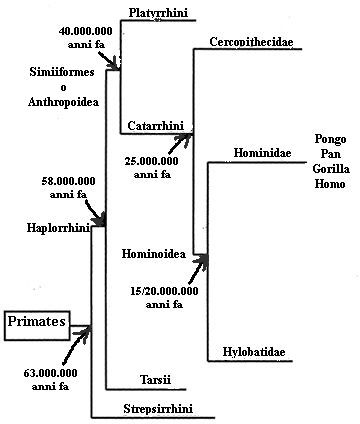
Phylogenetic tree of the primates

The evolutionary history of the primates can be traced back 57-90 million years. One of the oldest known primate-like mammal species, Plesiadapis, came from North America; another, Archicebus, came from China. Other such early primates include Altiatlasius and Algeripithecus, which were found in Northern Africa. Other similar basal primates were widespread in Eurasia and Africa during the tropical conditions of the Paleocene and Eocene. Purgatorius is the genus of the four extinct species believed to be among the earliest example of a primate or a proto-primate, a primatomorph precursor to the Plesiadapiformes, dating to as old as 66 million years ago.

The surviving tropical population of primates, which is seen most completely in the upper Eocene and lowermost Oligocene fossil beds of the Faiyum depression southwest of Cairo, gave rise to all living species—lemurs of Madagascar, lorises of Southeast Asia, galagos or "bush babies" of Africa, and the anthropoids: platyrrhine or New World monkeys, catarrhines or Old World monkeys, and the apes, including Homo sapiens.

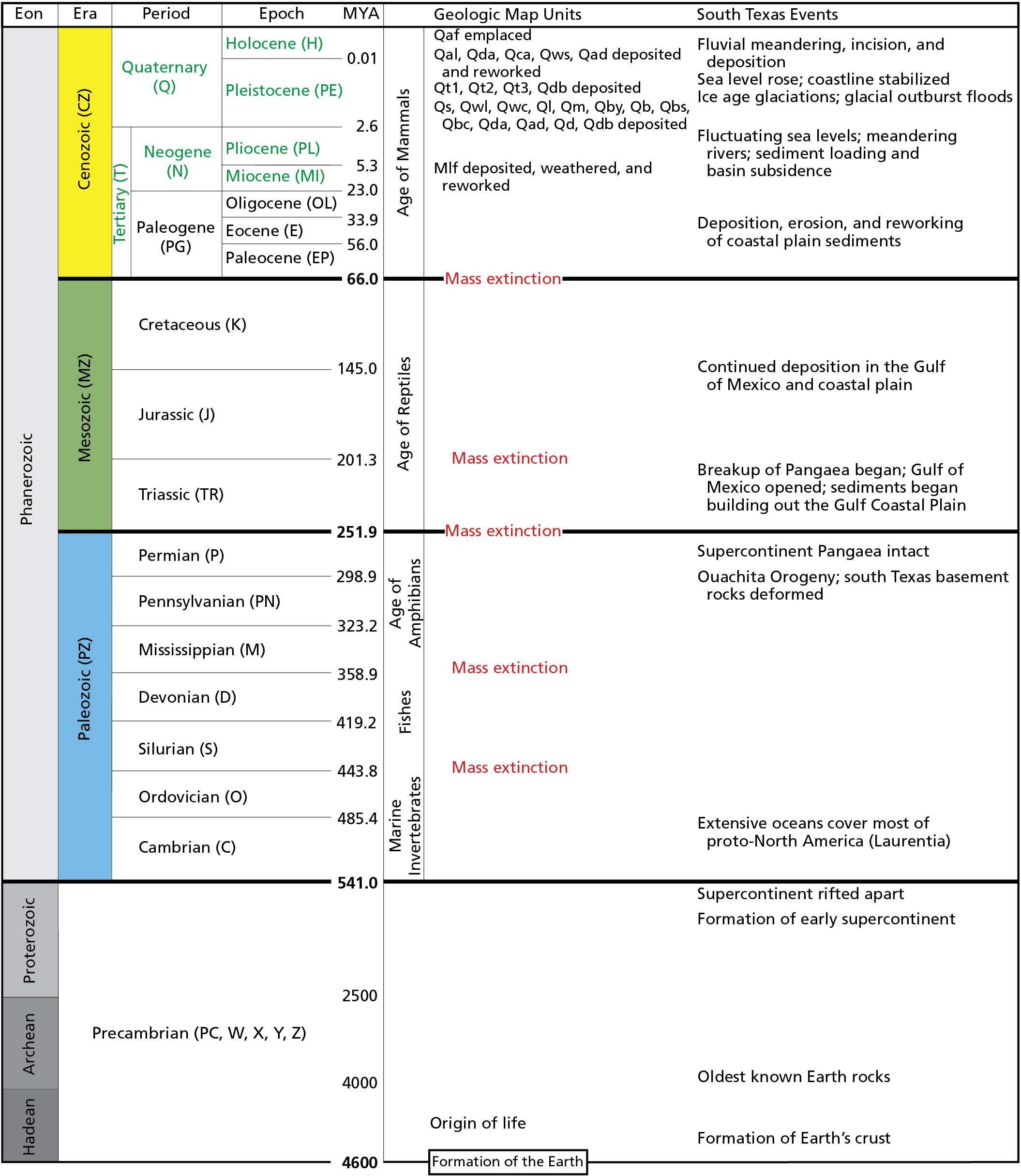
Geologic timescale

== Early primate evolution ==
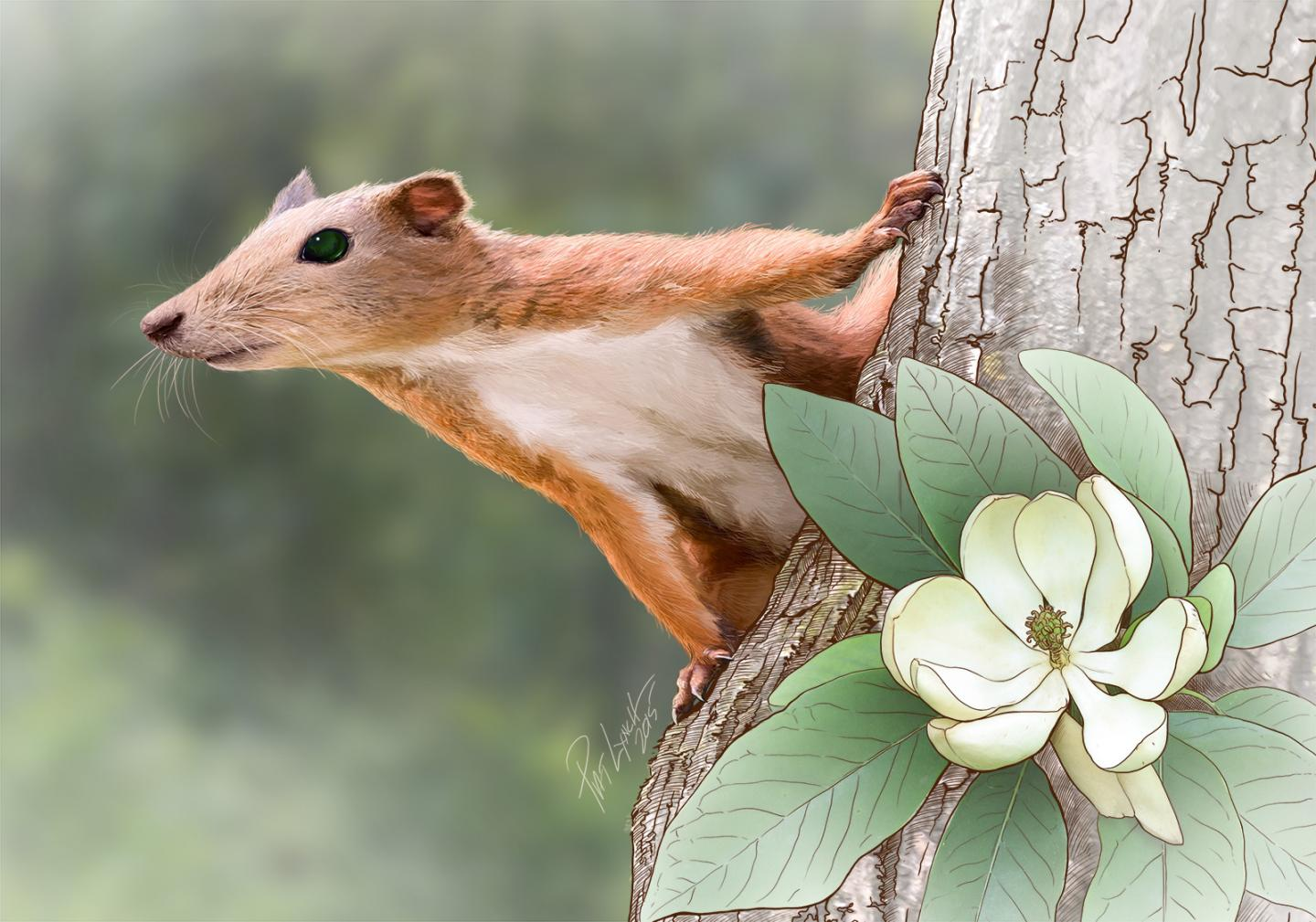
Artistic rendering of Purgatorius, an early plesiadapiform

Primates are believed to have diverged from other mammals during the Late Cretaceous period of the Mesozoic Era. Fossils of Cretaceous primates are virtually non-existent, with estimates based on molecular data instead of morphological information. The oldest record of stem-primates comes from the order Plesiadapiformes in the earliest Paleocene epoch shortly following the Cretaceous-Paleogene (K/PG) extinction event. The plesiadapiform subfamily Purgatoriidae represents the earliest plesiadapiform lineage known to diversify, as fossils of the family are known from sediments across North America within ~140,000 years of the K/PG extinction. Though fossils of purgatoriids are rare and limited to fragmentary elements, they are considered to be stem-primates based on the morphology of their ankles which share several features with both Plesiadapiformes and wider members of Euarchonta. This placement has been supported in subsequent phylogenetic analyses. The morphology of purgatoriids suggests an arboreal lifestyle that has been hypothesized as ancestral to crown primates, while their tooth morphology, which possesses a mixture of pointed and rounded cusps, is theorized to have supported an insectivorous or omnivorous diet depending on the species. Other fossils in the group reveal long snouts with large upper incisors and laterally facing orbits lacking postorbital bars, also suggesting early primate traits.

Throughout the Paleocene and Eocene epochs, plesiadapiforms underwent a substantial radiation based in North America and Europe, though several species are known from Asia as well. In total, eleven different plesiadapiform families are recognized from the fossil record, encompassing over 25 million years of time and displaying a wide diversity of dietary behaviors. The oldest fossils of euprimates come from the Paleocene-Eocene transition, approximately 57 million years ago, and already demonstrate a split between haplorhines and strepsirrhines. This, in combination with molecular studies, suggests that the divergence of haplorhines and strepsirrhines came in the Paleocene, estimated to be sometime between 64 and 63 million years ago.

== Evolution of strepsirrhines ==
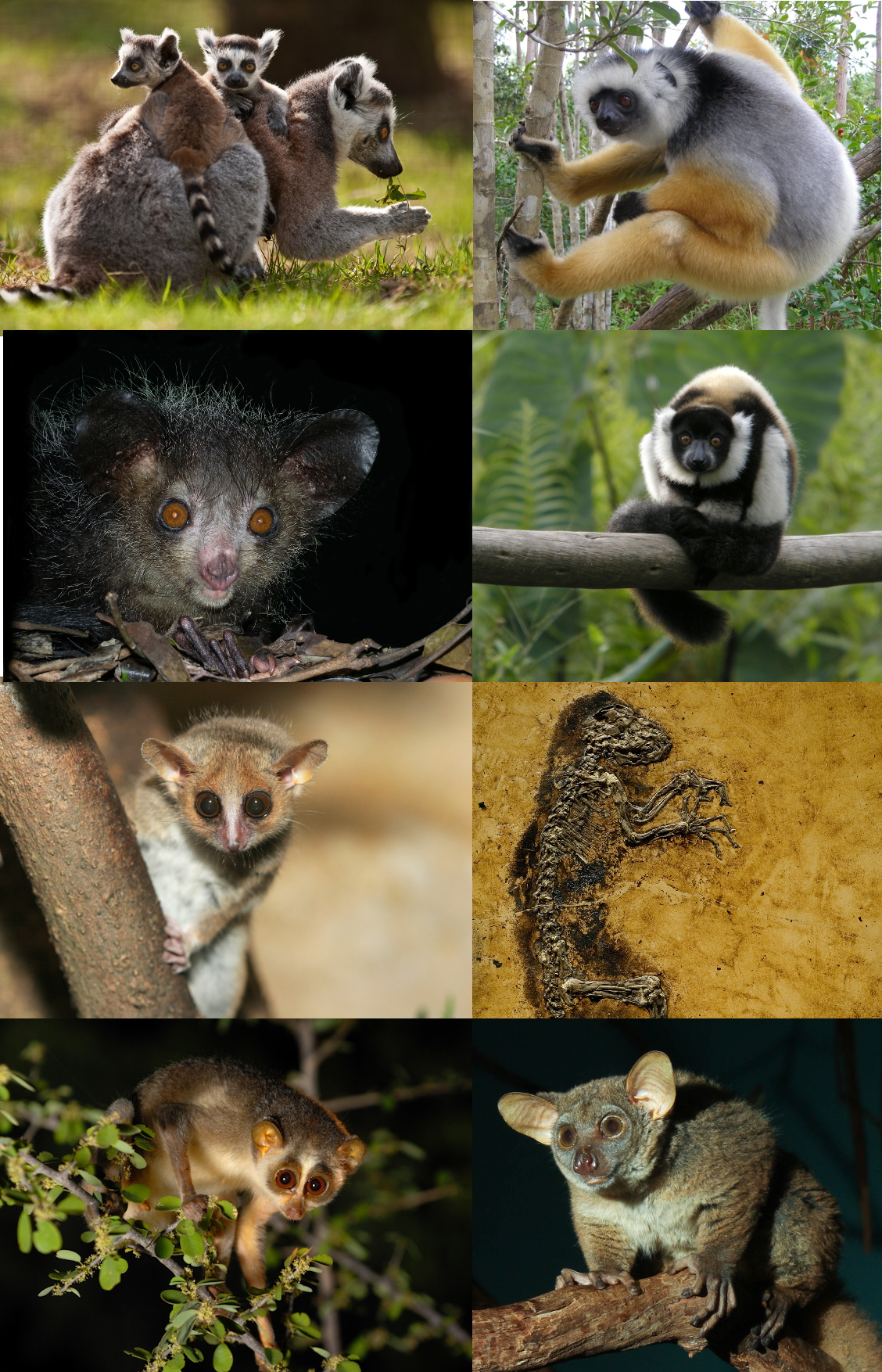
Sample of Strepsirrhine Diversity

=== A note on "prosimians" ===
Strepsirrhines, the group of primates including lemurs, lorises, and galagos, is also part of the older categorization "prosimians". The "prosimian" category is a paraphyletic group which includes all strepsirrhines and tarsiers. Tarsiers are part of the monophyletic clade of Haplorhinii but share some traits with Strepsirrhines leading to the older mis-categorization creating the group "prosimians". A significant amount of fossil work still discusses Strepsirhini within the context of prosimians because of the shared morphological and locomotor traits between Strepsirhini and Tarsiformes, namely: presence of a Grooming claw, clinging and leaping locomotion, Unfused mandibular symphysis, high cusped molar teeth, and a bicornate uterus.

=== Adapoids: Potential early strepsirrhines ===
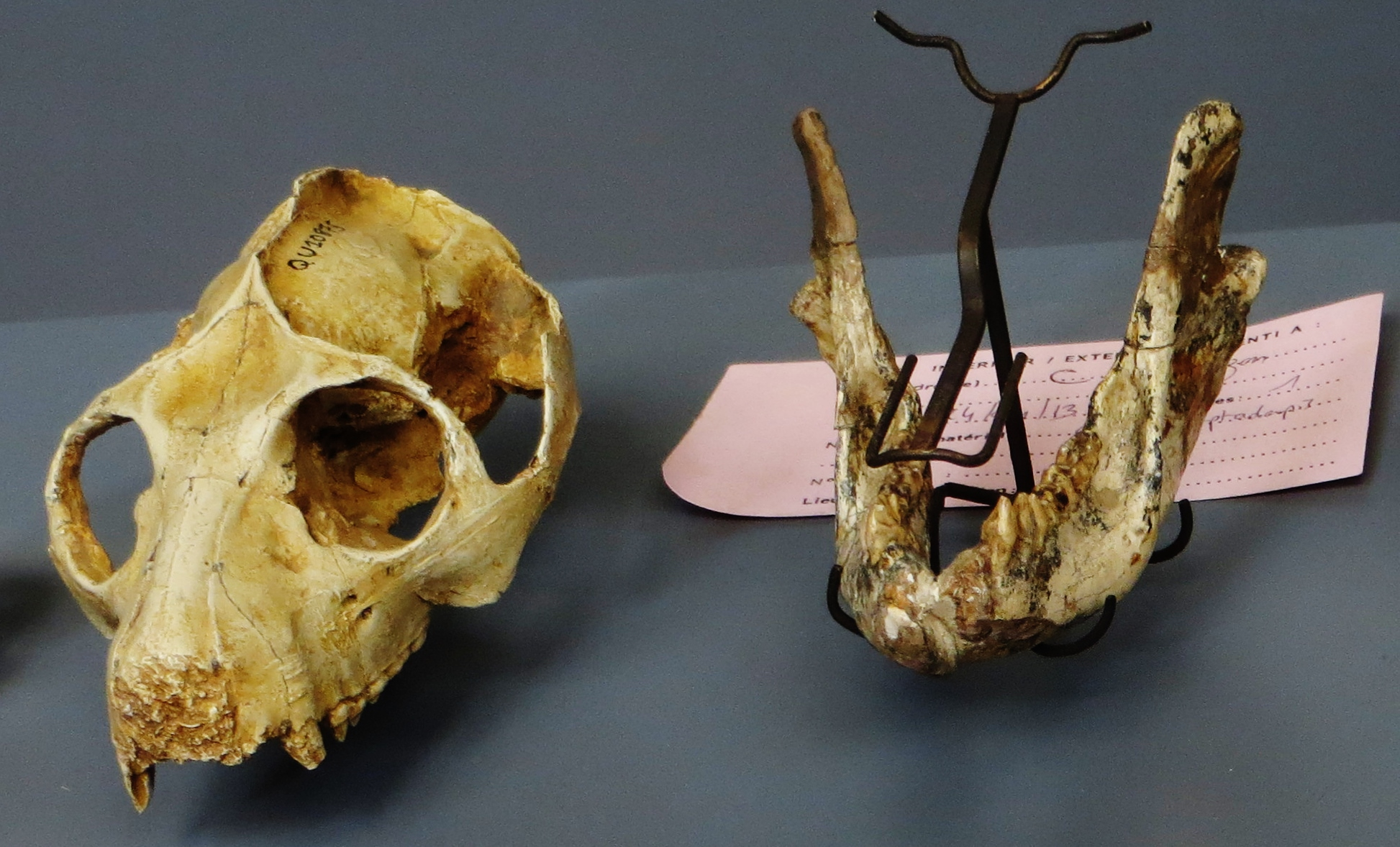
Magnadapis quercyi cranium and mandible. Original photo from Leptadapis article, using older genera classification.

The earliest strepsirrhines are known as adapiforms, a diverse group that ranged throughout Eurasia and North America. Adapoids share several traits with modern Strepsirrhines including: long snouts, relatively small eyes, a long nasolacrimal canal indicating a rhinarium or "wet nose", a gap between small incisors to access their vomeronasal organ, canines larger than their incisors, and an inflated bony auditory bulla with a suspended tympanic ring. Adapoids originated in the Eocene, and though they survived till the late miocene, the earliest known strepsirhines appear in North African fossil beds from the Eocene. This indicates that, despite the longevity of adapoids, an early branch of this clade gave rise to lemuriform primates, including lemurs and their kin.

There are currently six adapiform clades: Notharctids, Cercamoniids or Protoadapids, Caenopithecids, Adapids, Sivaladapids, and Asiadapids.

Early European fauna is also exemplified by Darwinius, a basal strepsirrhine, or haplorhine dated to 47 million years ago (early Eocene)

==== Darwinius masillae ====
Darwineus masilae is a primate fossil from an Eocene lagerstätte in Messel, Germany. Preserved in oil shale in an anoxic lake bed, the skeleton is laterally crushed but articulated, preserving the outline of the long bones and leaving irregular and short bones relatively intact. Darwinius (or "Ida," as the adolescent female has been nicknamed) has an estimated body mass of 650-1000g, and dentition and stomach contents indicating a herbivorous diet. Ida has a low intermembral index (long hindlimbs compared to forelimbs), indicating potential for clinging and leaping locomotion, and large orbits compared to skull length indicating nocturnality.

Since its discovery, Darwinius's mixture of primitive and derived traits has led to disagreements on its phylogenetic placement. Although this is fairly common within paleoprimatology, the Eocene time period and array of anthropoid and primitive traits specifically could influence the phylogenetic placement of adapoids and omomyoids depending on when the derived traits present in Darwinius evolved. It has a mixture of more basal and derived traits. Its short rostrum, fused mandibular symphysis, deep mandibular ramus, fused mandibular symphysis, spatulate incisors, quadrate lower molars, uncompressed mesocuneiform, and lack of tooth comb all align well with derived haplorhines.

Meanwhile, the lack of postorbital closure, a potentially sloping tibulo-fibular facet, and implacable grooming claw perpetuate the debate by indicating strepsirrhine phylogeny. Authors supporting this hypothesis state that many of the traits used to associate Darwinius with haplorhines are athropoid traits, while Darwinius lacks many basal haplorhine traits. They argue that spatulate incisors could be (and often are in primates) a symplesiomorphies for diet specialization rather than an indicator of haplorhine heritage. They also argue that a quadrate molar should not be counted as evidence for haplorhine relation, as many anthropoids do not have one.

Two points on which authors illustrate inter-observer variation are the condition of the tibulo-fibular facet and the nail or claw on digit II. Williams et al. argue that the tibulo-fibular facet is crushed and cannot be adequately observed for inference, while Gingerich et al. argue that it is not too crushed or obscured to infer it is sloping but also argue this is likely a primitive condition rather than a derived one. While both Williams and Gingerich say digit II has a nail, Williams argues it is symplesiomorphic with anthropoids while Gingrich claims it indicates early haplorhine traits.

=== Lorisiform evolution ===
Lorisiforms are members of the superfamily Lorisoidea, within which are the families Galagidae (bushbabies and galagos) and Lorisidae (lorises and pottos). Loris and galago phylogeny is difficult to trace for a number of reasons, including the crypsis of both groups, arboreal lifetyles in densly forested environments, and frequent convergence on similar morphologies. Researchers continue to disagree on the phylogenetic organization of extant lorisiformes, primarily whether the subfamily Perodicticinae (angwantibos and pottos / African lorises) is truly a sister group to Lorisinae (Asian lorises) or more closely related to extant Galagidae (galagos) and subject to a surprising convergence with lorises. Galagos are characterized by leaping saltatorial locomotion aided by elongated tarsal bones and insectivory, while lorises and pottos are known for a form of slow arboreal quadrupedalism and secondarily shortened tarsal bones. However, lorises are subject to significant morphological plasticity based on diet; for example, slow lorises and pottos are primarily frugivorous and exudate eaters, requiring less stereoscopic vision, while slender lorises and angwantibos, which are nocturnal predators, have more convergent orbits and thereby more stereoscopic vision.

Based on mitochondrial cytochrome sampling of modern taxa, lorises and galagos split from lemurs has been estimated to the Late Paleocene. Continuing disagreement on the constitution of each clade makes classifying fragmentary fossil primates even more difficult. Karanisia clarki and Saharagalago, both dating to 37mya Fayum deposits in Egypt, are two of the oldest potential Lorisiformes. Saharagalago is a stem galagid from Fayum, Egypt, 37mya; although its dentition is very similar to modern galagos, it is still considered a potential stem member of Galagidae or Lorisoidae. Consisting of only a mandible fragment and a few isolated teeth, Karanisia clarki is the oldest fossil primate known to have a tooth comb. Karanisia's estimated body mass is 273grams. Dental morphology and microwear analysis of the molars indicate a potential for folivory. However, a completely folivorous diet is prohibited by the energy and metabolic requirements of its size, leading researchers to reconstruct Karanisia as an omnivore. Karanisia molars closely resembles those of the living lorisid Arctocebus, the golden potto. Although its position as the oldest tooth-combed primate fossil places it confidently within at least stem Strepsirrhini, many researchers debate if it is a crown strepsirhini, stem lorisoid, or stem lemuroid.

Wadilemur elgans is a later stem galagid from 35mya; in addition to similar dental features to modern galagos, it also has evidence of leaping traits.

==== Semicircular canals in primate locomotion ====
Semicircular canals are often used by paleontologists and paleoanthropologists to inform locomotor estimations when there is limited postcranial evidence for a species. Semicircular canals are held within the petrous portion of the temporal bone, a very thick and often well-preserved portion of the skull. Semicircular canals with a larger radius of curvature and more intraspecific consistency can indicate faster movement, as more surface area is needed for more precise perception of balance. In contrast, animals that move more slowly tend to have more variation in general, as their canals are not under pressure to maintain a certain morphology. Galagos generally utilize a clinging and leaping locomotion, while lorises tend towards a slow arboreal quadrupedal form of locomotion. As a result, there is a noticeable and quantifiable difference in their semicircular canal volumes, which can be quantified and used to assign fossil crania or partial crania to a range of speed and by extension infer each locomotion.

=== Malagasy radiation ===
==== Lemurs ====
Lemurs constitute the clade Lemuridae, the sister clade to Lorisidae. All extant lemurs are currently isolated on the island of Madagascar. Lemurs are believed to have colonized Madagascar in the early Tertiary period, about 40 mya. Recent genetic evidence suggests that lemurs are one monophyletic group distinct from lorisiformes, supporting the idea that there was one colonization event; this would mean the ancestor of all modern lemurs arrived on Madagascar once rather than several ancestors of different groups arriving at different times. One hypothesis for lemurs' diversity on Madagascar and absence in the rest of Africa is that they or their ancestors were outcompeted by monkeys and lorisoids in continental Africa but were able to radiate into similar niches in isolation on Madagascar. Recent research suggests that the adaptive radiation in Madagascar might have been comparatively gradual, rather than a sudden burst, with hybridization and genetic introgression resulting in more diversity and aiding speciation. Modern lemurs are divided into five families: daubentoniids (which likely branched off first), lemurids, lepilemurids, indriids, and cheirogalids.

==== Giant lemurs ====
In the late Pleistocene, there were a plethora of giant lemurs inhabiting Madagascar; many of these species were in genera that no longer have any living members. There were three primary groups: archeolemurs, megladapines, and paleopropithecines. All three clades are characterized by large size and slow maturation, but each is associated with a set of derived traits convergent with separate mammalian groups.

Archaeolemurines, weighing between 26 kg and 35 kg, are also called "monkey lemurs" due to their convergent traits with Cercopithecines. This family includes the genera Hadropithecus and Archaeolemur. They have a lemur-like ear and lack a postorbital closure, consistent with their status as lemurs. However, they also have broad flat incisors with no gap between the two central incisors, a fused mandibular symphysis, and bilophodont molar teeth, which are consistent with cercopitheocoid monkeys. The family also has unique adaptations such as a caniniform anterior premolar rather than a true canine tooth. They have a mixture of dental traits similar to catarrhines, including shearing premolars (indicative of foliovory), low rounded bilophodont molars (indicative of frugivory), and enamel microstructure conducive to hard seed or insect crushing. Altogether, researchers believe archeolemurs likely had an omnivorous diet. The short limbs relative to trunk length are indicative of arboreal quadrupedalism, though smaller limb features are more similar to gorillas' terrestrial quadrupedalism.

Megaladapines are referred to as "koala lemurs" due to their hypothesized posturing and folivorous diet. Containing only the genus Megaladapis, at about 70 kg, they were as large as modern gorillas but had no upper incisors. Extremely short limbs and teeth with well-developed crests indicate a highly folivorous diet. Researchers believe they likely clung to thick tree trunks much like a koala, and their lack of upper incisors indicate they may have had a horny pad or plate on their maxilla to help grind food like Artiodactyla. The buttressing extending above the nasal aperture has led some researchers to hypothesize that megaladapines might have had a highly mobile upper lip or proboscis like a giraffe or elephant.

Paleopropithecines, ranging in size between 11 kg and 160 kg, are called "sloth lemurs" because of their extremely sloth-like limb proportions and reduced dentition. They have a very high intermembral index of 144, indicating extemely long forelimbs compared to hindlimbs, which aligns well with modern primates' and sloths' suspensory behavior. Their similarity to sloths extend to their very curved phalanges, resembling suspensory apes like orangutans morphologically and sloths' curved claws ecologically. Their incisors were stubby, indicating they played little role in diet, and their molars were well-adapted to folivory. Due to their similarities to living indriids (including suspensory feeding postures, four toothed tooth comb, and reduced dentition overall), they are generally placed in a monophyletic subfamily within Indriidae. This subfamily includes the genera Mesopropithecus, Babakotia, Paleopropithecus, and Archaeoindris. Archaeoindris is the largest subfossil lemur currently known at around 160 kg.

== Evolution of haplorhines ==
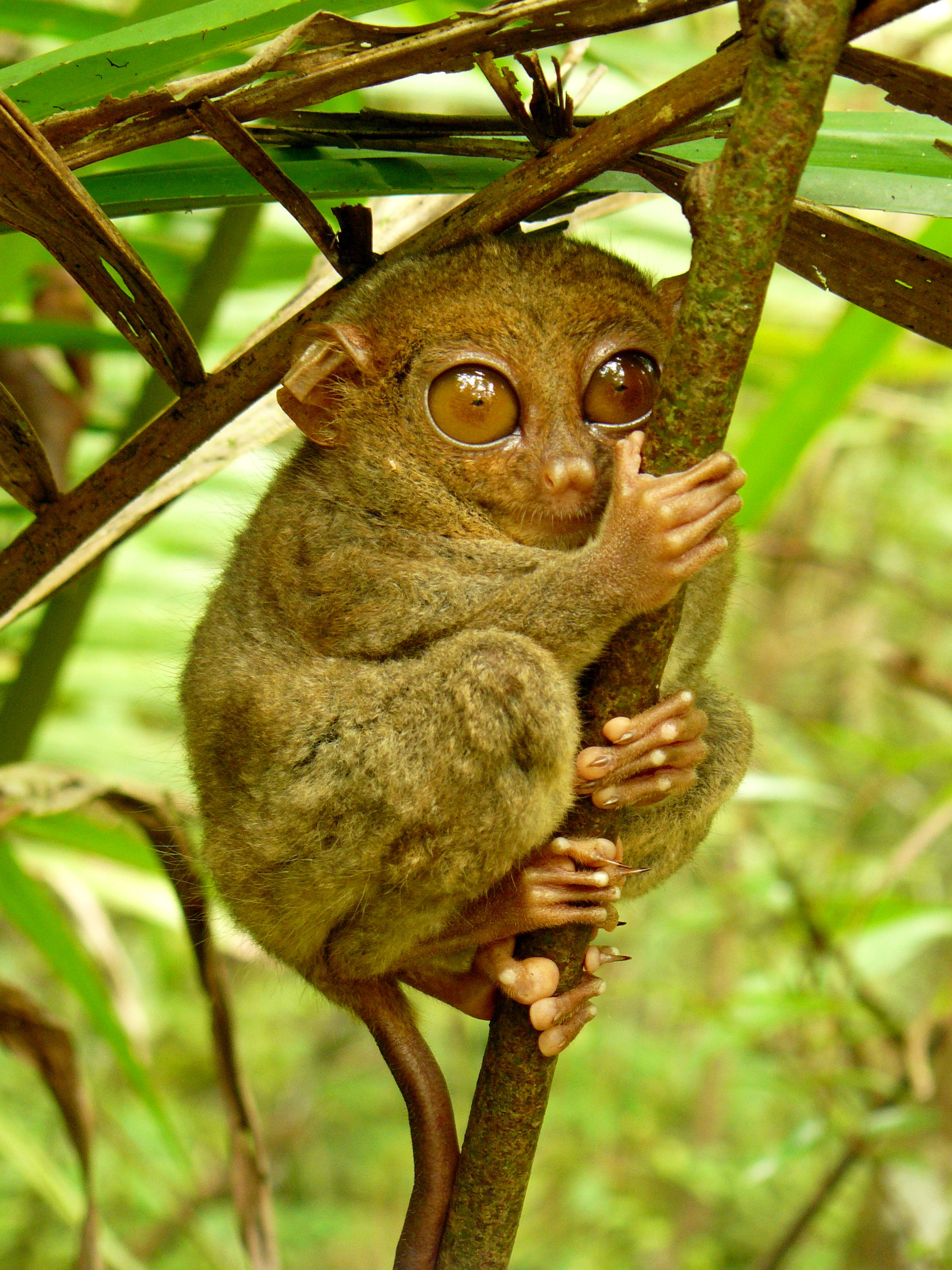
Sample of the haplorhine family Tarsioidea

Haplorhines can be separated from the more primitive strepsirrhines. Haplorhines possess a retinal fovea on the posterior surface of their eyeballs. They have an orbital plate disjoining their orbits and temporal fossa, and relatively smaller olfactory bulbs than strepsirrhines with fewer nasal turbinates. Haplorhines also have a reduced vomeronasal organ, a dry rhinarium, and a vertical nasolacrimal duct connecting the orbit to the nasal cavity.

The oldest haplorhines in the fossil record are from the Paleocene-Eocene, a period of time associated with a global warming event. The climate of the early and middle Eocene was warm, and more frequent warming events allowed for the survival and spread of early groups. Haplorhine origins are assumed to date to the Eocene in Africa, but they probably radiated from that region due to climate change. Early primates and haplorhines must have been found much farther north than they are today. Their geographic range is thought to be about 60°N latitude, close to the Arctic Circle.

The primate superfamilies Tarsioidea and Adapiformes were the major primate groups of the early and middle Eocene. Early Tarsioidea and Adapoidea are thought to be stem or crown groups of haplorhines because of their comparable fossil dentitions. Tarsioidea is now maintained by the living genus Tarsius. Adapoidea members have no living relatives, but are thought to have been precursors of apes and monkeys. Other early haplorhine groups include Ceboidea and Hominoidea from the Oligocene and Cercopithecoidea from the early Miocene. Living haplorhines are tarsiers or anthropoids.

=== Omomyids: Potential early haplorhines ===
The oldest fossil haplorhine primates are the omomyids, which resemble modern-day tarsiers. Omomyids first appear at the beginning of the Eocene, around 56 million years ago. Like the strepsirrhine adapiforms, omomyids were diverse and ranged throughout Eurasia and North America. The phylogeny of omomyids, tarsiers, and simians is currently unknown.

One of the oldest known omomyids in the fossil record is an articulated but incomplete skeleton of the species Archicebus achilles. The fossil was uncovered in the lower Eocene Yangxu Formation in China. It is thought to be from the early Eocene of China, around 55 million years ago. A. achilles is very small with long limbs and a long tail. It has a rounded braincase, short snout, vertically facing upper canine, four premolars in each jaw quadrant, long hindlimbs, long feet, and a long tail. A. achilles has features similar to those of the anthropoid and tarsiiform groups within haplorhines: its calcaneal shape and metatarsal proportions in the foot resemble those of anthropoids, and its skull, dentition, and parts of its appendicular skeleton resemble those of tarsiiforms.

== Evolution of color vision ==
Some of the primates' vertebrate ancestors were tetrachromats, but their nocturnal mammalian ancestors lost two of their four cones during the Mesozoic. Most modern primates, however, have evolved to be trichromats. All Old World monkeys and apes are trichromats, but New World monkeys are polymorphic trichromats, meaning that males and homozygous females are dichromat while heterozygous females are trichromats (with the exceptions of howler monkeys and night monkeys, which have more and less robust color vision respectively).

There are four prevailing theories as to what the evolutionary pressure was for primates to develop trichromatic vision. The fruit theory suggests that it was easier for trichromatic primates to find ripe fruit against a green background. While there is data supporting the fruit theory, there is some dispute about whether or not trichromacy was more advantageous for determining how ripe fruit was up close or spotting fruit from afar. The young leaf hypothesis suggests that primates with more advanced color vision could better spot younger and more nutritious leaves during fruit shortages. Another theory suggests that more advanced color vision was better for recognizing changes in skin tone, allowing primates to better determine the blood oxygen saturation of others. The fourth theory postulates that primates' color vision evolved alongside their sense of smell, though research has shown no direct correlation between concentration of olfactory receptors and acquisition of color vision.

== Evolution of platyrrhines (New World monkeys) ==
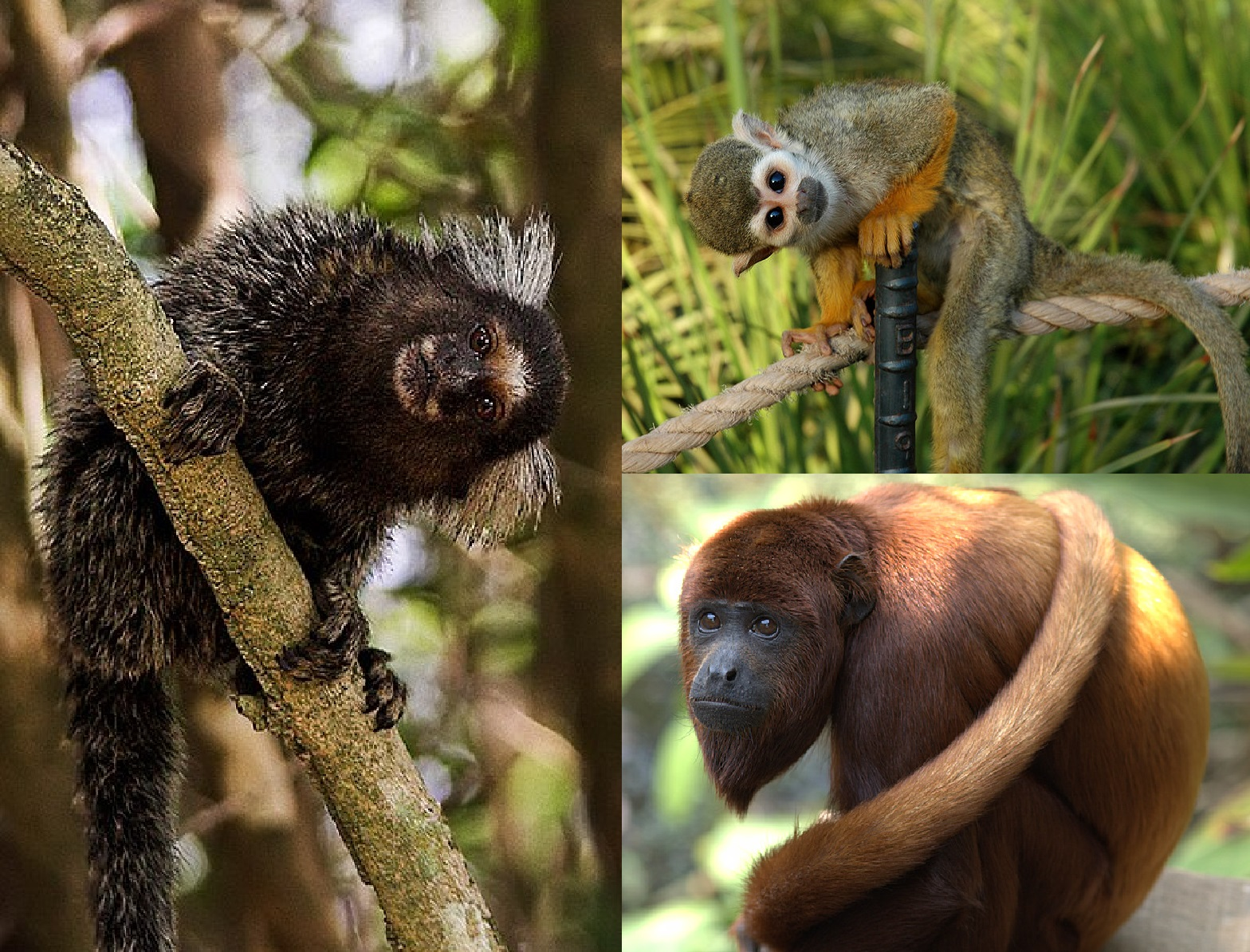
A selection of extant Platyrrhini

Following the emergence of Simiiformes in Africa, the pavorder Platyrrhini (New World Monkeys) split from Catarrhini during the Eocene period, sometime around 40 million years ago on the African continent. Their present distribution in South America is theorized to have resulted from rafting across the Atlantic Ocean, with dispersal events facilitated by large mats of vegetation capable of transporting small populations to South America. Transportation of vegetation rafts were aided by a relatively narrower Atlantic, which is hypothesized to have been ~1,000 km narrower than today based on calculated rates of mid-ocean ridge spreading at 2.5 mm per year, and differing paleocurrents which produced westwards movement of currents. Given the favorable currents and limited width of the Atlantic, rafting events are estimated to have taken only eight to fifteen days depending on when they occurred. Similar dispersal mechanisms have also been proposed in Caviomorph rodents. Three separate transoceanic dispersal events between Africa and South America are theorized to have occurred within primates due to the presence of several non-platyrrhine primates from fossil deposits in South America.

The exact timing of platyrrhine dispersal is debated. Historically, a mid-to-late Oligocene dispersal was viewed as likely based on fossil and molecular data. Bayesian estimates of divergence time have indicated the most recent common ancestor of New World monkeys existed between 27-31 million years ago. Additionally, the platyrrhine species Branisella boliviana, found in the Salla Luribay basin and dated to the Late Oligocene (26 million years ago), was believed to represent the oldest known stem platyrrhine. However, new evidence suggests an earlier origin, as fossils of the species Perupithecus ucayaliensis from the Peruvian Amazon date to approximately 36 million years ago. This pushes the date of platyrrhine dispersal to the late Eocene, approximately 37 million years ago and 10 million years older than previously considered.

Fossils of platyrrhines are infrequent and difficult to access, mainly due to the dense forest cover of South America and the poor probability of fossilization in rainforest habitats. The best material from stem platyrrhines belongs to the Oligocene genus Branisella, whose anatomy suggests it was a semiterrestrial omnivore that occupied woodland habitats. The record of platyrrhines in the Miocene is more extensive. Platyrrhines from the earliest Miocene (20-15 million years ago) are known primarily from fossils in the Southern Cone of South America, an area that rests outside their present distribution. The southern platyrrhines show adaptations for frugivory and granivory, particularly seeds and hard fruits that reflect the dry habitats occupied by several taxa, and show anatomical affinities with the platyrrhine subfamily Pitheciidae, though this relationship is debated. Fossils from the middle-to-late Miocene are distributed in northern countries in South America, particularly the La Venta fossil site of Colombia, and show the evolution of several modern platyrrhine subfamilies, including relatives of howler monkeys, cebids, night monkeys, callitrichids, and titi monkeys, among others.

== Evolution of Old World monkeys ==
The earliest known catarrhine is Kamoyapithecus from uppermost Oligocene at Eragaleit in the northern Kenya Rift Valley, dated to 24 million years ago. Its ancestry is thought to be species related to Aegyptopithecus, Propliopithecus, and Parapithecus from the Faiyum depression, at around 35 million years ago. In 2010, Saadanius was described as a close relative of the last common ancestor of the crown catarrhines, and tentatively dated to 29–28 million years ago, helping to fill an 11-million-year gap in the fossil record. Notable species also include Nsungwepithecus gunnelli and Rukwapithecus fleaglei of the Oligocene.

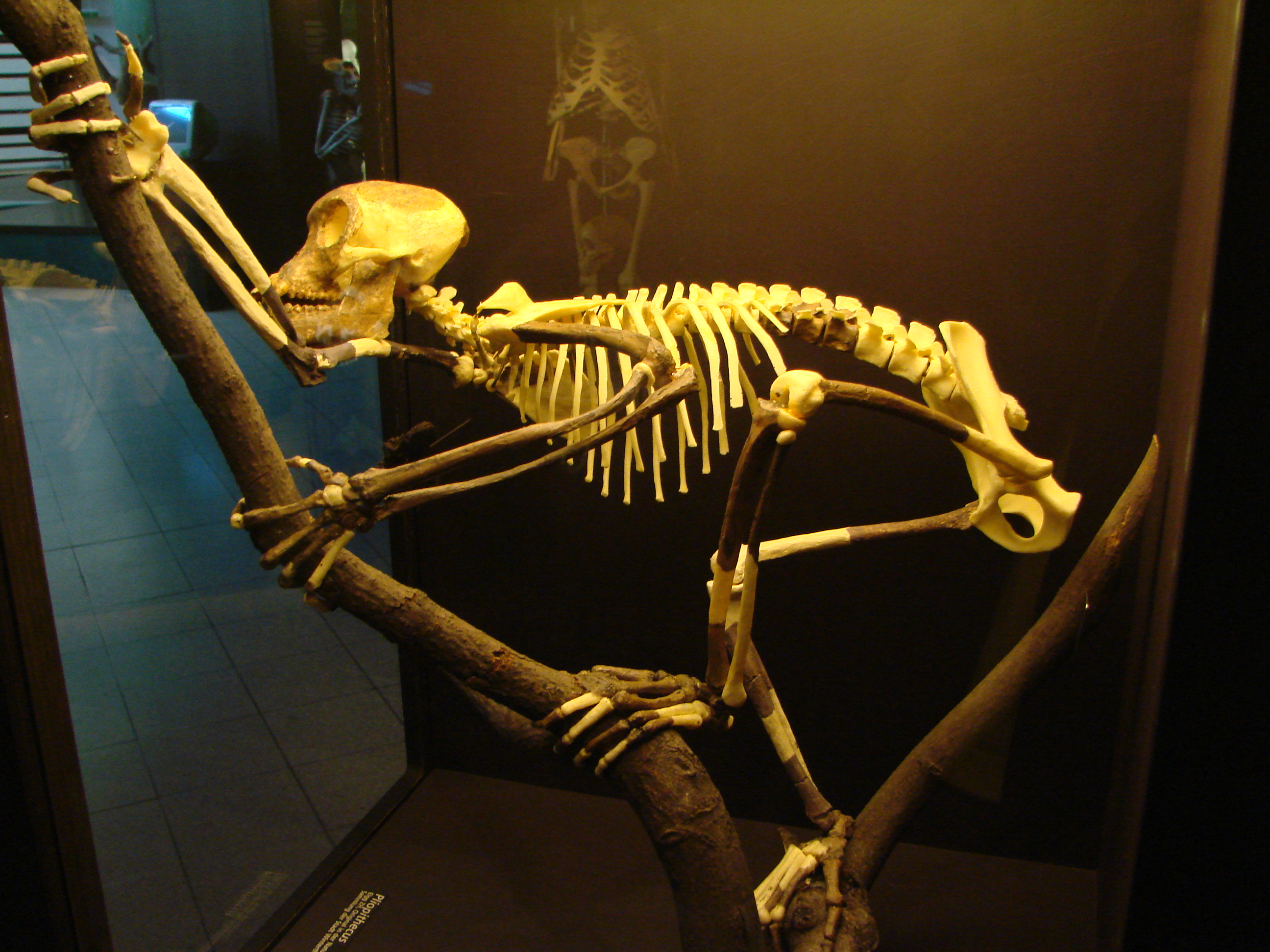
Reconstructed tailless Proconsul skeleton

In the early Miocene, about 22 million years ago, the many kinds of arboreally adapted primitive catarrhines from East Africa suggest a long history of prior diversification. Fossils dated to be 20 million years old include fragments attributed to Victoriapithecus, believed to be the earliest Old World monkey. Among the genera thought to be in the ape lineage leading up to 13 million years ago are Proconsul, Rangwapithecus, Dendropithecus, Limnopithecus, Nacholapithecus, Equatorius, Nyanzapithecus, Afropithecus, Heliopithecus, and Kenyapithecus, all from East Africa.

The presence of other generalized non-cercopithecids of the middle Miocene age from sites far distant—Otavipithecus from cave deposits in Namibia, and Pierolapithecus and Dryopithecus from France, Spain and Austria—is evidence of a wide diversity of forms across Africa and the Mediterranean basin during the relatively warm climatic regimes of the early and middle Miocene. The youngest of the Miocene hominoids, Oreopithecus, is from coal beds in Italy that have been dated to 9 million years ago.

Molecular evidence indicates that the lineage of gibbons (family Hylobatidae) diverged from Great Apes some 12 to 18 million years ago, and that of orangutans (subfamily Ponginae) diverged from the other great apes at about twelve million years; there are no fossils that clearly document the ancestry of gibbons, which may have originated in a so-far-unknown South East Asian hominoid population, but fossil proto-orangutans may be represented by Sivapithecus from India and Griphopithecus from Turkey, dated to around 10 million years ago.

=== Human evolution ===
Human evolution is the evolutionary process that led to the emergence of anatomically modern humans, beginning with the evolutionary history of primates, in particular the genus Homo, and leading to the emergence of Homo sapiens as a distinct species of the hominid family, the great apes. This process involved the gradual development of traits such as human bipedalism and language.

The study of human evolution involves many scientific disciplines, including biological anthropology, primatology, archaeology, paleontology, neurobiology, ethology, linguistics, evolutionary psychology, embryology and genetics. Early genetic studies suggested that primates diverged from other mammals about 85 million years ago, but newer research questions this, suggesting a date around 55 million years ago in the Paleocene, consistent with the earliest fossils.

Within the superfamily Hominoidea (apes), the family Hominidae diverged from the family Hylobatidae (gibbons) some 15 to 20 million years ago; African great apes (subfamily Homininae) diverged from orangutans (Ponginae) about 14 million years ago; the tribe Hominini (humans, Australopithecines and other extinct biped genera, and chimpanzee) parted from the tribe Gorillini (gorillas) between 9 million years ago and 8 million years ago; and, in turn, the subtribes Hominina (humans and biped ancestors) and Panina (chimpanzees) separated about 7.5 million years ago to 5.6 million years ago.

== Evolution of the pelvis ==
In primates, the pelvis consists of four parts: the left and the right hip bones, which meet at the ventral mid-line; the sacrum, which connects the hip bones dorsally; and the coccyx. Each hip bone consists of the ilium, the ischium, and the pubis, and at the time of sexual maturity these bones become fused together, though there is never any movement between them. In humans, the ventral joint of the pubic bones is closed.

In bipedal primates, the ilium is shortened and widened, and the blades are located more laterally than in other primates. These morphological changes are due to the stresses involved in bipedal locomotion, in which the Rectus femoris muscle activates on the stationary leg to counterbalance as the other leg moves forward.

The shape of the pelvic outlet is remarkably small in bipedal primates compared to that of quadrupedal primates because a smaller pelvis provides better balance for bipedal locomotion. As such, modern humans must have fully rotational births. Though it is hypothesized that Australopithecus afarensis had semi-rotational births, no other primates require assisted birth.

== See also ==
- Evolution of mammals
- List of fossil primates
- Timeline of human evolution

== Bibliography ==
- Cameron, David W. (2004). Hominid Adaptations and Extinctions. Sydney: UNSW Press. ISBN 978-0-86840-716-6. LCCN 2004353026. OCLC 57077633.
- Campbell, Bernard (1998). Human Evolution: An Introduction to Man's Adaptations (4th ed.). New York: Aldine de Gruyter. ISBN 978-0-202-02042-6. LCCN 98008760. OCLC 39323020.
- Dawkins, Richard (2004). The Ancestor's Tale: A Pilgrimage to the Dawn of Life. Weidenfeld & Nicolson. ISBN 978-0-297-82503-6.
- Martin, Robert D. (2001). "Primates, Evolution of". In Smelser, Neil J.; Baltes, Paul B. (eds.). International Encyclopedia of the Social & Behavioral Sciences (1st ed.). Amsterdam; New York: Elsevier. pp. 12032–12038. doi:10.1016/B0-08-043076-7/03083-7. ISBN 978-0-08-043076-8. LCCN 2001044791. OCLC 47869490.
- Maxwell, Mary (1984). Human Evolution: A Philosophical Anthropology. New York: Columbia University Press. ISBN 978-0-231-05946-6. LCCN 83024005. OCLC 10163036.
- Srivastava, R. P. (2009). Morphology Of The Primates And Human Evolution. New Delhi: PHI Learning Pvt. Ltd. ISBN 978-81-203-3656-8. OCLC 423293609.
- Wallace, David Rains (2004). Beasts of Eden: Walking Whales, Dawn Horses, and Other Enigmas of Mammal Evolution. Berkeley, CA: University of California Press. p. 240. ISBN 978-0-520-23731-5. LCCN 2003022857. OCLC 56733801.
