= Micropithecus =

Micropithecus Temporal range: Miocene ~19–15 Ma

Scientific classification
- Kingdom: Animalia
- Phylum: Chordata
- Class: Mammalia
- Order: Primates
- Suborder: Haplorhini
- Infraorder: Simiiformes
- Parvorder: Catarrhini
- Genus: †Micropithecus; Fleagle & Simons, 1978

Species
- †M. clarki (Fleagle & Simons, 1978); †M. leakeyorum (Harrison, 1989); †M. chamtwaraensis (Pickford et al., 2021)

Extinct genus of primates

Micropithecus is an extinct genus of primates that lived in East Africa about 19 to 15 million years ago, during the early Miocene. The genus and its type species, Micropithecus clarki, were first scientifically described in 1978.

== Naming ==
The generic name, Micropithecus, is derived from the Greek Words μικρός (ancient Greek pronounced mikrós, "small") and πίθηκος (pronounced píthēkos, "monkey"). Micropithecus thus means "small ape", referring to the fact that the fossils of this genus are among the smallest fossil apes discovered.

== History of description ==
The holotype of both the genus and type species, Micropithecus clarki, is an upper jaw, which is approximately 19 to 17 million years old, with largely preserved palate bones, and remains of bones of the skull. Also preserved in the upper jaw are three left large molars (M1 - M3), as well as one premolar, and three large molars (M1 - M3) on the right side. In addition, about 20 individually found teeth, a mandible fragment and fragments of a skull dome from the same locality were designated as paratypes.

Micropithecus was distinguished from Limnopithecus, Dendropithecus, Dryopithecus and Pliopithecus by the characteristics of its dentition and its small size. Furthermore, in the initial description of the genus and type species, it was pointed out that the morphology of the face of these fossil finds most closely resembles gibbons living today. The head-torso length is roughly equivalent to the white-fronted capuchin monkeys, which are only about 35 centimetres tall, and is slightly smaller than that of the fossil of Aeolopithecus, now considered a junior synonym of Propliopithecus.

== Further finds ==
In 1989, a second species was attributed to the genus Micropithecus, Micropithecus leakeyorum. These are finds from the Maboko Main excavation site on Maboko Island in Lake Victoria, Kenya, dating from 16 to 15 million years ago. This species was placed in the genus Micropithecus based on several mandibular fragments with preserved large molars and on the basis of the characteristics of these teeth, but at the same time it was distinguished from the type species because of the spatial and temporal distance.

In 2021, as part of a revision of the small-bodied anthropoids from Kenyan sites, some finds placed since 1982 with Micropithecus clarki were separated from them as Micropithecus chamtwaraensis; the epithet, chamtwaraensis, refers to the name of the Chamtwara Formation (see List of fossiliferous stratigraphic units in Kenya) in the area of 'Site 34' near the locality of Koru. The holotype is a largely preserved dentate mandible (archive number KNM CA 380).

== Palaeoecology ==
In the first description of Micropithecus leakeyorum, it was discussed that there is no other example in East Africa in the Miocene besides Nyanzapithecus and Micropithecus for a genus of primates existing over several million years whose species could be documented in chronological succession. However, it cannot be concluded from this sequence that the younger species evolved from the older one. The preserved remains of Micropithecus clarki show numerous original features of the Old World monkey, but also various younger features, such as relatively small molars in relation to the jawbone and very large incisors compared to the molars; features that overall suggest a fruit-rich diet. Micropithecus leakeyorum also has features indicative of a fruit-rich diet, but these features are less pronounced than in its older sister species. This has been interpreted as a presumed consequence of less specialisation on a particular diet, giving this species a morphological proximity to the more primitive, much older, Old World monkeys from East Africa.

An explanation for these different characteristics can be found if one considers the palaeoecology: About 19 million years ago, what is now Uganda and western Kenya were predominantly covered by forests, fostered by a warm and humid tropical climate. Later, the climate in this region changed and the forests became thinner and drier. The cause of these changes was probably tectonic processes, which also had a local influence on the extent of precipitation. For the excavation sites on Maboko Island, detailed studies of the plant world have shown that open, sparsely forested landscapes existed there in the Middle Miocene with dense gallery forests along the rivers, comparable to the vegetation of today's Nyika National Park. In such biotopes, it was concluded, the ancestors of Micropithecus leakeyorum gradually adapted to a broader diet that included harder plant fibres.
