= Mabokopithecus =

Mabokopithecus Temporal range: Middle Miocene

Scientific classification
- Kingdom: Animalia
- Phylum: Chordata
- Class: Mammalia
- Order: Primates
- Superfamily: Hominoidea
- Family: †Dendropithecidae
- Subfamily: †Nyanzapithecinae
- Genus: †Mabokopithecus
- Species: †M. clarki

Binomial name
- †Mabokopithecus clarki von Koenigswald, 1969

Extinct genus of primates

Mabokopithecus is an extinct genus of primates that lived in East Africa during the Middle Miocene. It was described by Gustav Heinrich Ralph von Koenigswald in 1969 based on a lower third molar found in Maboko Island.

It is a problematic genus. with some researchers thinking it is not valid at all, or that it doesn't belong in its currently assigned family. It has only one species, M. clarki.

== Morphology ==
Mabokopithecus was a medium-sized anthropoid primate. The holotype molar is long and narrow, with a curved crown and large, rounded cusps. The two front cusps are large and separated by a deep groove. The outer rear cusp is shifted inward, giving the tooth a unusual shape. Several low ridges meet at a small central bump, while the rear cusp is well developed. A narrow, uneven ridge runs along the lower outer edge of the crown.

== Classification ==
In 1969, the genus was described and assigned as an oreopithecoid. Closely related to Oreopithecus.

However, Szalay, Delson (1979) and Andrews (1981) questioned if Mabokopithecus was even a primate at all.

In 1985, Martin Pickford treated the genus as not valid, stating that the holotype was a mutated or abnormal molar of Kenyapithecus africanus, and that the other specimens were those of extinct pigs.

In 1998, Benefit et al. proposed a synonymy between Mabokopithecus and Nyanzapithecus, treating M. clarki as congeneric or even conspecific. That way, Nyanzapithecus pickfordi becomes Mabokopithecus pickfordi (or M. clarki) and N. harrisoni becomes M. harrisoni.

In 2010, Terry Harrison supported that proposal. Although he did not establish it, and not all authors did the same.

In 2013, Stevens et al. treated the genus as an nyanzapithecine, but with doubt. Stating that discoveries of more complete material may change its assignment. In 2017, Kunimatsu et al. did the same.

== Paleoecology ==
During the Middle Miocene, The Maboko formation had a relatively dry climate, with an estimated annual rainfall of 300-500 mm. Its vegetation included seasonally wet wooded grasslands, bushland and woodland along rivers. Mabokopithecus was mainly found in riverine woodland.

These findings suggest that some Miocene primates were already using more open habitats, instead of living only in forests.
