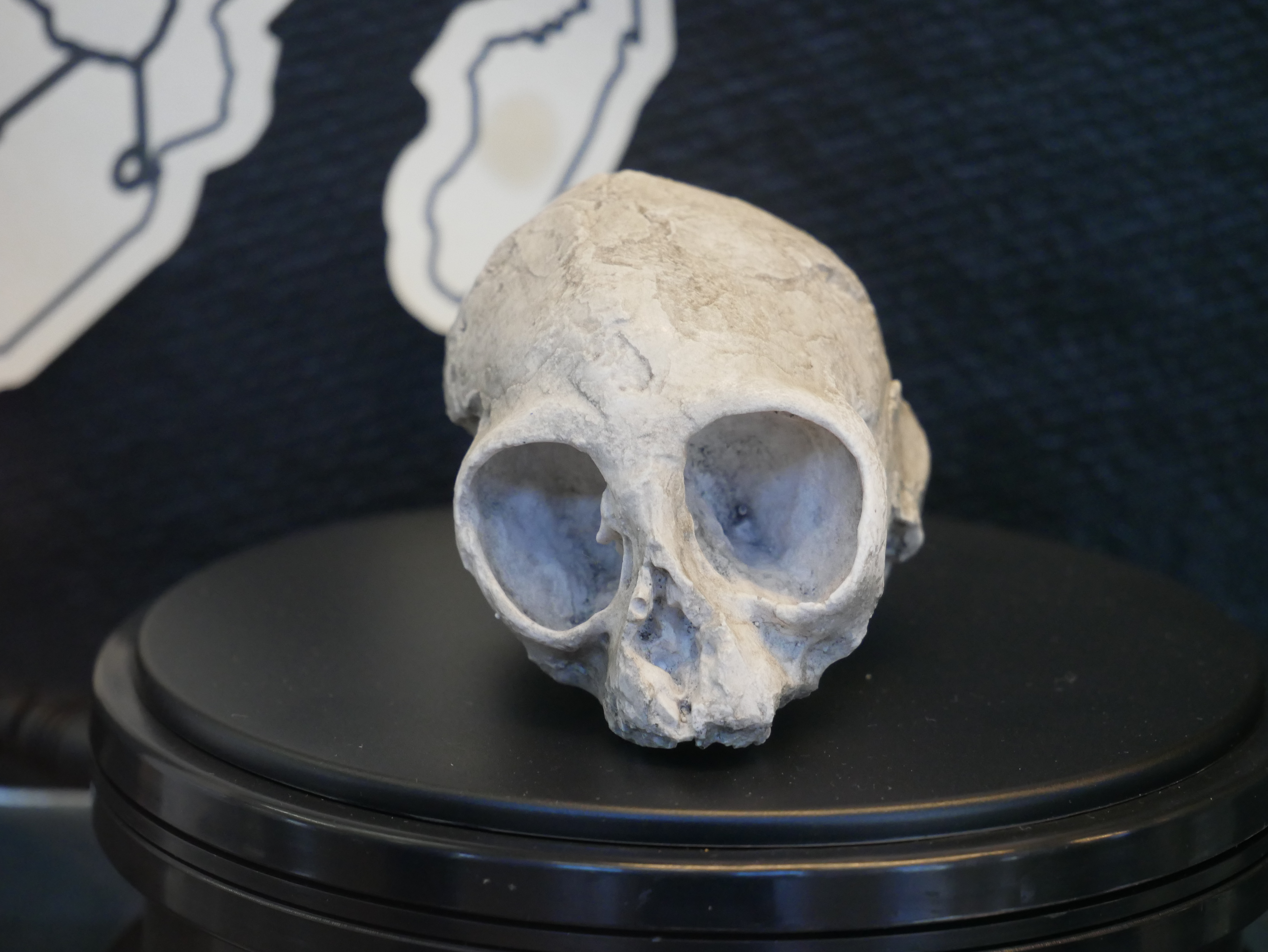
- Skull of Nyanzapithecus, the type genus.

Scientific classification
- Kingdom: Animalia
- Phylum: Chordata
- Class: Mammalia
- Order: Primates
- Superfamily: Hominoidea
- Family: †Dendropithecidae
- Subfamily: †Nyanzapithecinae; Harrison, 1999/2002

Genera
- †Rangwapithecus †Turkanapithecus †Rukwapithecus †Oreopithecus? †Nyanzapithecus

= Nyanzapithecinae =

Nyanzapithecinae Temporal range: 27–7 Ma

Extinct subfamily of mammals

The Nyanzapithecinae or Nyanzapithecines are a subfamily of extinct Dendropithecidae as sister of Simiolus. The group contains Rangwapithecus, Turkanapithecus, Rukwapithecus, Oreopithecus, and Nyanzapithecus. In the following tree the internal structure of Nyanzapithecinae of Nengo et al. is followed.

- Dendropithecidae
  - Dendropithecus
  - - Simiolus
    - Nyanzapithecinae
      - Rangwapithecus
      - - Turkanapithecus
        - - - Oreopithecus
            - Rukwapithecus
          - Nyanzapithecus

Nyanzapithecinae Harrison, 2002

- Nyanzapithecus Harrison, 1986
  - Nyanzapithecus harrisoni Kunimatsu, 1997
  - Nyanzapithecus pickfordi Harrison, 1986
  - Nyanzapithecus vancouveringorum Andrews, 1974
- Mabokopithecus von Koenigswald, 1969
  - Mabokopithecus clarki von Koenigswald, 1969
- Rangwapithecus Andrews, 1974
  - Rangwapithecus gordoni Andrews, 1974
- Turkanapithecus Leakey & Leakey, 1986
  - Turkanapithecus kalakolensis Leakey & Leakey, 1986

Nengo et al. suggest: "Nyanzapithecines were a long-lived and diverse group of Miocene hominoids that are probably close to the origin of crown hominoids."
