= Rukwapithecus =

Rukwapithecus Temporal range: 25.2–25.2 Ma

Scientific classification
- Kingdom: Animalia
- Phylum: Chordata
- Class: Mammalia
- Order: Primates
- Superfamily: Hominoidea
- Family: †Dendropithecidae
- Subfamily: †Nyanzapithecinae
- Genus: †Rukwapithecus; Stevens et al., 2013
- Species: †R. fleaglei

Binomial name
- †Rukwapithecus fleaglei Stevens et al., 2013

Extinct genus of primates

Rukwapithecus fleaglei, the only species of the genus Rukwapithecus, is a fossil primate. Known from a single lower jaw preserving four teeth, it is interpreted as the earliest hominoid, a member of the group that includes gibbons, humans, and other apes.

It is known from the Nsungwe Formation of south-western Tanzania, which dates to just over 25.2 million years ago. This area has also yielded the early Old World monkey Nsungwepithecus. Phylogenetic analysis places it within the group Nyanzapithecinae, related to Rangwapithecus and Nyanzapithecus.

== Description ==
Rukwapithecus was described in 2013 by palaeontologist Nancy J. Stevens and others, based on a right mandible (specimen RRBP 12444A) in the locality Nsungwe 2B on the Nsungwe Formation. It was estimated to have weighed 12 kg.

Its dental morphology suggests it was primarily frugivore, due to low and rounded cusps made to crush and grind fleshy fruits and soft seeds.

=== Dental morphology ===
The lower fourth premolar has an elongated crown and is implanted obliquely, with its mesial basin elevated above the longer, distolingually extended talonid basin. The lower molars increase in size posteriorly and have crenulated, subrectangular crowns with a constricted outline. The protoconid and hypoconid lie mesial to the lingual cusps, and the hypoflexid is deep, partly bordered by a prominent buccal cingulid.

A small metastylid occurs distolingual to the metaconid and is more pronounced on M2–M3. Accessory cuspules are present in the lingual notches of M2–M3, while M1–M3 have deep lingual notches, distolingual foveae, and large, buccally positioned hypoconulids. The crest between the entoconid and hypoconulid is weak or absent. M3 is particularly large and strongly crenulated, with a broad, rounded distal margin.

== Paleobiogeography ==
Rukwapithecus fleaglei is known from the Nsungwe Formation in the Rukwa Rift Basin of southwestern Tanzania, where its fossil was recovered from sediments dated to approximately 25.2 million years ago, during the late Oligocene. Its discovery provided evidence that hominoids were present in Africa by this time, alongside early cercopithecoids, represented by Nsungwepithecus gunnelli, found in the same fossil-bearing deposits. These discoveries extended the fossil record of both groups into a period previously poorly represented by African primate fossils.

Phylogenetic analyses placed Rukwapithecus among stem hominoids, suggesting that the evolutionary split between Hominoidea (apes) and Cercopithecoidea (Old World monkeys) had already occurred by its time. Its age is consistent with molecular estimates placing this divergence at approximately 25–30 million years ago, although some uncertainty remains regarding the precise relationships of early catarrhines.

The authors also proposed that previously unrecognized tectonic activity and associated changes in the East African landscape may have influenced catarrhine diversification.

== Etymology ==
The genus name is derived from two words: "Rukwa", referencing the Rukwa Rift Basin from which the specimen was found, and "Pithecus", which comes from the Greek "Píthēkos", meaning "monkey". The epithet "fleaglei" honors John G. Fleagle, for his contributions to the study of primates.
