= Maboko Island =

Island in Kenya

Coordinates: 00°09′50″S 34°36′35″E

- Interactive map of Maboko Island

Geography
- Location: Lake Victoria
- Length: 1.8 km (1.12 mi)
- Width: 1 km (0.6 mi)

Administration
- Kenya

Maboko Island is a small island lying in the Winam Gulf of Lake Victoria, in Nyanza Province of western Kenya. It is about 1.8 km long by 1 km wide. It is an important Middle Miocene paleontological site with fossiliferous deposits that were discovered in the 1930s. The age of the deposits is estimated to be 15 to 16 million years, and they are especially important for the abundance of primate fossils they contain.

== Excavations ==
Miocene fossils in the fluvial deposits of Maboko was first discovered by Archdeacon W.E. Owen in 1933, who started an excavation later that year which yielded a lot of vertebrate fossils. Owen's excavations continued the following two years supervised by Donald Gordon MacInnes. Then few expeditions visited the island before MacInnes returned together with Louis Leakey in 1947. These excavations resulted in a large number of craniodental (crania and teeth) remains of a medium seized cercopithecoid monkey and cranial and postcranial remains of a large anthropoid ape — later to become the holotypes Victoriapithecus macinnesi and Sivapithecus africanus.

Leakey and D.M.S. Watson returned to Maboko in 1949 to collect a large amount of specimen, including an isolated molar later attributed to Limnopithecus legetet. Leakey returned again in 1951 and found fossils of new holotypes: Victoriapithecus leakeyi, Mabokopithecus clarki, and Nyanzapithecus pickfordi.

An expedition in 1973 led by D.R. Pilbeam resulted in over 80 primate specimen. Most of them could be attributed to Victoriapithecus but some were assigned to new species. In 1982 and 1983, Martin Pickford searched the deposit dumps left by Owen in 1933 and by Leakey in 1949 and unveiled over 500 isolated specimen of at least five antropoid primates, later assigned to Kenyapithecus africanus. Mabokopithecus clarki, Micropithecus, Victoriapithecus macinnesi, and Nyanzapithecus pickfordi.

Other fossils collected on Maboko include:

- Mammals
  - Mole rat: Bathyergidae indet.
  - Hedgehog: Erinaceidae
  - Hyrax: Megalohyrax
  - Chalicothere: Chalicotheriidae indet.
  - Giraffe: Palaeotragus
  - Antelope: Eotragus
  - Gazelle: Gazella
- Reptiles
  - Crocodile: Crocodylus
  - Sideneck turtle: Pelusios
  - Softshell turtle: Trionyx
- Birds
  - Heron: Ardeidae indet.
  - Bustard: Otididae indet.
  - Crane: Gruidae indet.
  - Stone-curlew: Burhinidae indet.
- Other:
  - Land snail: Urocyclidae indet.

== See also ==
- Mfangano Island
- Rusinga Island
