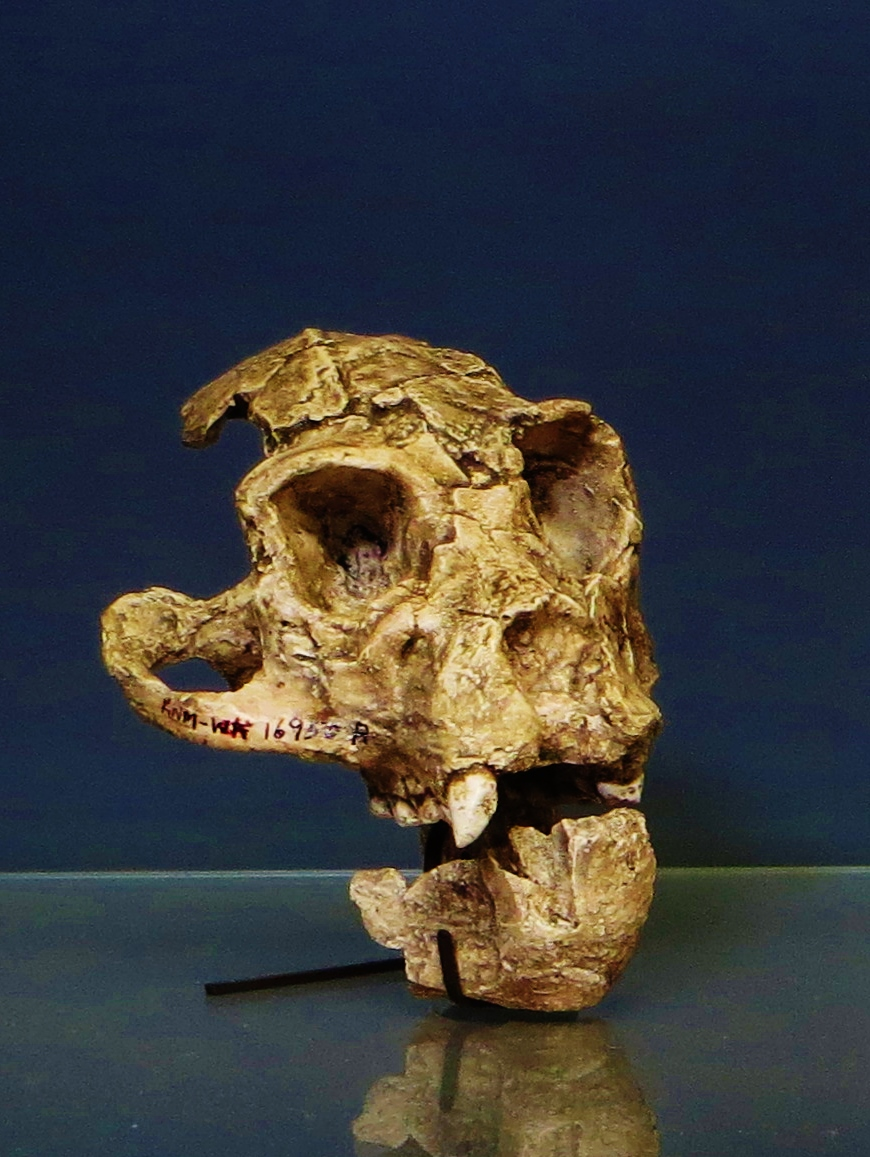
- Skull of Turkanapithecus kalakolensis at the Muséum national d'histoire naturelle, Paris

Scientific classification
- Kingdom: Animalia
- Phylum: Chordata
- Class: Mammalia
- Order: Primates
- Superfamily: Hominoidea
- Family: †Dendropithecidae
- Subfamily: †Nyanzapithecinae
- Genus: †Turkanapithecus; Leakey & Leakey, 1986

Type species
- †Turkanapithecus kalakolensis

Species
- †T. kalakolensis; †T. rusingensis

= Turkanapithecus =

Turkanapithecus Temporal range: Early Miocene, 20.4-16.0 Ma

Extinct genus of primates

Turkanapithecus is an extinct genus of hominoid primates from the Early Miocene of northern Kenya. The genus is known from the Lothidok Formation in the Turkana Basin, particularly the Kalodirr and Moruorot site complexes. It has two species, †Turkanapithecus kalakolensis and †Turkanapithecus rusingensis.

== Description ==
Turkanapithecus was a medium-sized early Miocene hominoid. The type specimen preserves a partial cranium and mandible, while associated postcranial elements were probably associated with the same individual. Two additional specimens were also described in the study of the species' morphology.

The original description recognized Turkanapithecus as distinct from previously reported genera of Miocene hominoids. Its relationship to other known hominoids was considered unclear at the time of its description.

Additional fossil material described by Rossie and Cote in 2022 included a new mandible and an isolated lower molar of T. kalakolensis from the Kalodirr Site Complex. The specimens further clarified the lower molar morphology of the species and allowed the identification of KNM-MO 1 as a mandible of T. kalakolensis.

=== Features ===
The cranium of Turkanapithecus kalakolensis had a short and low face with a distinct, domed snout. The nasal aperture was broad and ovoid, while the orbits were subcircular and separated by a broad interorbital region. The anterior root of the zygomatic arch was positioned relatively low, near the level of the alveolar margin.

== Taxonomy ==
Turkanapithecus was described by Richard E. Leakey and Meave G. Leakey in 1986 from the Early Miocene of northern Kenya. The original description established T. kalakolensis as a new genus and species of medium-sized ape, but its relationships to other Miocene hominoids were considered uncertain.

A second species, T. rusingensis, was subsequently described by Pickford et al. in 2010. Later assessments included the species within Turkanapithecus alongside T. kalakolensis and recognized material from several Early Miocene localities in Kenya and Uganda.

Later work has identified Turkanapithecus as a member of the nyanzapithecines. Rossie and Cote found in 2022 that the additional lower molar material strengthened the identification of T. kalakolensis as a nyanzapithecine.

The higher-level phylogeny of Miocene apes remains subject to discussion because of the sparse fossil record, homoplasy, and incomplete preservation.

== Species ==
=== Turkanapithecus kalakolensis ===
†Turkanapithecus kalakolensis is the species on which the genus Turkanapithecus is based. It was described by Richard E. Leakey and Meave G. Leakey in 1986 from the Early Miocene of northern Kenya.

The type specimen preserves a partial cranium and mandible, with additional postcranial elements probably associated with it. Two additional specimens were included in the morphological study published by Leakey, Leakey, and Walker in 1988.

Additional material assigned to T. kalakolensis was described by Rossie and Cote in 2022. Their study included a new mandible and an isolated lower third molar from Kalodirr and reassigned KNM-MO 1 as a mandible of the species.

=== Turkanapithecus rusingensis ===
†Turkanapithecus rusingensis was established as a second species of Turkanapithecus by Pickford et al. in 2010. The species is represented by several fragmentary specimens from the Early Miocene of East Africa, with material recorded from Rusinga and Mfwangano, Songhor, Napak, and Kipsaraman.

The present hypodigm is therefore geographically broader than that of T. kalakolensis, which was originally reported from Kalodirr in northern Kenya. Its occurrence at several Early Miocene localities provides evidence that Turkanapithecus had a wider distribution in East Africa than was indicated by the original material of T. kalakolensis.

== Paleobiology ==
Turkanapithecus has an estimated body mass of approximately 10 kg. It has been interpreted as an arboreal quadruped, with locomotor behaviour generally similar to that of Proconsul but with greater specialization for climbing.

Turkanapithecus is generally classified among the nyanzapithecines, a group characterized by distinctive cheek teeth that have been interpreted as adaptations for folivory. This suggests that leaves may have formed an important part of the diet of T. kalakolensis, although the precise dietary composition of the species is uncertain.

== Paleoecology ==
Turkanapithecus is known from the Kalodirr and Moruorot Site Complexes of the Lothidok Formation. At Moruorot, Turkanapithecus and other Early Miocene apes were preserved in humid alluvial fan complexes. Paleovegetation proxies indicate that C_{3} plants were present in a forested ecosystem, with estimated mean annual precipitation of 1700–1900 mm and strongly seasonal rainfall.
