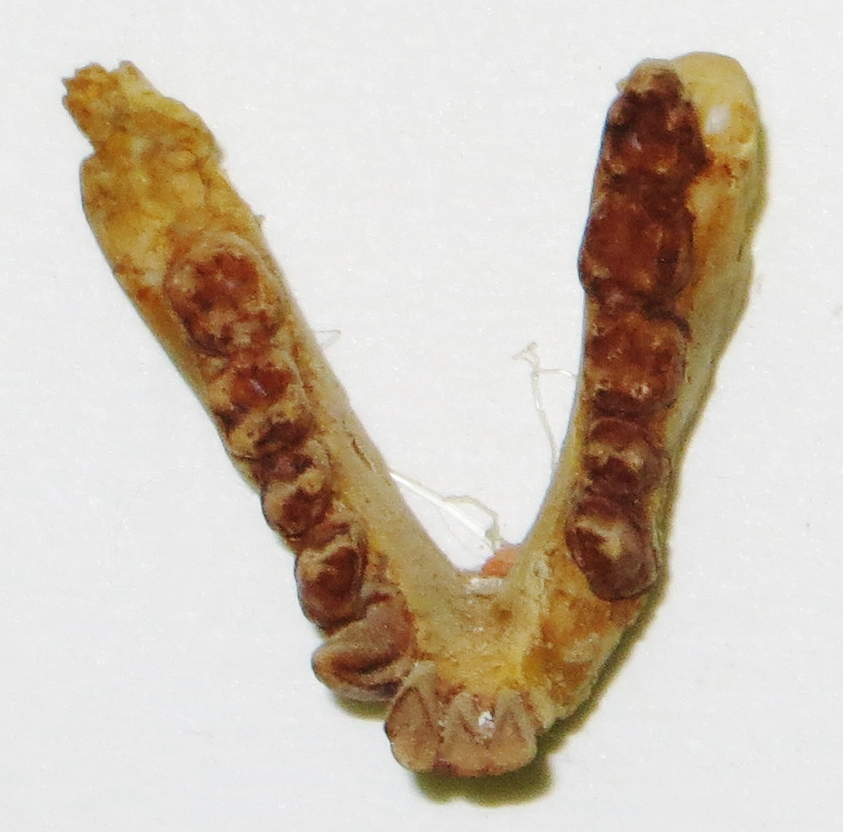
- Propliopithecus haeckeli

Scientific classification
- Kingdom: Animalia
- Phylum: Chordata
- Class: Mammalia
- Order: Primates
- Suborder: Haplorhini
- Infraorder: Simiiformes
- Parvorder: Catarrhini
- Superfamily: †Propliopithecoidea

= Propliopithecoidea =

Propliopithecoidea Temporal range: Early Oligocene

Extinct superfamily of primates

Propliopithecoidea is a superfamily of catarrhine primates that inhabited Africa and the Arabian Peninsula during the Early Oligocene about 32 to 29 million years ago. Fossils have been found in Egypt, Oman and Angola. They are one of the earliest known families of catarrhines. They have a number of features in common with extant catarrhines, but also features that are primitive and not found in later catarrhine families.

There are five species, which are close enough to be often viewed as all belonging to a single genus. They have a body mass of 4–8 kg (8.8–17.6 lb), similar in size to modern howler monkeys.

== Species ==
Propliopithecus ankelae
Propliopithecus chirobates
Propliopithecus haeckeli
Propliopithecus markgrafi a.k.a. Moeripithecus markgrafi
Propliopithecus zeuxis a.k.a. Aegyptopithecus zeuxis

== Classification ==
Szalay & Delson (1979), Andrews (1985), Harrison (1987) and Begun (2012) argued that the high degree of similarity means that all the propliopithecoids should be placed in a single genus. Herbert Thomas (1991), following examination of new material in Oman, argued for Moeripithecus markgrafi, citing 'striking differences in morphology' compared to P. haeckeli. Seiffert (2006) suggested that the fossils examined by Thomas might be better classified as P. ankeli. Seiffert et al. (2010) argued for three genera - Aegyptopithecus, Moeripithecus and Propliopithecus An additional fossil, an unnamed propliopithecid from Taqah, appears more basal, and as such not be part of a Propliopithecus sensu stricto clade.
