= Nsungwepithecus =

Nsungwepithecus Temporal range: 25.2–25.2 Ma

Scientific classification
- Domain: Eukaryota
- Kingdom: Animalia
- Phylum: Chordata
- Class: Mammalia
- Order: Primates
- Suborder: Haplorhini
- Infraorder: Simiiformes
- Parvorder: Catarrhini
- Superfamily: Cercopithecoidea
- Genus: †Nsungwepithecus; Stevens et al., 2013
- Species: †N. gunnelli

Binomial name
- †Nsungwepithecus gunnelli Stevens et al., 2013

Extinct genus of primates

Nsungwepithecus gunnelli, the only species of the genus Nsungwepithecus, is a fossil primate. Known from a single piece of lower jaw preserving the third molar, it is believed to be the member of the Old World monkey group. It is known from the Nsungwe Formation of southwestern Tanzania, which dates to just over 25.2 million years ago. This area has also yielded the early hominoid Rukwapithecus.
