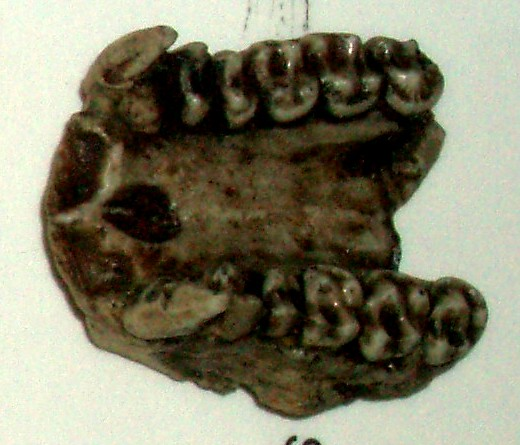
- Dentition of Dendropithecus macinnesi

Scientific classification
- Kingdom: Animalia
- Phylum: Chordata
- Class: Mammalia
- Order: Primates
- Infraorder: Simiiformes
- Parvorder: Catarrhini
- Superfamily: Hominoidea
- Family: †Dendropithecidae; Harrison, 2002

Genera
- †Dendropithecus †Simiolus †Nyanzapithecinae †Micropithecus

= Dendropithecidae =

Dendropithecidae Temporal range: 27–7 Ma

Extinct family of primates

The family Dendropithecidae is an extinct family of catarrhine apes. They date from the Early Miocene, around 20-12 million years ago.

Fossils of the two Dendropithecus species, Dendropithecus macinnesi and Dendropithecus ugandensis, have been found in East Africa, including several partial skeletons of Dendropithecus macinnesi on Rusinga Island in Lake Victoria. Other species are Simiolus andrewsi, Simiolus cheptumoae, Simiolus enjiessi.

Micropithecus clarki and Micropithecus leakeyorum may not be part Dendropithecidae, and may be sister to the crown Catarrhini (or, depending on the definition, the apes and the Cercopithecidae may have emerged in the Dendropithecidae).

The later Nyanzapithecinae (including Oreopithecus († 7 Ma)) appear to be sister to Simiolus.

== Description ==
The taxa included in Dendropithecidae possess various traits, These include:

upper and lower canines strongly bilaterally compressed, a P_{3} moderately to strongly specialized for sectoriality, slender limb bones, a humerus with a relatively straight shaft, a large and medially directed medial epicondyle of the humerus, a well-developed epitrochlear fossa, a broad and shallow zona conoidea, minimal spooling of the trochlear articular surface, and a shallow olecranon fossa.

Micropithecus appears to be sister to the crown catarrhini.

=== Locomotion ===
The postcranial anatomy of Dendropithecus macinnesi has been used to investigate the locomotor adaptations of early Miocene catarrhines. Its limb bones have been interpreted as evidence of arboreal locomotion, including suspensory behaviour. The anatomy of Dendropithecus has also been compared with that of early hominoids and living gibbons, although similarities in locomotion do not necessarily indicate a close evolutionary relationship.

== Classification and phylogeny ==
The evolutionary relationships among early Miocene catarrhines remain debated. The classification proposed by Harrison in 2002 grouped several primitive catarrhines within Dendropithecidae, but the placement of individual genera has varied between analyses.

The position of Micropithecus is uncertain. Rasmussen et al. (2019) discussed the relationships of primitive catarrhines in the context of the evolution of Old World monkeys and noted that the placement of these early taxa affects interpretations of catarrhine evolution. The relationship between Simiolus and Nyanzapithecinae has also been considered in studies of Miocene primate diversity.

- Crown Catarrhini
  - Cercopithecoidea
  - Hominoidea
    - Dendropithecidae
      - Dendropithecus
      - - Simiolus
        - Nyanzapithecinae
          - Turkanapithecus
          - - Rangwapithecus
            - - - Oreopithecus
                - Rukwapithecus
              - Nyanzapithecus
    - advanced Hominoidea
