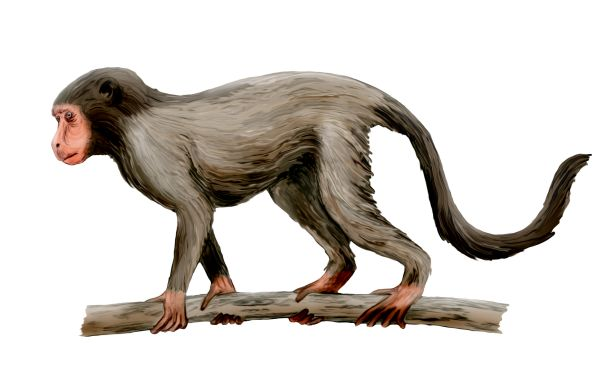

Scientific classification
- Kingdom: Animalia
- Phylum: Chordata
- Class: Mammalia
- Order: Primates
- Suborder: Haplorhini
- Superfamily: †Propliopithecoidea
- Family: †Propliopithecidae
- Genus: †Aegyptopithecus; Simons, 1965
- Species: †A. zeuxis

Binomial name
- †Aegyptopithecus zeuxis Simons, 1965

= Aegyptopithecus =

Aegyptopithecus Temporal range: Oligocene ~38–29.5 Ma

Extinct single-species genus of primate

Aegyptopithecus ("Egyptian ape", from Greek Αίγυπτος "Egypt" and πίθηκος "ape") is an early fossil catarrhine that predates the divergence between hominoids (apes) and cercopithecids (Old World monkeys). It is known from a single species, Aegyptopithecus zeuxis, which lived around 38-29.5 million years ago in the early part of the Oligocene epoch. It likely resembled modern-day New World monkeys, and was about the same size as a modern howler monkey, which is about 56 to 92 cm (22 to 36 in) long. Aegyptopithecus fossils have been found in the Jebel Qatrani Formation of modern-day Egypt. Aegyptopithecus is believed to be a stem-catarrhine, a crucial link between Eocene and Miocene fossils.

Aegyptopithecus zeuxis has become one of the best known extinct primates based on craniodental and postcranial remains.

== Discovery, age and taxonomy ==
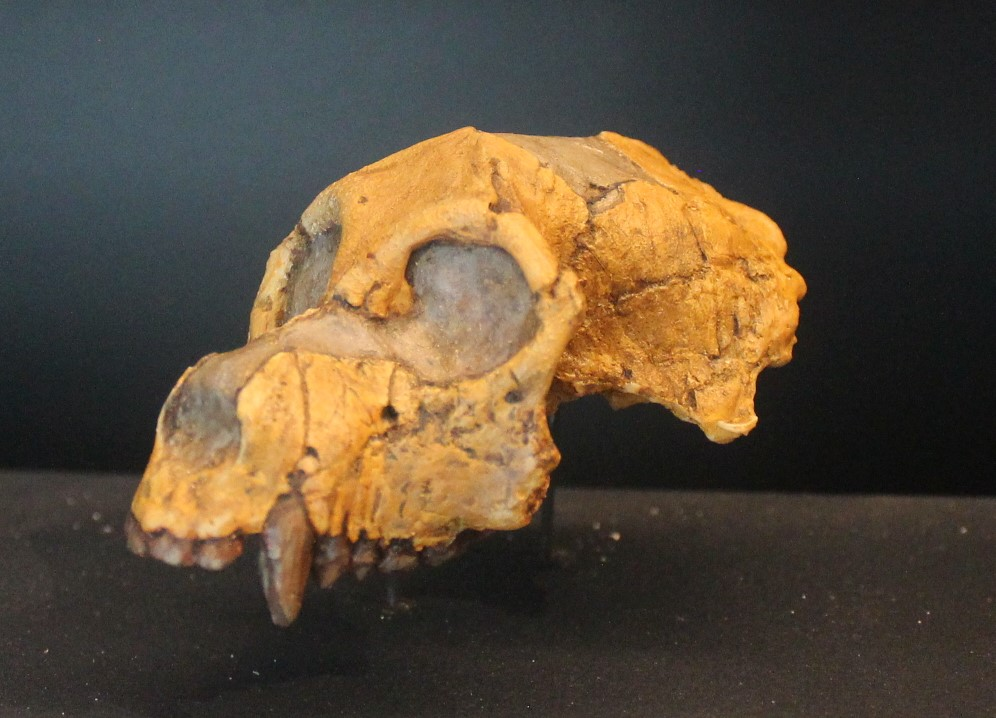
Aegyptopithecus skull

Aegyptopithecus was discovered by Elwyn Simons in 1966 in the Gabal Qatrani Formation, located in the Faiyum Governorate of central Egypt. Aegyptopithecus zeuxis fossils were originally thought to be between 35.4 and 33.3 million years old, based on initial analysis of the formation in which they were found. However, analysis by Erik Seiffert in 2006 concluded that the age of the Gabal Qatrani Formation should be revised. His assessment of more recent evidence indicates an age of between 30.2 and 29.5 million years ago.

If Aegyptopithecus is placed in its own genus, then there is one documented species named A. zeuxis. The type specimen for the species is CGM26901. Its scientific name means "linking Egyptian ape".

There is controversy over whether or not Aegyptopithecus should be a genus on its own or whether it should be moved into the genus Propliopithecus.

== Morphology ==
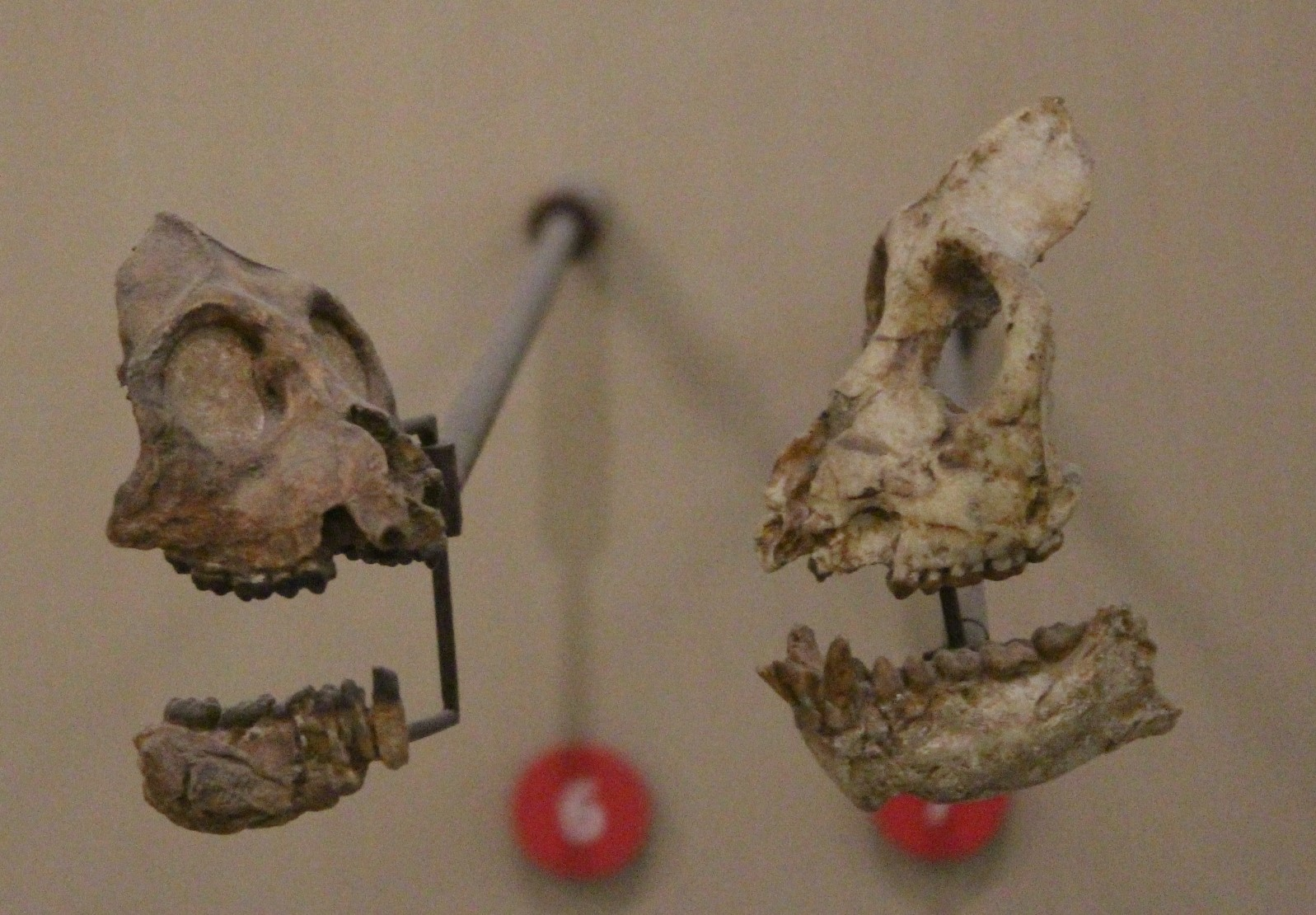
Male and female skulls (AMNH 129172/3/4/5) of A. zeuxis

Aegyptopithecus zeuxis was a species that had a dental formula of 2.1.2.32.1.2.3, with the lower molars increasing in size posteriorly. The molars showed an adaptation called compartmentalizing shear, which is where the cutting edges involved in the buccal phase serve to surround basins in such a way that food is cut into fragments that are trapped and then ground during the lingual phase.

The canines of this species were sexually dimorphic. The ascending mandibular ramus of this species is relatively broad. The orbits are dorsally oriented and relatively small which suggested that this was a diurnal species. This species showed some postorbital constriction. The interorbital distance of Aegyptopithecus zeuxis is large much like that found in colobines. A sagittal crest developed in older individuals and extends over the brow ridges. This species had an auditory region which is similar to that found in platyrrhines, having no bony tube and the tympanic fused to the lateral surface of the bulla.

The humerus has a head which faces posteriorly and is narrower than primates that practice suspensory behavior. The humerus also shares some features with extinct hominoids: a large medial epicondyle and a comparatively wide trochlea. This species had an ulna that compares to the extinct members of the genus Alouatta. On the foot bones, this species had a grasping hallux. Aegyptopithecus zeuxis shares characteristics with haplorrhines such as a fused mandibular and frontal symphyses, postorbital closure, and superior and inferior transverse tori.

Based on dental dimensions and femoral remains the body mass of A. zeuxis is estimated to be 6.708 kg. The functional length of the femur is estimated to be 150 mm, which is larger than Cebus apella and smaller than Alouatta seniculus.

=== Brain size ===
In Egypt's Fayum Depression a subadult female cranium, CGM 85785, was discovered by Rajeev Patnaik. This specimen's cranial capacity was found to be 14.63 cm^{3} and reanalysis of a male endocast (CGM 40237) estimates a cranial capacity of 21.8 cm^{3}. These estimates dispel earlier ones of approximately 30 cm^{3}. These measurements give an estimated male to female endocranial ratio of approximately 1.5, indicating A. zeuxis to be a dimorphic species.

The olfactory bulb to endocranial volume ratio is considered to be on the lower end of the strepsirrhine spectrum, perhaps as a result of the organism's rostrum. In relation to other anthropoids, the frontal lobes of A. zeuxis are considered to be rather small but the olfactory bulbs are not considered to be small when taking into account the body size of A. zeuxis. Overall, the brain to body weight ratio of A. zeuxis is considered to be strepsirrhine-like and perhaps even non-primate like.

== Behaviour ==
Aegyptopithecus zeuxis is thought to have been sexually dimorphic. Tooth size, craniofacial morphology, brain size, and body mass all indicate this. Due to A. zeuxis being sexually dimorphic, the social structure is thought to have been polygynous with intense competition for females.

=== Locomotion ===
Three femoral remains were found in Quarry I (DPC 5262 and 8709) and Quarry M (DPC 2480). Paleomagnetic dating puts the sites at 33 Ma, consistent with the Oligocene epoch. Based on the estimated femoral neck angle (120-130 degrees) the femur is similar to that of a quadrupedal anthropoid. The greater trochanter's morphology is inconsistent with that of leaping primates, serving as further evidence of the animal's quadrupedalism.

Aegyptopithecus is thought to have been an arboreal quadruped due to the distal articular region of the femur, which is deeper than that of "later" catarrhines. Also, based on overall femoral morphology, A. zeuxis is thought to have been robust. The phalanges of the hands and feet suggest powerful grasping consistent with arboreal quadrupedalism.

The humerus also suggests arboreal quadrupedalism. This is based on the pronounced brachialis flange and stabilizing muscles on brachial flexors rather than extensors. In addition, the ulna and distal articular surface of the humerus indicate that A. zeuxis was not only an arboreal quadruped, but also large and slow.

=== Diet ===
Studies in dental microwear and microsutures focusing on its molars, suggest that Aegyptopithecus was probably a frugivore. It is also possible that Aegyptopithecus ate hard objects on occasion. However, the rate of tooth chipping in Aegyptopithecus was very low, and this line of evidence indicates that it seldom consumed hard objects.

== Habitat ==
Aegyptopithecus lived in the Fayum area of northern Egypt. Today, this area is semiarid and lacking in vegetation. At the time of Aegyptopithecus' existence, the Oligocene, this area was heavily vegetated, subtropical, had many trees and had seasonal rainfall.
