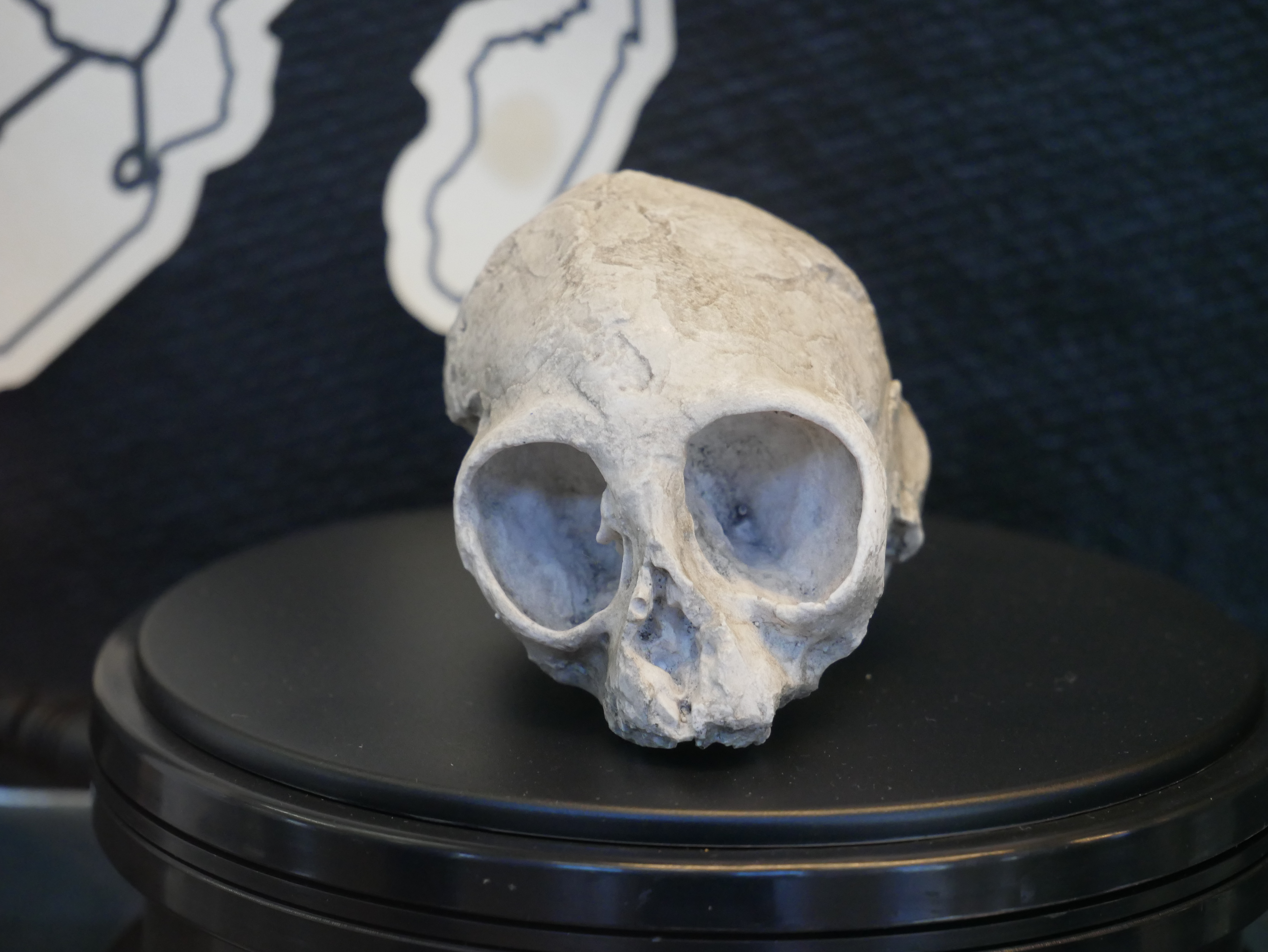
- Skull of N. pickfordi

Scientific classification
- Kingdom: Animalia
- Phylum: Chordata
- Class: Mammalia
- Order: Primates
- Superfamily: Hominoidea
- Family: †Dendropithecidae
- Subfamily: †Nyanzapithecinae
- Genus: †Nyanzapithecus; Harrison 1986

Type species
- Nyanzapithecus pickfordi Harrison 1986

Other species
- †N. vancouveringorum (Andrews, 1974); †N. harrisoni Kunimatsu, 1997; †N. alesi Nengo et al., 2017

= Nyanzapithecus =

Nyanzapithecus Temporal range: Middle Miocene

Extinct genus of mammal

Nyanzapithecus is an extinct genus of primate from the Middle Miocene of Maboko Island, Nyanza Province, Kenya. This genus is known from four species. It had an average body mass of around 10 kg (22 lb).

== Taxonomy ==
Fifteen cranio-dental specimens of this species were collected from the island between the years 1933-73.

During an expedition to Maboko Island in 1982–83, paleoanthropologist Martin Pickford recovered more than a hundred small catarrhine fossils. Among them, Harrison 1986 described the new genus and species Nyanzapithecus pickfordi, characterized by several dental specializations, and also transferred the Rangwapithecus species R. vancouveringi to the genus renaming it N. vancouveringorum. Nyanzapithecus was considered closely related to Rangwapithecus and Mabokopithecus based on dental similarities, and an early relative of Oreopithecus bambolii. Nyanzapithecus was originally included in Oreopithecidae before being transferred to Proconsulidae. Kunimatsu 1997 described a new species, N. harrisoni, from Nachola, Kenya.

Benefit et al. 1998 considered Mabokopithecus clarki congeneric and even conspecific with N. pickfordi and thus renamed the latter Mabokopithecus pickfordi/clarki and Kunimatsu's species M. harrisoni.

== Dental morphology ==
Nyanzapithecus pickfordi has a dental formula of 2:1:2:3 on both the upper and lower jaw. The upper premolars were long and had buccal and lingual cusps which resembled each other in size the lower molars had deep notches. Based upon dental morphology this was a folivorous species.
