= Simiolus =

Simiolus Temporal range: Miocene

Scientific classification
- Kingdom: Animalia
- Phylum: Chordata
- Class: Mammalia
- Order: Primates
- Suborder: Haplorhini
- Family: †Dendropithecidae
- Genus: †Simiolus; Leakey & Leakey, 1987

Extinct genus of primates

Simiolus is an extinct genus of dendropithecid primates. It was described by Mary Leakey and Richard Leakey in 1987, and the type species is S. enjiessi, which existed during the Miocene of Kenya. The species epithet is a phonetic pun on the acronym NGS. A new species, S. andrewsi, also from the middle Miocene of Kenya, was described by Terry Harrison in 2010. In November 2018, scientists reported the discovery of the smallest known ape, Simiolus minutus, which weighed approximately 8 lb (3.6 kg), and lived about 12.5 million years ago in Kenya in East Africa.

== Species ==
- Simiolus enjiessi Leakey & Leakey, 1987
- Simiolus leakeyorum (Note: Based on new material found on Maboko Island, Kenya, it has been argued that the taxon presently referred to as Micropithecus leakeyorum should be transferred to the genus Simiolus. However, a full analysis of this material has not yet been published. As such, most of the published material that would belong to Simiolus leakeyorum is referred to in the literature as Micropithecus leakeyorum)
- Simiolus cheptumoae Pickford & Kunimatsu, 2005
- Simiolus andrewsi Harrison, 2010
- Simiolus minutus Rossie & Hill, 2018
