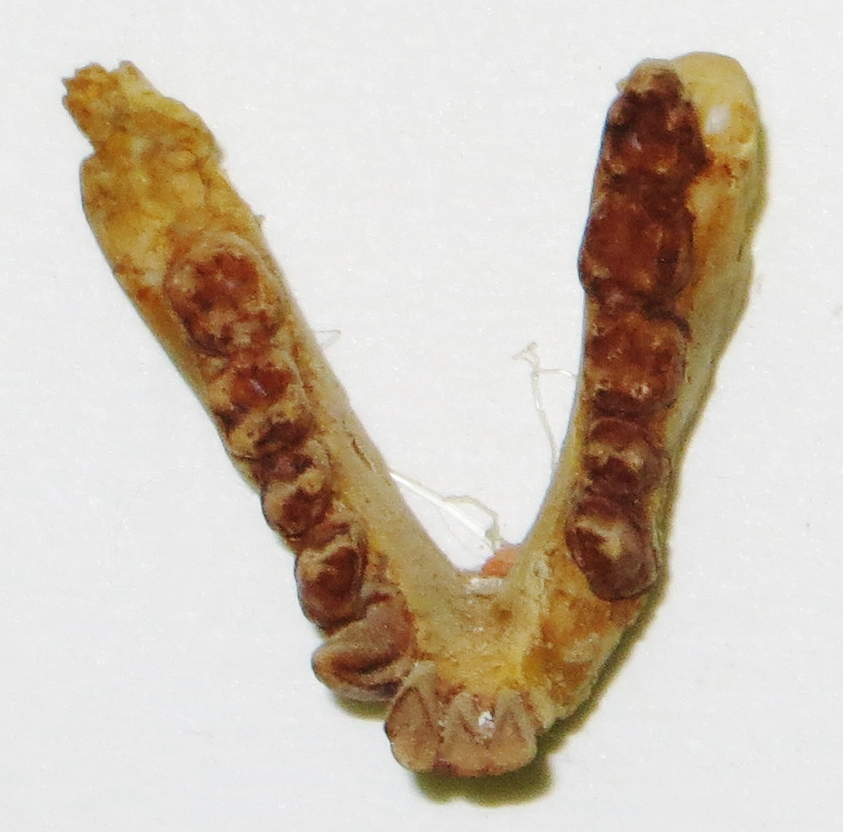
- Propliopithecus haeckeli

Scientific classification
- Kingdom: Animalia
- Phylum: Chordata
- Class: Mammalia
- Order: Primates
- Suborder: Haplorhini
- Superfamily: †Propliopithecoidea
- Family: †Propliopithecidae
- Genus: †Propliopithecus; Schlosser, 1910

Type species
- †Propliopithecus haeckeli Schlosser 1911

Species
- †Propliopithecus ankeli Simons et al. 1987; †Propliopithecus chirobates Simons 1965; †Propliopithecus haeckeli Schlosser 1911

Synonyms
- †Aeolopithecus Simons 1965; †Moeripithecus Schlosser 1910

= Propliopithecus =

Propliopithecus Temporal range: Paleogene–Neogene

Extinct genus of primates

Propliopithecus is an extinct genus of primate.

The 40 cm (1 ft 4 in) long creature resembled today's gibbons. Its eyes faced forwards, giving it stereoscopic vision. Propliopithecus was most likely an omnivore. It is possible that Propliopithecus is the same creature as Aegyptopithecus. If that would be the case the name Propliopithecus would take precedence over Aegyptopithecus according to ICZN rules, because it was coined earlier.

== Human-like dental features ==
Propliopithecus had small canine teeth, lacked spaces to fit the canine teeth of the other jaw into, and had molars very similar to those of Australopithecus. These features set Propliopithecus apart from Aegyptopithecus, which had big canine teeth along with other more normal simian dental features.

== Palaeobiology ==
=== Palaeoecology ===
The low rates of tooth chipping in Propliopithecus suggests that it did not regularly consume hard foods. Multiple instances of dental caries are known from P. chirobates, suggesting it ate a diet of soft and sweet fruits.
