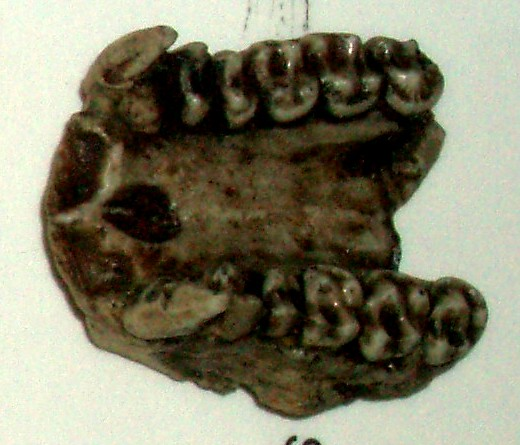
- Dendropithecus macinnesi jaw

Scientific classification
- Kingdom: Animalia
- Phylum: Chordata
- Class: Mammalia
- Order: Primates
- Superfamily: Hominoidea
- Family: †Dendropithecidae
- Genus: †Dendropithecus; Andrews and Simons, 1977

Species
- D. macinnesi (Clark and Leakey, 1950) (type species); D. ugandensis (Pickford et al., 2010)

= Dendropithecus =

Dendropithecus Temporal range: 20–15 Ma

Extinct genus of primates

Dendropithecus is an extinct genus of apes native to East Africa between 20 and 15 million years ago. Dendropithecus was originally suggested to be related to modern gibbons, based primarily on similarities in size, dentition, and skeletal adaptations. However, further studies have shown that Dendropithecus lacks derived hominoid traits. Instead, the traits shared between this taxon and modern primates are primitive for all catarrhines. Dendropithecus is now considered to be a stem catarrhine, too primitive to be closely related to any modern primates.

== Description ==
Dendropithecus was a slender ape, about 60 centimetres (2.0 ft) in body length. The structure of its arms suggest that it would have been able to brachiate, swinging between trees by its arms, but that it would not have been as efficient at this form of movement as modern gibbons. However, its teeth suggest a very gibbon-like diet, likely consisting of fruit, soft leaves and flowers. Dental microwear of Dendropithecus suggests that it was a generalist frugivore that had the ability to fall back on folivory if necessary.

== Species ==
Dendropithecus macinnesi was originally described as a new species of Limnopithecus, L. macinnesi, in 1950, before it was recognized as a distinct genus in 1977. D. ugandensis, known primarily from material from Napak, Uganda, is morphologically similar to D. macinnesi, but is 15-20% smaller than the type species. An additional species, D. orientalis, was described in 1990 from middle Miocene deposits in northern Thailand, but was transferred to the pliopithecid genus Dionysopithecus in 1999.
