= Limnopithecus =

Limnopithecus Temporal range: Early Miocene

Scientific classification
- Kingdom: Animalia
- Phylum: Chordata
- Class: Mammalia
- Order: Primates
- Superfamily: Hominoidea
- Family: †Dendropithecidae
- Genus: †Limnopithecus; Hopwood, 1933

Type species
- †Limnopithecus legetet

Other species
- †L. evansi

Extinct genus of primates

Limnopithecus is an extinct genus of small-bodied catarrhine primates from the Early Miocene of East Africa. Fossils attributed to the genus are known from several early Miocene sites in Kenya and Uganda, including Koru, Legetet, Chamtwara, Rusinga, Songhor, Napak, and Bukwo.

== Description ==
Limnopithecus was a small-bodied catarrhine with distinctive features of the upper dentition and maxillary region. The genus is characterized by a unique morphology of the upper second incisor (I²), as well as a broad palate and distinctive premolar morphology.

The maxillary specimens attributed to L. evansi also provide information about the nasal aperture and maxillary sinuses. These features, together with the morphology and relative proportions of the premolars, distinguish L. evansi from other small-bodied early Miocene catarrhines such as Lomorupithecus harrisoni.

== Paleobiology ==
Several hypotheses concerning Limnopithecus have linked its similarity to modern gibbons and large cebids to its moderate body mass and similar locomotor habits, including possible adaptations to brachiation or semibrachiation. A biomechanical analysis of the Limnopithecus remains, however, did not produce satisfactory results for resolving these interpretations.

Comparisons of postcranial specimens of early Miocene catarrhines, including Limnopithecus, indicate that arboreal quadrupedalism was important in their positional repertoire. The compared taxa also show features interpreted as indicating a capacity for suspensory behaviour, possibly expressed in postural activities and bridging.

Dental microwear analysis of Early Miocene non-cercopithecoid catarrhines, including Limnopithecus, found no discernible variation in microwear texture among the fossil taxa examined. The results suggest that these catarrhines generally had generalist diets and were not specialized to the degree of many modern primates.

== Paleoecology ==
Limnopithecus is known from Early Miocene localities in western Kenya and Uganda, including Koru and Songhor.

Paleoecological analysis of western Kenyan Miocene sites indicates that the Songhor fauna was probably derived from a forest habitat. In the Koru area, faunas from the Legetet Formation and the Chamtwara Member of the Kapurtay Agglomerates were similarly derived from forest habitats, while the Koru Formation fauna indicates more open conditions.

== Species ==
=== Limnopithecus legetet ===
†Limnopithecus legetet is the type species of the genus and was described by Arthur Tindell Hopwood in 1933 from material discovered at Koru, Kenya.

The holotype is a partial adult mandible preserving two teeth, while the paratype is a fragmentary juvenile mandible. Additional material has subsequently been referred to the species from localities including Koru, Legetet, Chamtwara, Rusinga, and Williams Flat in Kenya, as well as Napak and Bukwa in Uganda.

The species has been included in several taxonomic revisions of the small catarrhines of the East African Early Miocene. However, the composition of the hypodigm attributed to L. legetet remains subject to discussion, particularly concerning specimens originally referred to the species after the description of its type material.

=== Limnopithecus evansi ===
†Limnopithecus evansi was described by MacInnes in 1943 from material from Songhor, western Kenya.

The species was later synonymized with L. legetet by Andrews (1978), but Harrison (1988) resurrected it as a valid species based primarily on material from Songhor.

L. evansi is known particularly well from maxillary material collected at Songhor, including two well-preserved specimens examined by Cote et al. These specimens provided new information on the upper dentition and maxillary anatomy of the species.

Cote et al. found that L. evansi shares the distinctive upper second incisor morphology present in specimens attributed to L. legetet, supporting their placement in the same genus. They also identified differences in palate and premolar morphology separating L. evansi from Lomorupithecus harrisoni.
