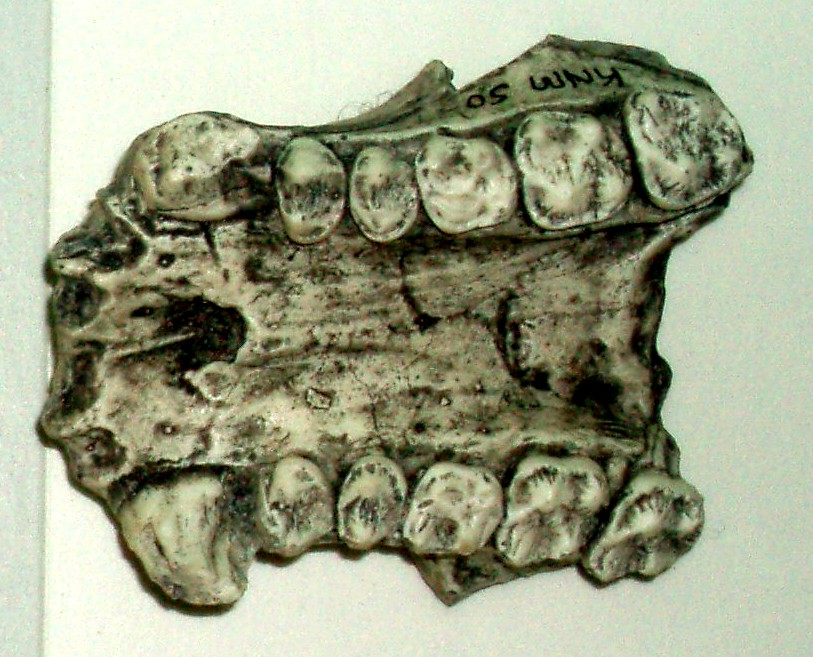
- Jaw of Rangwapithecus gordoni

Scientific classification
- Kingdom: Animalia
- Phylum: Chordata
- Class: Mammalia
- Order: Primates
- Suborder: Haplorhini
- Family: †Dendropithecidae
- Subfamily: †Nyanzapithecinae
- Genus: †Rangwapithecus; Andrews, 1974

= Rangwapithecus =

Extinct genus of primates

Rangwapithecus is an extinct genus of ape from the Early Miocene of Kenya. Late Miocene phalanges from Hungary have also been assigned to this genus, but were later reclassified as Dryopithecus.

== Description ==
Rangwapithecus weighed approximately 15 kg (33 lb) and the size and shape of the ape's teeth indicate that it was a folivore. An arboreal ape from the earliest Miocene adapted to life in the rainforest, it is associated particularly with Mfangano Island although the species previously inhabited a woodland-bushland environment.

== Taxonomy ==
Rangwapithecus was sympatric with Proconsul, and may be synonymous with both Proconsul gordoni and Proconsul vancouveringi. It is also similar to another species found in Africa. Rangwapithecus gordoni and P. africanus are similarly sized though they differ morphologically, and both are restricted to Koru and Songhur.

== Palaeoecology ==
Rangwapithecus was a generalised frugivore that was also able to engage in folivory as a fallback during times of dietary stress.
