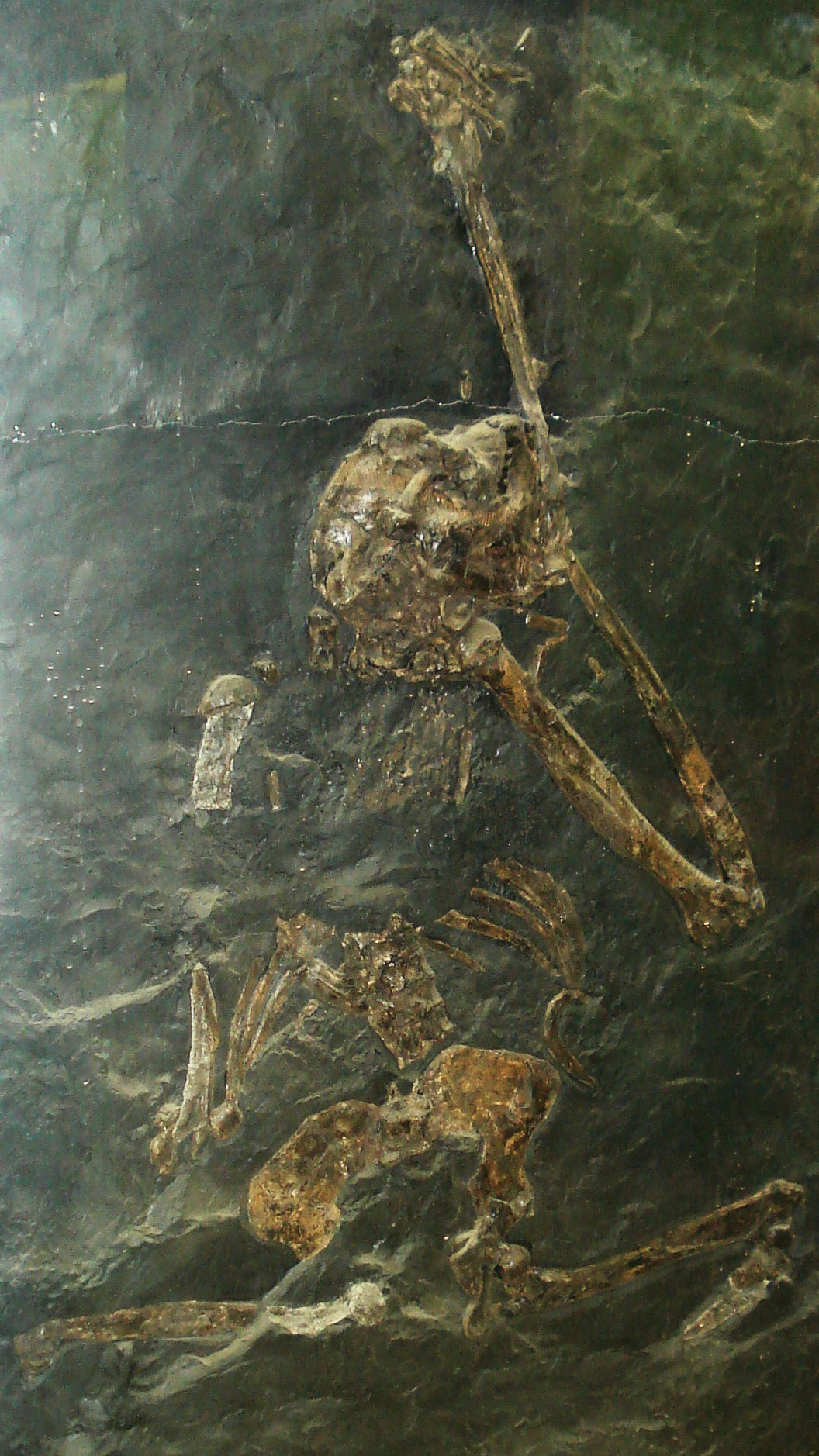
- Oreopithecus bambolii fossil

Scientific classification
- Kingdom: Animalia
- Phylum: Chordata
- Class: Mammalia
- Order: Primates
- Superfamily: Hominoidea
- Genus: †Oreopithecus; Gervais, 1872

Type species
- Oreopithecus bambolii Gervais, 1872

= Oreopithecus =

Oreopithecus Temporal range: 9–7 Million years ago

Extinct genus of hominid from the Miocene

Oreopithecus (from the Greek ὄρος, oros and πίθηκος, pithekos, meaning "hill-ape") is an extinct genus of ape from the Miocene epoch whose fossils have been found in today's Tuscany and Sardinia in Italy. It existed 9–7 million years ago in that region when it formed an isolated island in a chain of islands stretching from central Europe to northern Africa in what was becoming the Mediterranean Sea. (Note: In what remained of the Tethys Sea, or what was becoming the Mediterranean Sea; see Geology and paleoclimatology of the Mediterranean Basin; see also Messinian salinity crisis.)

Oreopithecus was one of many European immigrants that settled this area in the Vallesian–Turolian transition and one of few hominoids, together with Sivapithecus in Asia, to survive the so-called Vallesian Crisis. To date, dozens of individuals have been discovered at the Tuscan localities of Montebamboli, Montemassi, Casteani, Ribolla and, most notably, in the fossil-rich lignite mine in the Baccinello Basin, making it one of the best-represented fossil apes.

== Evolutionary history ==
Oreopithecus bambolii was first described by French paleontologist Paul Gervais in 1872, after the discovery of a juvenile mandible in a lignite mine at Montebamboli in 1862 by Tito Nardi, who donated the specimen to Professor Igino Cocchi. In 1890, nearly a dozen new specimens were reported by Guiseppe Ristori, among them an upper jaw. In 1898, a left lower jaw was described by Felice Ottolenghi. In 1907, Giuseppe Merciai reported four maxillae and a lower jaw from the Grosseto mine at Ribolla. During this period there was no consensus whether Oreopithecus was a monkey or an ape.

From 1949 onwards, Swiss paleontologist Johannes Hürzeler began to restudy the known material. In 1954, 1955, 1956, and 1958, he claimed Oreopithecus were a true hominin—based on its premolars, short jaws and reduced canines, at the time considered diagnostic of the hominin family. This hypothesis immediately became a hotly discussed topic among his fellow paleontolgists. When he toured the world to give a series of lectures, his views generated an enormous press coverage, often being presented as a challenge to the Darwinian descent of man from apes. After Hürzeler was invited to give a lecture in New York in March 1956, the Wenner-Gren Foundation decided to finance excavations in Italy, with the cooperation of the Italian paleontologist Alberto Carlo Blanc. On 2 August 1958, Hürzeler's views seemed to be confirmed when he discovered a complete skeleton in Baccinello, which in 1960 he interpreted as a biped because of the short pelvis was closer to those of hominins than those of chimpanzees and gorillas. Hominin affinities claimed for Oreopithecus remained controversial for decades until new analyses in the 1990s reasserted that Oreopithecus was directly related to Dryopithecus. The peculiar cranial and dental features were explained as consequences of insular isolation.

This new evidence confirmed that Oreopithecus was bipedal but also revealed that its peculiar form of bipedalism was much different from that of Australopithecus. The hallux formed a 100° angle with the other toes, which enabled the foot to act as a tripod in erect posture, but prevented Oreopithecus from developing a fast bipedal stride. When a land bridge broke the isolation of the Tusco-Sardinian area 6.5 million years ago, large predators such as Machairodus and Metailurus were present among the new generation of European immigrants and Oreopithecus faced quick extinction together with other endemic genera. (Note: A parallel to the Great American Interchange two million years later.) Because of the ecological versatility of O. bambolii, environmental change has not been considered a sufficient explanation for its demise; predation and competition appear to have been the most likely extinction drivers of the species.

=== Taxonomic classification ===
Known as the "enigmatic hominoid", Oreopithecus can dramatically rewrite the palaeontological map depending on whether it is a descendant of the European ape Dryopithecus or an African anthropoid. Some have suggested the unique locomotory behavior of Oreopithecus requires a revision of the current consensus on the timing of bipedality in human developmental history, but there is limited agreement on this point among paleontologists.

Simons (1960) considered Oreopithecus closely related to the early Oligocene Apidium, a small arboreal anthropoid that lived nearly 34 million years ago in Egypt. Oreopithecus shows strong links to modern apes in its postcranium and, in this respect, it is the most modern Miocene ape below the neck, with closest similarities to the postcranial elements of Dryopithecus, but its dentition is adapted to a leafy diet and a close link is uncertain. Others claim it to be either the sister taxon to Cercopithecoidea or an even direct human ancestor, but it is usually placed in its own subfamily within Hominidae. It could instead be added to the same subfamily as Dryopithecus, perhaps as a distinct tribe (Oreopithecini). A cladistic analysis of Nyanzapithecus alesi recovers Oreopithecus as a member of the proconsulid subfamily Nyanzapithecinae. A 2023 phylogenetic analysis suggested found a close relationship with gibbons, though the author suggested that this was likely due to having a similar climbing lifestyle and retained plesiomorphies, rather than a real close relationship, but suggested that it was unlikely that Oreopithecus was a member of Hominidae.

== Physical characteristics ==
Hominin timeline
← / Earlier apes; ← / Gorilla split; ← / Chimpanzee split; ← / Earliest bipedal; ← / Earliest sign of Ardipithecus; ← / Earliest sign of Australopithecus; ← / Earliest stone tools; ← / Earliest sign of Homo; ← / Dispersal beyond Africa; ← / Earliest fire / cooking; ← / Earliest rock art; ← / Earliest clothes; ← / Modern humans
(million years ago)

Oreopithecus bambolii is estimated to have weighed 30–35 kg (66–77 lb). It possessed a relatively short snout, elevated nasal bones, small and globular neurocranium, vertical orbital plane, and gracile facial bones. The shearing crests on its molars suggest a diet specializing in plant leaves. The very robust lower face, with a large attachment surface for the masseter muscle and a sagittal crest for attachment of the temporal muscle, indicates a heavy masticatory apparatus.

Its teeth were small relative to body size. The lack of a diastema (gap) between the second incisor and first premolar of the mandible indicates that Oreopithecus had canines of size comparable to the rest of its dentition. In many primates, small canines correlate with reduced inter-male competition for access to mates and less sexual dimorphism. The lower molars of O. bambolii were narrow and long, and they were larger than the upper molars.

=== Positional behavior ===
Its habitat appears to have been swampy, and not savanna or forest. The postcranial anatomy of Oreopithecus features adaptations for suspensory arborealism. Functional traits related to suspensory locomotion include its broad thorax, short trunk, high intermembral index, long and slender digits, and extensive mobility in virtually all joints. Its fingers and arms seem to show adaptations for climbing and swinging.

Its foot has been described as chimp-like, but is different from those of extant primates. The habitual line of leverage of the primate foot is parallel to the third metatarsal bone. In Oreopithecus, the lateral metatarsals are permanently abducted so that this line falls between the first and second metatarsals instead. Furthermore, the shape of the tarsus indicate loads on the foot were transmitted to the medial side of the foot instead of the lateral, like in other primates. The metatarsals are short and straight, but have a lateral orientation increase. Its foot proportions are close to the unusual proportions of Gorilla and Homo but are distinct from those found in specialized climbers. The lack of predators and the limitation of space and resources in Oreopithecus' insular environment favored a locomotor system optimized for low energy expenditure rather than speed and mobility.

Oreopithecus has been claimed to exhibit features that are adaptations to upright walking, such as the presence of a lumbar curve, in distinction to otherwise similar species known from the same period. Since the fossils have been dated to about 8 million years ago, this would represent an unusually early appearance of upright posture. However, a reevaluation of the spine from a skeleton of Oreopithecus has led to the conclusion that it lacked adaptations for habitual bipedality.

==== Semicircular canals ====
The semicircular canals of the inner ear serves as a sense organ for balance and controls the reflex for gaze stabilization. The inner ear has three canals on each side of the head, and each of the six canals encloses a membranous duct that forms an endolymph-filled circuit. Hair cells in the duct's auditory ampulla pick up endolymph disturbances caused by movement, which register as rotatory head movement. They respond to body sway of frequencies greater than 0.1 Hz and trigger the vestibulocollic (neck) reflex and vestibuloocular (eye) reflex to recover balance and gaze stability. The bony semicircular canals allow estimates of duct arc length and orientation with respect to the sagittal plane.

Across species, the semicircular canals of agile animals have larger arcs than those of slower ones. For example, the rapid leaper Tarsius bancanus has semicircular canals much bigger than the slow-climbing Nycticebus coucang. The semicircular canals of brachiating gibbons are bigger than those of arboreal and terrestrial quadrupedal great apes. As a rule of thumb, arc size of the ducts decreases with body mass and consequently slower angular head motions. Arc size increases with greater agility and thus more rapid head motions. Modern humans have bigger arcs on their anterior and posterior canals, which reflect greater angular motion along the sagittal plane. The lateral canal has a smaller arc size, corresponding to reduced head movement from side to side.

Allometric measurements on the bony labyrinth of BAC-208, a fragmentary cranium that preserves a complete, undeformed petrosal bone suggest that Oreopithecus moved with agility comparable to extant great apes. Its anterior and lateral semicircular canal sizes fall within the range for great apes. Its relatively large posterior arc implies that Oreopithecus was more proficient at stabilizing angular head motion along the sagittal plane.

=== Dexterity ===
Oreopithecus had hominin-like hand proportions that allowed a firm, pad-to-pad precision grip. Features present in the hands of neither non-human-extant nor fossil apes include hand length, relative thumb length, a deep and large insertion for the flexor pollicis longus, and the shape of the carpometacarpal joint between the metacarpal bone of the index finger and the capitate bone. At the base of the second metacarpal bone, the facet for the capitate is oriented transversally, as in hominins. The capitate, on the other hand, lacks the waisting associated with apes and climbing, and still present in Australopithecus. Oreopithecus share the specialised orientation at the carpometacarpal joint with A. afarenis and the marked groove for the flexor pollicis longus with A. africanus. It is thus likely that the hand morphology of Oreopithecus is derived for apes and convergent for early hominins.

=== Palaeoecology ===
The long and narrow mandibular molars of O. bambolii, combined with the greater size of the mandibular molars relative to the maxillary molars, has been interpreted as an adaptation to a folivorous diet.

== See also ==
- List of fossil sites
- List of human evolution fossils (with images)
