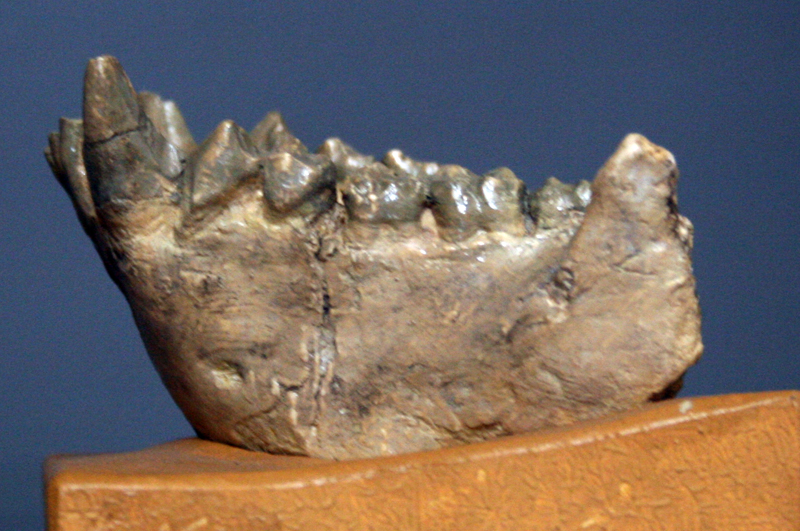
- Cast of the type specimen of Dryopithecus, MNHNP AC 36, from Saint-Gaudens, France (11.5 Mya old)

Scientific classification
- Kingdom: Animalia
- Phylum: Chordata
- Class: Mammalia
- Order: Primates
- Superfamily: Hominoidea
- Family: Hominidae
- Subfamily: Homininae
- Tribe: †Dryopithecini; Gregory & Hellman, 1939

Genera
- Anoiapithecus; Danuvius; Dryopithecus; Hispanopithecus; Pierolapithecus; Rudapithecus; (but see text)

= Dryopithecini =

Dryopithecini Temporal range: Miocene 14–7 Ma

Extinct tribe of apes

Dryopithecini is an extinct tribe of Eurasian and African great apes that are believed to be close to the ancestry of gorillas, chimpanzees and humans. They are a mid-late Miocene group as far as is known, diversifying rapidly one or two million years before to the Tortonian, and flourishing throughout that age, but probably originating in the early Serravallian already, with the oldest fossils sometimes assigned to this lineage almost 15 million years old. They were mid- to large-sized primates, weighing as much as a gibbon or large chimpanzee (20-45 kg), and perhaps more.

The relationships and extent of this group are not thoroughly understood, and at least in its widest circumscription, it is probably not monophyletic. As a tribe of the Homininae, it is assumed to be embedded within the African great apes. Authors who consider them to be basal to these, and no closer to modern humans than Asian great apes, treat them as distinct subfamily Dryopithecinae instead. Either way, members of this group are called dryopithecines or dryopithecins in English.

== Evolution and ecology ==
Their origins are in Africa, but they expanded across Europa (via Asia Minor) where they adapted to local habitats and radiated into a wide variety of chimpanzee-, gorilla-, and even gibbon-like forms. They somewhat marginalized the previously dominant Pliopithecoidea – an advanced lineage of originally African monkeys that became widespread in Eurasia some 15 million years ago –, but the Crouzeliinae pliopithecoid Anapithecus coexisted with the dryopithecine Rudapithecus in today's North Hungarian Mountains, and Pliobates may represent the farthest expansion of crouzeliines, all the way into the range of the ecologically similar dryopithecine Pierolapithecus in the Iberian Penedès region.

After thriving for 5 million years, Europe's first great apes quite abruptly became entirely extinct at the start of the Messinian. The causes of this are not well understood yet. Most likely, the demise of the dryopithecines is to be seen within a larger-scale geological changes and consequent faunal turnovers which are also reflected in the Messinian salinity crisis and the radiation of Hominini in Africa, which roughly another 5 million years later expanded into Europe again with our genus Homo.

== Taxonomy ==
Division into subtribes is tentative; within each division, taxa are sorted from oldest to youngest.

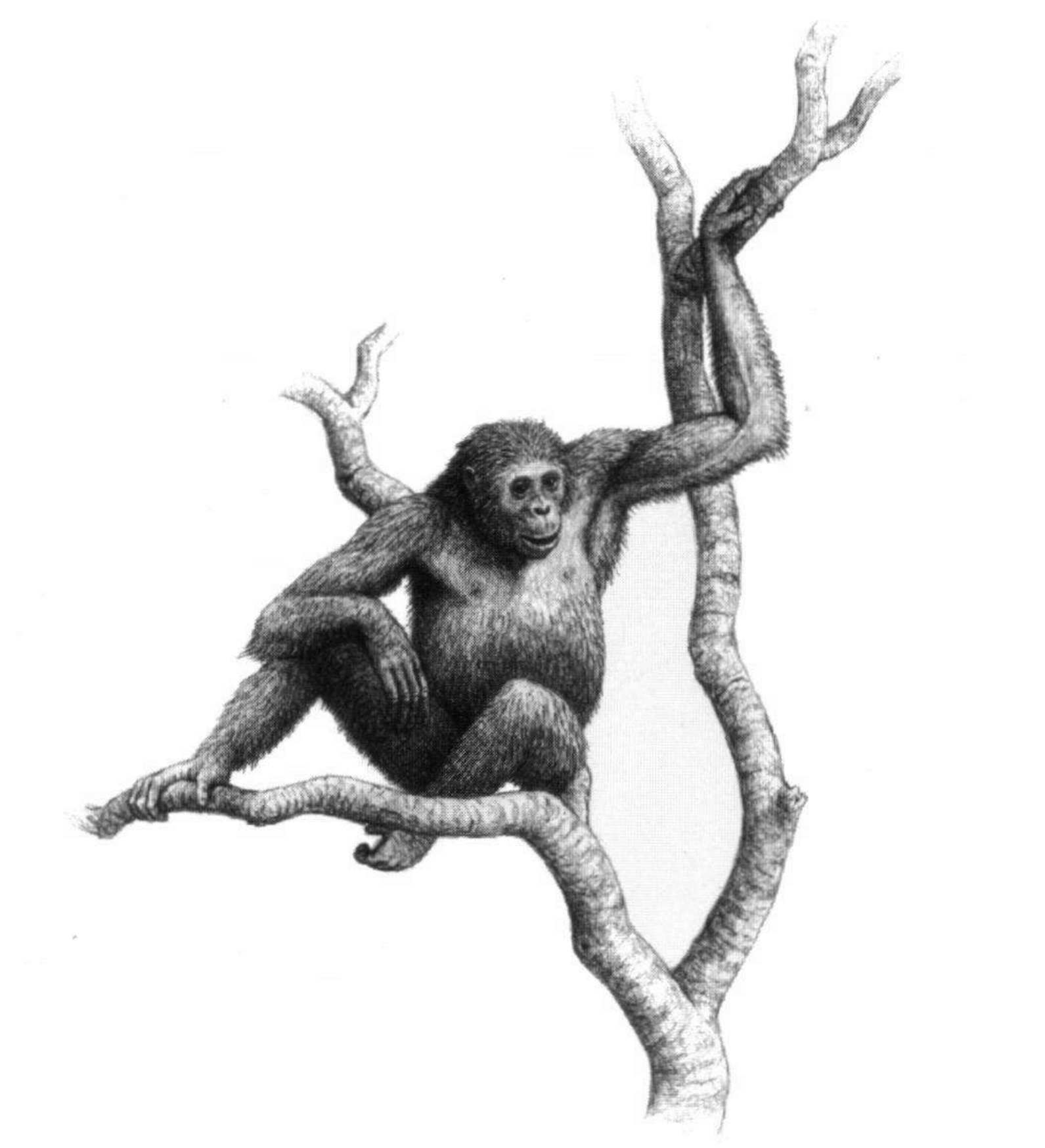
Reconstruction of Hispanopithecus laietanus, one of the smaller predominantly tree-dwelling dryopithecines

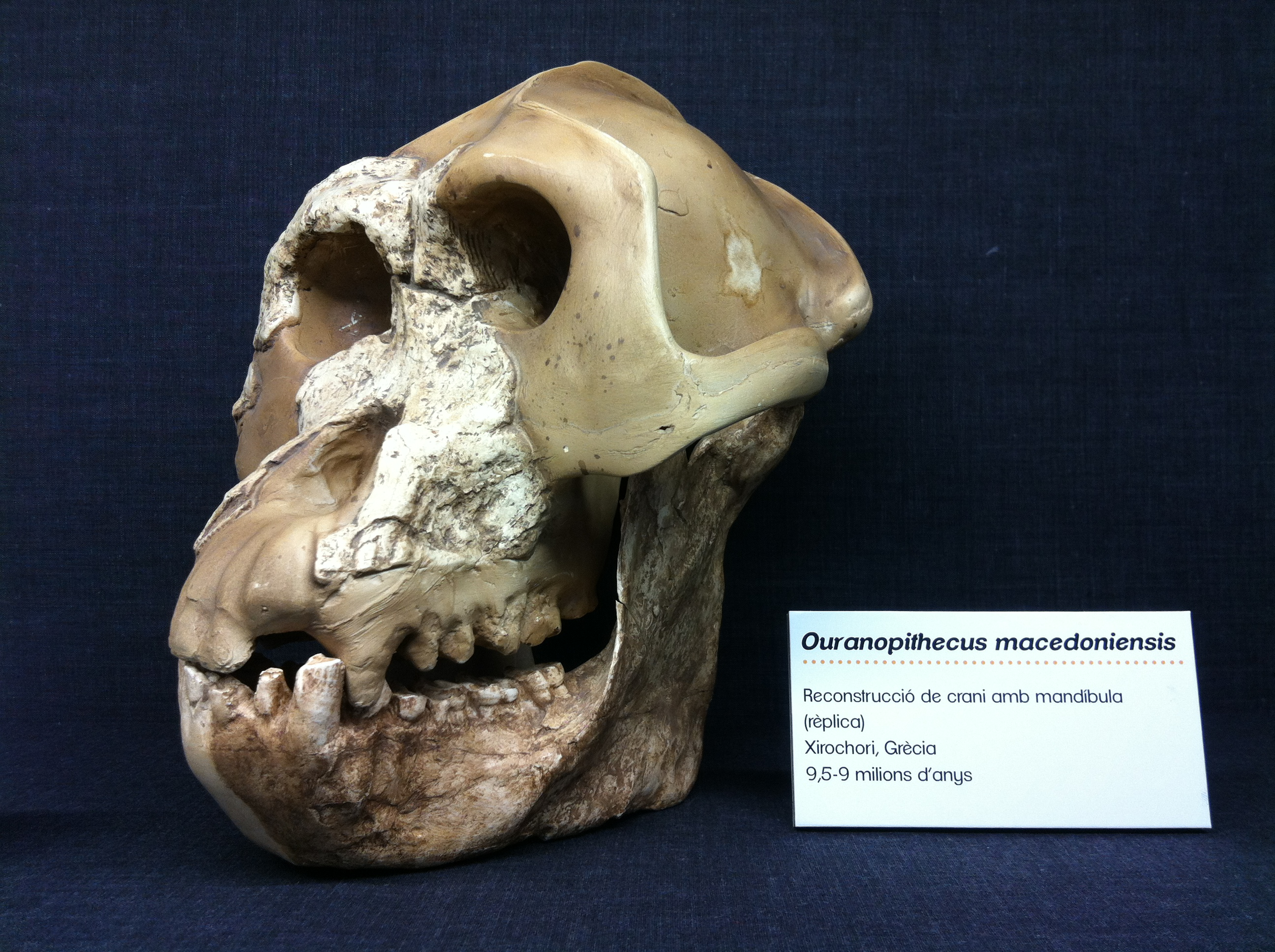
Reconstructed skull of Ouranopithecus macedoniensis, a much more robust species than H.laietanus and probably not closely related

Incertae sedis:

- Danuvius guggenmosi – Dryopithecina or Ouranopithecina
  - Buronius manfredschmidi – tentatively placed here; possibly synonymous

Subtribe Dryopithecina Gregory & Hellman, 1939

- Pierolapithecus catalaunicus
- Dryopithecus
  - Dryopithecus carinthiacus – tentatively placed here
  - Dryopithecus fontani
- Anoiapithecus brevirostris
- Hispanopithecus – tentatively placed here
  - Hispanopithecus crusafonti
  - Hispanopithecus laietanus
- Rudapithecus hungaricus – tentatively placed here
- Udabnopithecus garedziensis – also included in Dryopithecus

Subtribe Ouranopithecina Begun, 2009 – tentatively placed here

- Ouranopithecus
  - Ouranopithecus macedoniensis
  - Ouranopithecus turkae – also separated in Anadoluvius
- Graecopithecus freybergi
- Nakalipithecus nakayami?

Occasionally, Limnopithecus and even the entire Gigantopithecus clade (Sivapithecini AKA "Gigantopithecina") were included in the dryopthecines; more recent authors generally consider them dendropithecids (ancient apes) and pongines (Asian great apes), respectively. Subsequent cladistic analyses found the presumed Dryopithecina not particularly close to African great apes, and tentatively suggested a closer relationship to the Lufengpithecini (which are usually considered Asian great apes). Some of the other supposed dryopithecines might be basal members of the African great apes, and yet again others might belong to some unrelated group of apes; overall, the monophyly of the more comprehensive circumscriptions of the dryopithecines is highly suspect. However, it must be noted that these analyses focused on the early evolution of apes, and used only a few species of purported dryopithecines within a comprehensive great-ape framework supported by molecular data (which is unavailable for the dryopithecines); these results are therefore unreliable on their own. Thus, these ancient great apes still eluded a robust classification as of the early 2020s.

In 2022, the first modern analysis of dryopithecine relationships found the core group ("subtribe Dryopithecina" above) to most likely represent an independent Afroeuropean lineage of great apes, best classified as a subfamily. This group unites smaller species, which primarily ate softer food, and perhaps had some adaptations for bipedal walking on tree branches. The "Ouranopithecina" (possibly including Nakalipithecus), however, seem to be much closer to African great apes, and could be considered as a tribe Ouranopithecini of Homininae; they were chimpanzee-sized or larger, but with a more stocky, gorilla-like build and probably eating mainly hard nuts and/or tubers. "Kenyapithecina" could represent the last remnants of the original great apes of almost 20 million years ago, before they diverged into their main African and Asian (and possibly Afroeuropean) lineages, or ancestral dryopithecines; they were apparently inhabitants of open habitats, well-adapted to knuckle-walking on the ground, and could handle a varied diet. Oreopithecus and Samburupithecus are apes of unclear affiliation, perhaps even less close to Dryopithecus than gibbons. And while Lufengpithecus lufengensis is resolved as an Asian great ape (as is Gigantopithecus), its supposed congener "L." hudienensis (known only from facial bones) remained unplaceable, possibly confounding the analysis right where it most affected the placement of the early European great apes. Therefore, while a core dryopithecine clade may well be real, the group in its wide circumscriptions seems to encompass at least two, if not three, independent out-of-Africa expansions of Hominidae into Europe.
