= Human dispersals in Europe =

Colonisation of the European continent

Human dispersals in Europe refers to the colonisation of the European continent by various species in the genus Homo (the taxonomic group equivalent to humans), beginning with Homo erectus. The genus Homo originated in Africa, possibly either deriving in situ from an australopith ancestor or as a result of admixture between contemporary australopithecine populations. Around 1.9–2 million years ago, Homo erectus populations expanded into Europe, where fossil evidence is attributed to it and closely related subgroups such as the Dmanisi hominins in Georgia, H. e. tautavelensis at Caune de l’Arago near the southern border of France, H. heidelbergensis, an immediate descendant of H. erectus and the likely ancestor of anatomically modern humans and the archaic sister species Neanderthals and Denisovans, has been described at Petralona Cave in Greece, Sima de los Huesos in Spain, and the type specimen in Mauer, near the German city of Heidelberg for which the species was named. Evidence of Neanderthals is extremely widespread in Europe, notably Vindija cave in Croatia from which the draft Neanderthal genome was sequenced in 2010.

The expansion of humans into Europe was accompanied by migrations into Asia, where fossil remains have been attributed to Homo erectus and various subspecies such as H. e. pekinensis, and more derived groups such as H. floresiensis and H. luzonensis. Neanderthals and Denisovan remains have also been recovered from multiple sites in the Altai mountains in Siberia (Chagyrskaya, Okladnikov, and Denisova caves) some of which has produced additional Neanderthal and Denisovan genome sequences which revealed evidence of ancient admixture with modern humans.

== Miocene and pre-European hominids ==
Fossil evidence of several species pre-dating the genus Homo (i.e., "humans") as well as its enclosing group Hominina (australopithecines) but generally agreed to be part of the family Hominidae (hominids, the great apes) have been recovered in what is today the European continent. Importantly however, neither the permanent geographic separation between North Africa and Western Europe nor the connection between Africa and Eurasia existed prior to the Miocene epoch, when the Eurasian, Arabian, and African continental plates collided and resulted in a sporadically continuous landmass, prolonged biotic exchange, and the end of the last remnants of the Tethys Ocean. Thus it is considered anachronistic to refer to distinct European and African bioregions prior to and during this process, including the expansion of Miocene taxa into "Europe" per se. More properly, these taxa are referred to as having existed in various Miocene paleoregions such as the Western and Central Paratethys, the Carpathian origeny, the Aegean and Pannonian Basin palaeolands, etc.

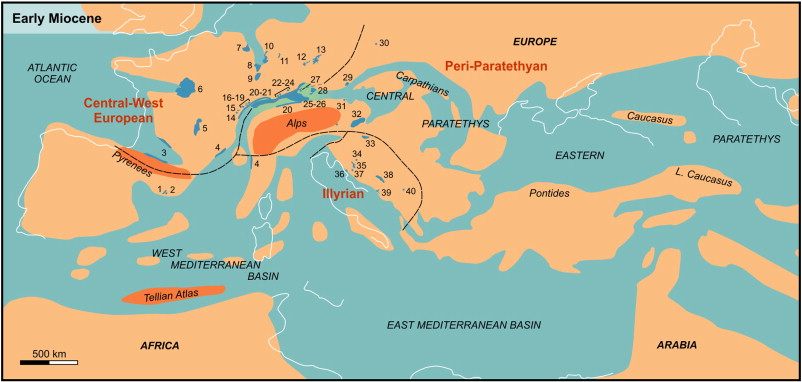
An overview of Miocene bioregions in the Eurasian, African, and Arabian tectonic plates.

Hominin timeline
← / Earlier apes; ← / Gorilla split; ← / Chimpanzee split; ← / Earliest bipedal; ← / Earliest sign of Ardipithecus; ← / Earliest sign of Australopithecus; ← / Earliest stone tools; ← / Earliest sign of Homo; ← / Dispersal beyond Africa; ← / Earliest fire / cooking; ← / Earliest rock art; ← / Earliest clothes; ← / Modern humans
(million years ago)

In the Early Miocene, Europe had a subtropical climate and was intermittently connected to Africa by land bridges such as the Gomphoterian bridge. At the same time, Africa was becoming more arid, prompting the dispersal of its tropical fauna—including primates—north into the proto-European continent. Apes first appear in the European fossil record 17 million years ago with Griphopithecus. The closely related Kenyapithecus is also known from fossils in Germany, Slovakia and Turkey. Both Griphopithecus and Kenyapithecus are considered likely to be ancestral to the great apes. From 13 million to 9 million years ago, hominids flourished in Europe and underwent an adaptive radiation as they diversified in response to a gradually cooling climate. Middle Miocene European hominids include Pierolapithecus, Anoiapithecus, Dryopithecus, Hispanopithecus, and Rudapithecus. The diversity and early appearance of great apes in Europe has led some scientists to theorise that hominids in fact evolved there, before dispersing "back to Africa" in the Middle Miocene.

Around 9 million years ago most of Europe's hominid species fell victim to the Vallesian crisis, an extinction event caused by the disappearance of the continent's forests. Some hominid species survived the event: Oreopithecus, which became isolated in forest refugia; and Ouranopithecus, which adapted to the open environments of the late Miocene. However, both were extinct by 7 million years ago.

In 2017, a reanalysis of Graecopithecus fossils from Greece and Bulgaria, previously associated with Ouranopithecus, concluded that the species was in fact a hominin dating to just after the last common ancestor of humans and chimpanzees (about 7.2 million years ago). The authors suggested that the origins of the human lineage were therefore in the Mediterranean, not Africa. Others are skeptical of their claims.

Although subtropical conditions returned to Europe in the Pliocene (5.33–2.58 million years ago), there are no known fossil hominids from this period.

== Origin of humans in Europe ==
Homo erectus populations lived in southeastern Europe by 1.8 million years ago. Colonisation of Europe in prehistory was not achieved in one immigrating wave, but instead through multiple dispersal events. Most of these instances in Eurasia were limited to 40th parallel north. Besides the findings from East Anglia, the first constant presence of archaic humans in Europe begins 500,000–600,000 years ago. However, this presence was limited to western Europe, not reaching places like the Russian plains, until 200,000–300,000 years ago. The exception to this was discovered in East Anglia, where archaic humans briefly inhabited 700,000 years ago.

The most archaic human fossils from the Middle Pleistocene (780,000–125,000 years ago) have been found in Europe. Remains of Homo heidelbergensis have been found as far north as the Atapuerca Mountains in Gran Dolina, Spain, and the oldest specimens can be dated from 850,000 to 200,000 years ago.

Neanderthals evolved from a branch of Homo heidelbergensis that migrated to Europe during the Middle Pleistocene. Neanderthal populations date back at least as far as 400,000 years ago in the Atapuerca Mountains, Spain. While lacking the robustness attributed to west European Neanderthal morphology, other populations did inhabit parts of eastern Europe and western Asia. Between 45,000–35,000 years ago, modern humans (Homo sapiens) replaced all Neanderthal populations in Europe anatomically and genetically. This is evident in the transfer and combination of technology and culture.

== Anatomically modern humans ==
The recent expansion of anatomically modern humans reached Europe around 40,000 years ago, from Central Asia and the Middle East, as a result of cultural adaption to big game hunting of sub-glacial steppe fauna. Neanderthals were present both in the Middle East and in Europe, and the arriving populations of anatomically modern humans (also known as "Cro-Magnon" or European early modern humans) have interbred with Neanderthal populations to a limited degree.

Modern human remains dating to 43,000–45,000 years ago have been discovered in Italy and Britain, with the remains found of those that reached the European Russian Arctic 40,000 years ago. The composition of European populations was later altered by further migrations, notably the Neolithic expansion from the Middle East, and still later the Chalcolithic population movements associated with Indo-European expansion.

The dominant population of Europe is composed of three major foundational populations, dubbed "Western Hunter-Gatherers" (WHG), "Early European Farmers" (EEF) and "Ancient North Eurasian" (ANE). WHG represents the remnant of the original Cro-Magnon population after they re-peopled Europe after the Last Glacial Maximum. EEF represents the introgression of Near Eastern populations during the Neolithic Revolution, and ANE is associated both with the Mesolithic Uralic expansion to Northern Europe and the Indo-European expansion to Europe in the Chalcolithic.

== Pressures favoring migration ==
Homo ergaster specimens indicate a change toward a diet more reliant on animal products, evident by greater encephalization with higher energy requirements. This transition to becoming more carnivorous affected the way of life unlike primates before. Archaeological evidence of cut bones from large mammals and broken stone tools increasing in frequency support this increasing trend. To meet increasing demand of calories, the range of humans would have expanded, making the necessary hunting versus prior scavenging possible. It is believed that the adjustments required to meet these new demands would expand the home range size eight to ten times. Range could also increase or decrease in size due to environmental changes. A more recent example is absence of humans in Britain during the last glacial maximum which ended in the Late Pleistocene, 10,000 years ago. At this time, Russia had an influx of people following the major prey species shifting to this region. It has been argued that Neanderthals', and previous humans', expansion northward were limited by lacking proper thermoregulation. Behavioural adaptations such as clothes-making to overcome the cold is evident in archaeological finds. The potential to expand also grew with the Neanderthal reaching the status of top carnivores. These humans could fear less during expansion, without the worry of other predators. The desire to push into these northern areas was influenced by this requirement to eat a lot of meat to satisfy the human brain which uses 20% of the body's energy. Larger game for hunting is available the closer you are to the poles.

== See also ==
- Early human migrations
- Historical migration
- History of Europe
- Human migration
