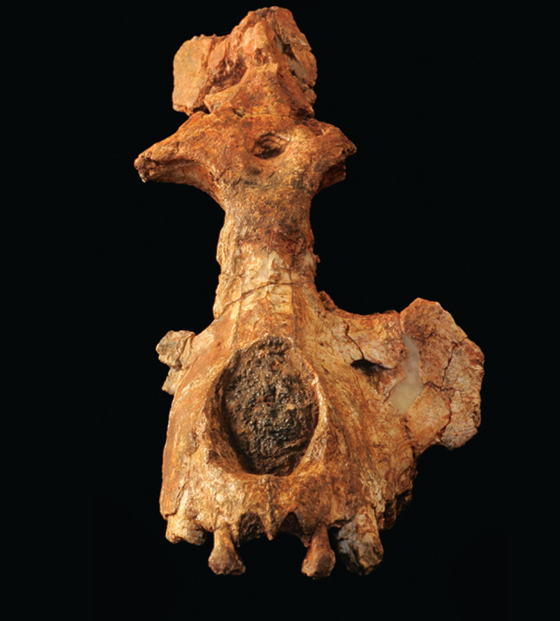
- Saadanius hijazensis

Scientific classification
- Kingdom: Animalia
- Phylum: Chordata
- Class: Mammalia
- Order: Primates
- Suborder: Haplorhini
- Infraorder: Simiiformes
- Parvorder: Catarrhini
- Superfamily: †Saadanioidea; Zalmout et al., 2010
- Family: †Saadaniidae; Zalmout et al., 2010
- Genus: †Saadanius; Zalmout et al., 2010
- Species: †S. hijazensis

Binomial name
- †Saadanius hijazensis Zalmout et al., 2010

= Saadanius =

Saadanius Temporal range: 29–28 Ma

Extinct genus of primates

Saadanius is a genus of fossil primates dating to the Oligocene that is closely related to the common ancestor of the Old World monkeys and apes, collectively known as catarrhines. It is represented by a single species, Saadanius hijazensis, which is known only from a single partial skull tentatively dated between 29 and 28 million years ago. It was discovered in 2009 in western Saudi Arabia near Mecca and was first described in 2010 after comparison with both living and fossil catarrhines.

Saadanius had a longer face than living catarrhines and lacked the advanced frontal sinus found in living catarrhines. However, it had a bony ectotympanic and teeth comparable to those of living catarrhines. Its discovery provided new information about the early evolution of catarrhines.

== Taxonomy ==
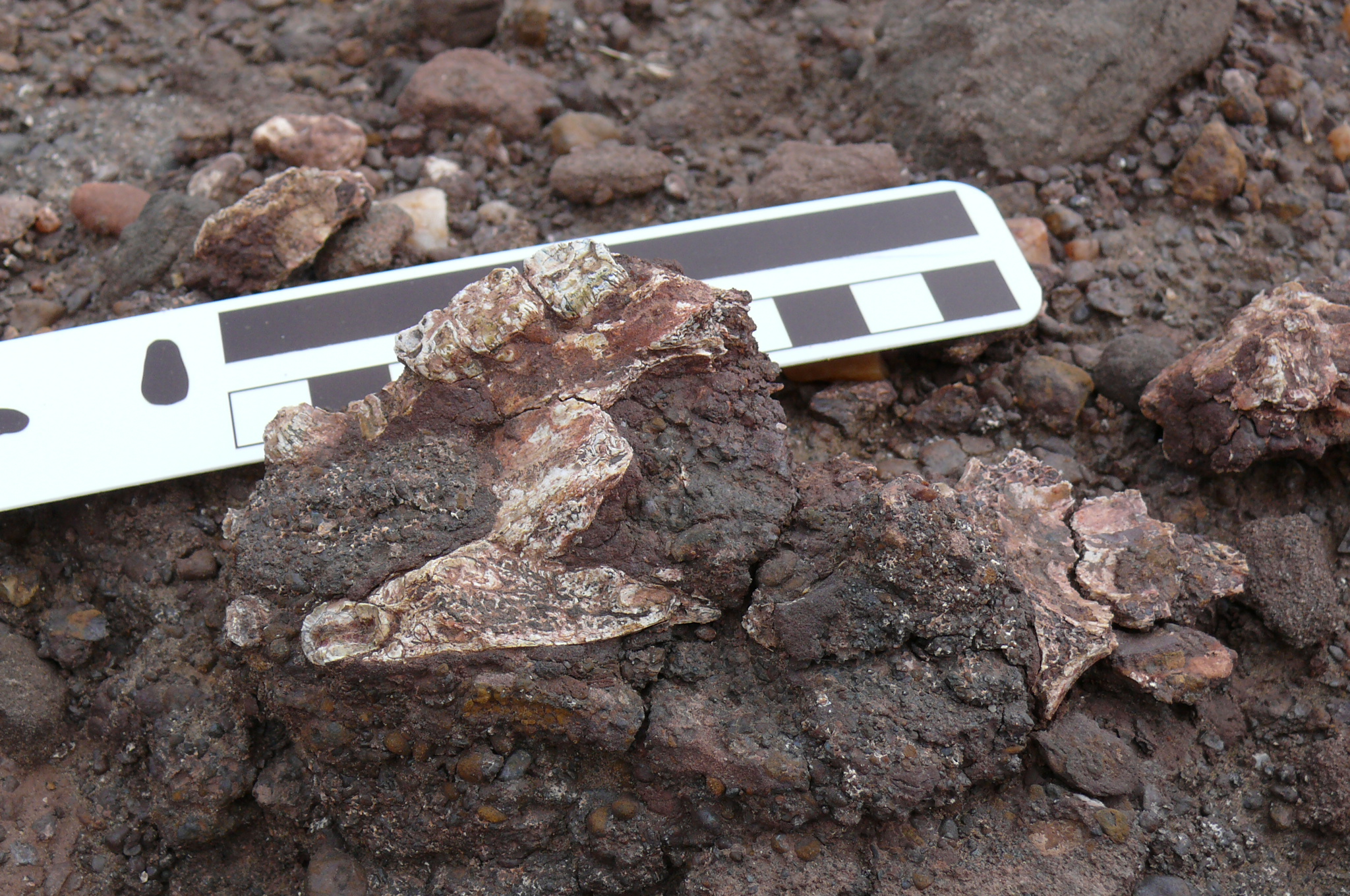
The specimen was found with the palate and teeth facing upward.

Saadanius is known from a single specimen, the holotype, named "SGS-UM 2009-002", stored in Jeddah, Saudi Arabia, at the Paleontology Unit of the Saudi Geological Survey (SGS). The specimen was discovered in southwestern Saudi Arabia in February 2009 by paleontologist Iyad Zalmout, who had traveled to the region to search for ancient whale and dinosaur fossils. While looking for dinosaur fossils in an area that, according to the maps he was working from, contained rock layers that dated to the Cretaceous, Zalmout found the jawbone of an anthracotheriid, which dated to the Eocene or Oligocene. This indicated that the rock layers were much younger than what was dated on the maps. The following day, he noticed fossil teeth, which he immediately recognized as those of a primate. Zalmout emailed a photo of the teeth to paleontologist Philip D. Gingerich, with whom he was working as a postdoctoral fellow. Gingerich, an expert on ancient primates and whales, confirmed that it was indeed a primate. Due to a tight schedule, Zalmout had to leave the exposed fossil embedded in the rock for the next few days because collecting it would require days of work. The fossil was soon recovered by a joint expedition involving the SGS and the University of Michigan.

The fossil was formally described in 2010 when its discovery was announced in the journal Nature. The genus name, Saadanius, comes from the Arabic word, saadan (Arabic: سَعدان), which is the collective term for apes and monkeys. The species name, hijazensis, is a reference to the al Hijaz region, in which it was discovered.

== Description ==
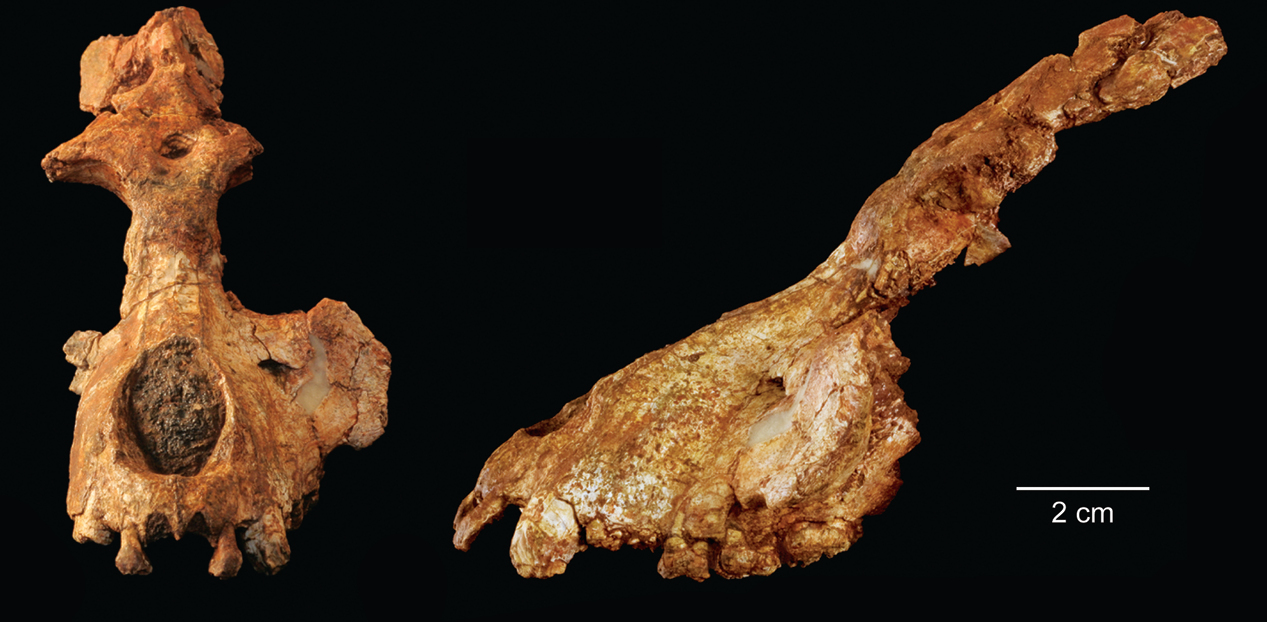
Front and side view of Saadanius hijazensis.

The only known fossil of Saadanius is a partial skull, preserving much of the face and palate and many of the teeth. Two bite marks, one of which may have been fatal, are visible on the skull. Its enlarged, deep-rooted canine teeth, the diastema between its canine teeth and second incisors, and its sagittal crest suggest that the specimen was a male. These features are shared among male Old World monkeys.

Saadanius had a longer face than living catarrhines, more closely resembling New World monkeys in appearance, although it was larger, similar in size to the siamang. It most closely resembles the older fossil Aegyptopithecus, but it also shares some similarities with later catarrhines. For example, it lacks the advanced frontal sinus found in living hominoids, but it does possess a tube-shaped ectotympanic, found in living catarrhines. Propliopithecoids, the oldest stem group of catarrhines, which date back 35 to 30 mya, lacked a fully developed ectotympanic.

The upper molars were relatively wide, with prominent well-separated cusps. The third upper molar (M^{3}) was larger than the second (M^{2}). The canines were relatively smaller than in some later taxa like Proconsul, with an approximately oval cross-section. The nasal aperture is relatively large, though unlike in Dendropithecus it does not extend between the roots of the first incisors. The nasals are long and narrow and do not touch the premaxillae.

== Phylogeny ==
Saadanius placement within the catarrhine clade

- Catarrhini
  - Propliopithecoidea (Aegyptopithecus)
  - - Pliopithecoidea (Pliopithecus)
    - - Saadanius
      - - crown catarrhines
          (living and fossil)

Comparative anatomy and cladistic analysis performed when the fossil was discovered indicate that Saadanius is more closely related to the last common ancestor of crown catarrhines than any other known fossil catarrhines, placing the common ancestry of Catarrhini in Arabia and Africa. Other stem catarrhines include propliopithecoids, such as Aegyptopithecus, and pliopithecoids, such as Pliopithecus. The closer similarities between Saadanius and crown catarrhines, particularly its ectotympanic, suggest Saadanius of all known fossil primates most closely resembled the last common ancestor of living catarrhines. Some later studies instead found Saadanius to be more closely related to Old World monkeys than to hominoids, placing it among crown catarrhines.

Animated 3D view of the skull

The discovery of Saadanius provides new evidence for competing hypotheses about the facial appearance of the ancestral crown catarrhines, or common ancestor. One reconstruction is based on living catarrhine traits and predicts a short face and a rounded braincase, similar to that of a gibbon. Another reconstruction, based on the morphology of early Miocene apes and the basal cercopithecoid Victoriapithecus, predicts that the last common ancestor had a projecting snout and tall face, like that of living baboons and the oldest fossil apes and Old World monkeys. The conservative features of Saadanius, similar to those of the older stem catarrhines, support the latter hypothesis, according to Zalmout et al. However, one palaeontologist, Eric Delson, has cautioned that geological pressure may have distorted the shape of the skull.

According to Zalmout et al., Saadanius may also help resolve the age of the hominoid–cercopithecoid split. Paleoanthropological work has typically placed the divergence between 25 and 23 mya, but genetic-based estimates have placed it in the early Oligocene, approximately 33 mya. Despite the predictions from the genetic tests, little fossil evidence has been found for a last common ancestor between 30 and 23 mya, favoring a later split. Only isolated teeth of Kamoyapithecus hinted at the existence of potential basal hominoids in the late Oligocene (between 24 and 27.5 mya), while the oldest fossil Old World monkey, Victoriapithecus macinnesi, dates to 19 mya. With the discovery of Saadanius, Zalmout et al. suggested a later split than the genetic data, dating between 29–28 and 24 mya. However, Pozzi et al. later argued that although Saadanius is a significant discovery, because it is a stem catarrhine, it could not be used to date the divergence of the crown group. The presence of stem taxa in the fossil record does not indicate that crown groups have evolved, and stem taxa may survive for millions of years after the crown taxa appear. For this reason, the fossil record can only suggest a hard minimum boundary for divergence dates, which corresponds to the first appearance of a crown taxon. Furthermore, Pozzi et al. pointed out that the supplementary material published by Zalmout et al. demonstrated that Pliopithecoidea were more closely related to living catarrhines than Saadanius. In 2013, two other Oligocene catarrhines were announced, the proposed Old World monkey Nsungwepithecus and the hominoid Rukwapithecus.

The fossil find has also been seen by the SGS as an important find for Saudi Arabia, because it enriches the fossil record for the region. As a result of the find, both the SGS and the University of Michigan are considering more collaborative field explorations in the country.

== Paleoecology ==
Saadanius was found on top of an oolitic ironstone fossil bed of the middle Shumaysi Formation located in the southwest corner of Harrat Al Ujayfa, in western Saudi Arabia, close to Mecca. Other fossils recovered from the same horizon include a few teeth and jaws of the following mammals:

- Bothriogenys fraasi, an anthracotheriid
- Palaeomastodon sp., an early proboscidean
- A mammutid mastodon
- Gomphotherium, another proboscidean
- Megalohyrax eocaenus, a hyrax
- Geniohyus or Bunohyrax, another hyrax
- Arsinoitherium, an embrithopod

The presence of a gomphothere and mammutid suggests that the deposits are younger than the Jebel Qatrani Formation at Fayum in Egypt, while the other taxa indicate an older age than the Chilga Formation of Ethiopia. This led Zalmout's team to assign an age of 28 or 29 million years to the Shumaysi Formation fauna. However, the date has yet to be confirmed by other dating techniques. A 2020 review assigned the Harrat Al Ujayfa locality to the Turkwelian African land mammal age, which started 28.2 million years ago.

Like other catarrhine primates, Saadanius was probably a tree-dweller. During the time it would have lived, the Red Sea had not yet formed, and new plant and animal species would have been arriving from nearby Eurasia as it converged with the Afro-Arabian landmass.

The specimen had serious puncture wounds on the front of the skull, indicating that it had been preyed upon by a large carnivore. One puncture wound was on the right side of the braincase and may have been the fatal blow. There was also a bite mark on the frontal trigone.
