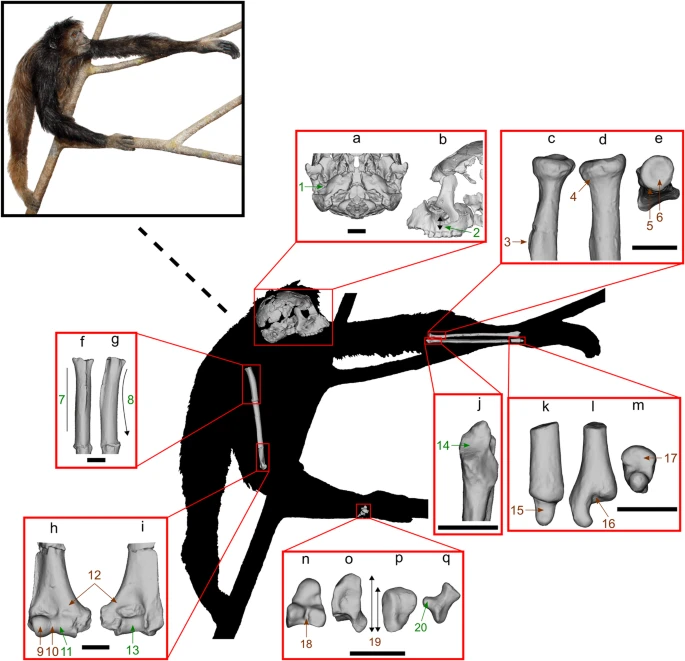
- Pliobates fossils and reconstruction

Scientific classification
- Kingdom: Animalia
- Phylum: Chordata
- Class: Mammalia
- Order: Primates
- Suborder: Haplorhini
- Infraorder: Simiiformes
- Family: †Pliopithecidae
- Subfamily: †Crouzeliinae
- Genus: †Pliobates; Alba et al. 2015
- Species: †P. cataloniae

Binomial name
- †Pliobates cataloniae Alba et al. 2015

= Pliobates =

Pliobates Temporal range: 11.6 Ma

Extinct genus of primates

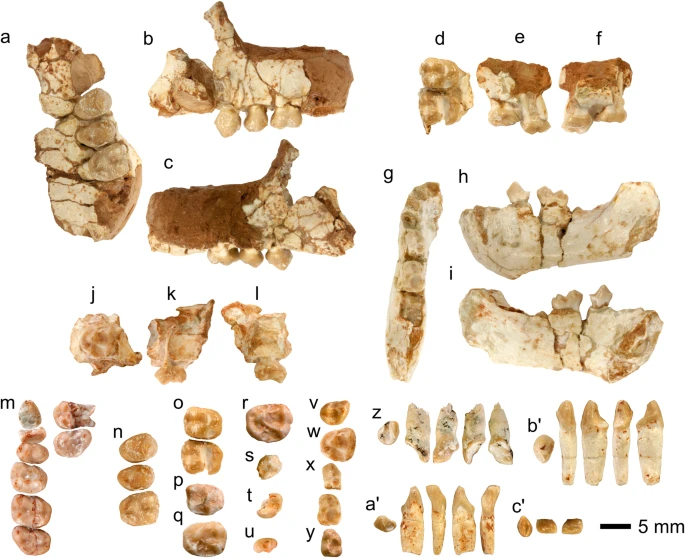
Pliobates mouthparts and teeth.

Pliobates cataloniae is a primate from 11.6 million years ago, during the Iberian Miocene. Originally described as a species of stem-ape that was found to be the sister taxon to gibbons and great apes like humans, it was subsequently reinterpreted as a non-ape catarrhine belonging to the group Crouzeliidae within the superfamily Pliopithecoidea on the basis of discovery of new dental remains with crouzeliid synapomorphies.

== Mosaic characteristics ==
Its anatomy is gibbon-like; prior to this discovery, it was assumed that the ancestral ape bauplan was robust like Proconsul. This species has mosaic characteristics of primitive, monkey-like features and the more derived ape characteristics; however, even when originally described it wasn't interpreted as a direct ancestor of modern apes but rather a side-branch that retained the ancestral morphotype and was thus placed in its own family Pliobatidae. Its subsequent placement within Pliopithecoidea indicates that it was convergent with apes in elbow and wrist morphology.

== Palaeobiology ==
Based on the morphology of its ulna, the methods of locomotion of Pliobates consisted of above-branch quadrupedalism and eclectic climbing, along with suspensory behaviours resembling those of modern spider monkeys.
