= Kapi (mammal) =

Kapi Temporal range: Miocene, 13.8–12.5 Ma

Scientific classification
- Kingdom: Animalia
- Phylum: Chordata
- Class: Mammalia
- Infraclass: Placentalia
- Order: Primates
- Superfamily: †Pliopithecoidea
- Genus: †Kapi; Gilbert et al., 2020
- Species: †K. ramnagarensis

Binomial name
- †Kapi ramnagarensis Gilbert et al., 2020

Extinct genus of primate

Kapi is an extinct primate genus that lived in northern India about 13.8 to 12.5 million years ago during the Miocene. The only species, K. ramnagarensis, was described in 2020 and is known from a complete lower molar. The fossil was discovered in 2015 from Ramnagar, a town in Jammu and Kashmir, for which the species name was created. Though originally identified as member of the gibbons and popularised in the news as the oldest gibbon, it was later reassessed as a pliopithecoid, a group of extinct Old World monkeys.

== Discovery ==
American palaeontologists led by Christopher Gilbert, from the Hunter College of the City University of New York and the American Museum of Natural History, and Indian scientists, Ningthoujam Premjit Singh and Rajeev Patnaik, both from Panjab University, explored the Lower Siwaliks of Ramnagar in Jammu and Kashmir since 2010. A number of animal fossils were collected but the most important was a lower jaw bone (mandible) with three molar teeth attached to it which was found in 2014. The fossil was identified as that of a hitherto primate and was named in 2017 as Ramadapis sahnii.

The team took further exploration of the same area in 2015. One day, as the team took rest, Gilbert noticed a shiny object among a pile of dirt on the ground. As he dug up, the object was a molar tooth, as he reported, "We knew immediately it was a primate tooth, but it did not look like the tooth of any of the primates previously found in the area." However, the identification was difficult and only after five years, they were able to identify it as belonging to extinct gibbons. They reported the discovery in the Proceedings of the Royal Society B on 8 September 2020.

=== Etymology ===
The generic name Kapi is from the Hindi term for a monkey or ape. The specific name is after Ramnagar, where the type specimen was found.

== Features ==
Kapi is known only from a single tooth. The specimen is a right lower third molar. It shows low crown and generally smaller and narrower than those of other gibbons. The tooth structure indicates that it was a fruit-eating primate.

== Reassessment ==
The original report concluded that "if one considersYuanmoupithecus a stem hylobatid, Kapi is equally if not more likely to be one as well, making it the earliest known hylobatid in the fossil record." Yuanmoupithecus is a gibbon fossil discovered from China in 2006, dated to 6 to 8 million years old. Better fossils were later discovered and reanalysed in 2022 which supported reclassification of Kapi as a pliopithecoid.
