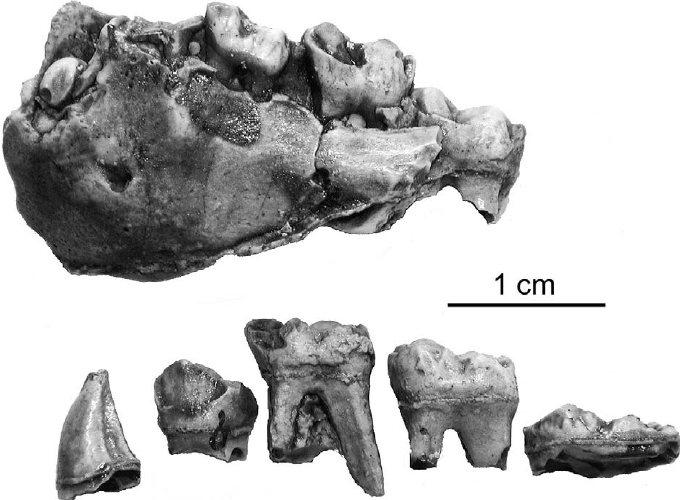

Scientific classification
- Kingdom: Animalia
- Phylum: Chordata
- Class: Mammalia
- Order: Primates
- Family: †Pliopithecidae
- Subfamily: †Crouzeliinae
- Genus: †Anapithecus; Kretzoi, 1975

Species
- †Anapithecus hernyaki

= Anapithecus =

Anapithecus Temporal range: Late Miocene Miocene

Extinct genus of primates

Anapithecus (pronounced Ana-PITH-i-kuhs; from Greek πίθηκος pithekos "ape") is a late Miocene primate (10 million years old) known from fossil locations in Hungary and Austria. Many Anapithecus fossils come from the site of Rudabánya, in northern Hungary, where Anapithecus lived alongside the ape Rudapithecus. The only species in the genus, Anapithecus hernyaki, is named after Gabor Hernyák, chief geologist of the Iron Ore Works of Rudabánya.

== Classification and phylogeny ==
Anapithecus belongs to the clade Pliopithecoidea, an extinct group of primates that inhabited Eurasia during the Miocene epoch (17-7 million years ago). Pliopithecoids are catarrhine primates, sharing a common ancestor, and many physical characteristics, with both apes and Old World monkeys. Evolutionarily speaking pliopithecoids are considered to be a primitive side-branch of the catarrhine family tree, which diverged over 20 million years ago, prior to the split between apes and Old World monkeys. Among the pliopithecoids, Anapithecus is classified as a crouzeliine. The crouzeliines are characterized by having molars with high, sharp crests and deep occlusal basins. These crests have been suggested to be indicative of folivory.

== Physical characteristics ==
Anapithecus weighed approximately 15 kg, making it the heaviest known pliopithecoid, about the same size as large adult gibbon. Similar to other pliopithecoids Anapithecus had a relatively short face, broad orbits with projecting rims, low cheekbones, and a globular skull. Although similar in size to a gibbon, the jaw bone of Anapithecus is much deeper and more robust. Anapithecus is defined by a series of unique dental characteristics. Most notable among these is the distinctive system of crests found on the first lower molar. The crests form a Y shape between the cusps of the teeth (although this is not to be confused with Y-5 pattern found on the lower molars of apes). Less is known about postcranial morphology of Anapithecus, as the majority of fossils consist of teeth. Still, analyses have determined that Anapithecus was most likely a suspensory arboreal primate, which swung below from tree branch to tree branch, akin to an ape. This stands in contrast to the smaller pliopithecoids which were thought to walk atop the branches of trees, more similar to monkey.

== Paleoecology and life history ==
The site of Rudabánya, at which the majority of Anapithecus fossils have been discovered, is located in north-eastern Hungary. During the late Miocene, Rudabánya was a humid subtropical forested swamp. A diverse collection of fauna have been collected from Rudabánya, including flying squirrels, tree squirrels, hamsters, weasels, beavers, reptiles, mastodons, rhinoceroses, as well as the primitive "bear-dog" Amphicyon, and the three-toed horse Hippotherium. Anapithecus also shared its habitat with the Miocene ape, Rudapithecus. Although the elongated sharp crested molars of Anapithecus suggest a folivorous diet, more rigorous analyses have determined that both Anapithecus and Rudapithecus were both primarily frugivorous. Anapithecus likely supplemented its diet with leaves, whereas Rudapithecus likely consumed pericarp fruits as a fall back.

Analysis of the enamel micro-structure of Anapithecus shows that its dental development was similar in rate to that of Old World monkeys (particularly macaques). The first lower molar erupts at 1.45 months, then the second and third molars erupt at 2.2 and 3.2 years. This eruption time is faster than any living catarrhine primate of similar size.
