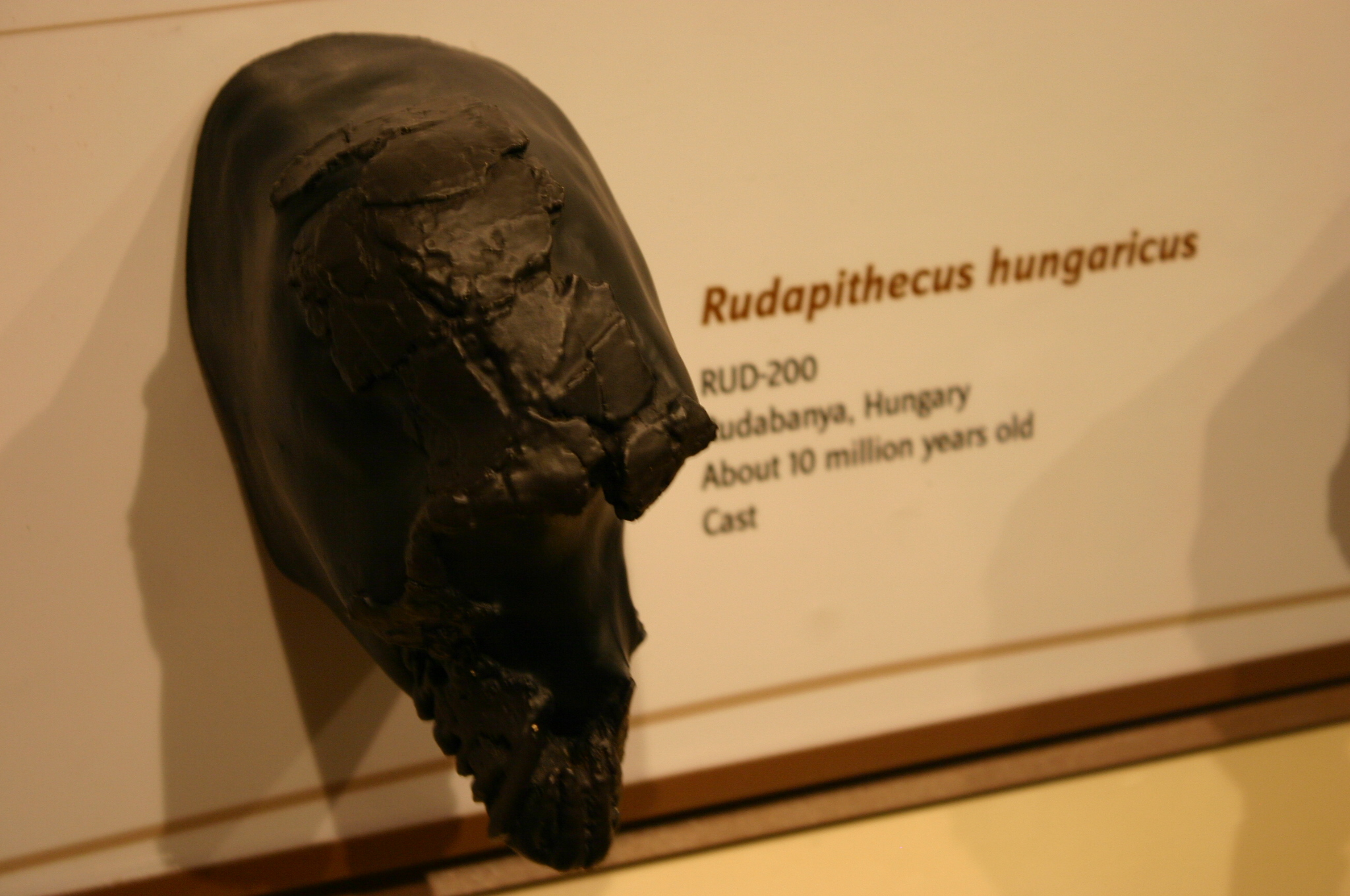
- Skull reconstruction of Rudapithecus hungaricus on display at the Smithsonian Natural History Museum.

Scientific classification
- Kingdom: Animalia
- Phylum: Chordata
- Class: Mammalia
- Order: Primates
- Superfamily: Hominoidea
- Family: Hominidae
- Subfamily: Homininae
- Tribe: †Dryopithecini
- Genus: †Rudapithecus; Kretzoi, 1969
- Species: †R. hungaricus

Binomial name
- †Rudapithecus hungaricus Kretzoi, 1969

= Rudapithecus =

Rudapithecus Temporal range: 10 Ma

Miocene genus of great ape from Europe

Rudapithecus is a chimpanzee-like genus of extinct great apes from the Late Miocene boundary of Europe 10 million years ago (mya). This genus contains one species, Rudapithecus hungaricus.

Rudapithecus is often classified among the Miocene dryopithecine apes in the subfamily Dryopithecinae and displays a combination of anatomical features seen in modern African apes, including aspects of the skull and teeth. Because of these similarities, it is considered an important fossil for understanding the evolution and biogeography of the ancestors of modern great apes and humans during the Miocene.

The first publication of Rudapithecus was in 1969 by Miklós Kretzoi and included a short diagnosis of the genus. Although there were publications of Rudapithecus as early as 1967 in newspapers, these were short and included no diagnosis or type specimen which is why it is considered that the genus was first described Miklós Kretzoi in 1969.

== Etymology ==
The genus name Rudapithecus comes from where it was discovered, in Rudabánya, Northern Hungary, in 1965 and sent to Budapest in 1967. The specific name "hungaricus" refers to Hungary, where it was discovered. The suffix "pithecus" derives from Greek "pithēkos", which means "ape".

== Taxonomy ==
Rudapithecus is classified as part of the extinct great ape tribe, Dryopithecini, along with Hispanopithecus, Dryopithecus, Ouranopithecus, Anoiapithecus, and Pierolapithecus.

The taxonomy of Rudapithecus has been debated, due to its close similarities to other Late Miocene European apes. Originally, since Rudapithecus fossils share many dental and cranial similarities with species such as Dryopithecus brancoi, many researchers reclassified Rudapithecus as part of Dryopithecus.

By the late 20th and early 21st centuries, additional fossil cranial and postcranial remains from Rudabánya provided a larger sample for comparison. These fossils suggested that the Rudabánya apes had a distinctive combination of features relative to other dryopithecines, leading many researchers to again recognize Rudapithecus as a separate genus of European great ape.

The relationship of Rudapithecus to extant African apes and humans is highly debated with several hypothesis currently proposed. Although it is generally accepted that Rudapithecus and the other dryopithecine apes fall within the great ape clade Hominidae it is uncertain whether they are stem hominids, or stem hominines. One hypothesis suggests that Eurasian miocene apes related to dryopithecines dispersed back into Africa in the late Miocene where they contributed to the ancestry of the last common ancestor of African apes and humans (hominines). An alternative hypothesis suggests that the large bodied apes that survived through the Miocene in Africa led to the last common ancestors of African apes and humans instead of the European Miocene apes. The limited fossil record of great apes, high amounts of homoplasy between extinct genera due to adaptations to similar environments, and the lack of diversity in extant great apes makes it difficult to agree on a single hypothesis.

== Description ==
A male Rudapithecus' skull features a lot of attributes similar to that of modern apes. It features a large, long, flat brain case, its face is downwards tilted, and the brain is the same size as that of a chimpanzee of equivalent body mass. Rudapithecus teeth are similar to that of great apes in that they matured slowly and had thin enamel. Its ulna had great ape-like limb proportions, elbow morphology, wrist/hand morphology and strongly curved phalanges which are features that are typically associated with suspensory locomotion. Its humerus is similar to a chimpanzee's, with both sharing a deep trochlear notch allowing for more muscle attachment helping aid in suspensory locomotion.

== Paleobiology ==
=== Locomotion ===
Rudapithecus probably moved among branches like modern apes do now, holding its body upright, and climbing trees with its arms. Rudapithecus hungaricus differed from modern great apes by having a more flexible lumbar, which indicates when Rudapithecus came down to the ground, it might have had the ability to stand upright like humans do. Modern Gorilla, Pan, and Pongo have a long pelvis, and a short lumbar because they are very large animals, which is why they usually walk on all fours. Humans have a longer, more flexible lumbar, which allow humans to stand upright, and walk efficiently on two legs. It is known that Rudapithecus had a more flexible torso than today's apes, because it was much smaller, about the size of a medium-sized dog.

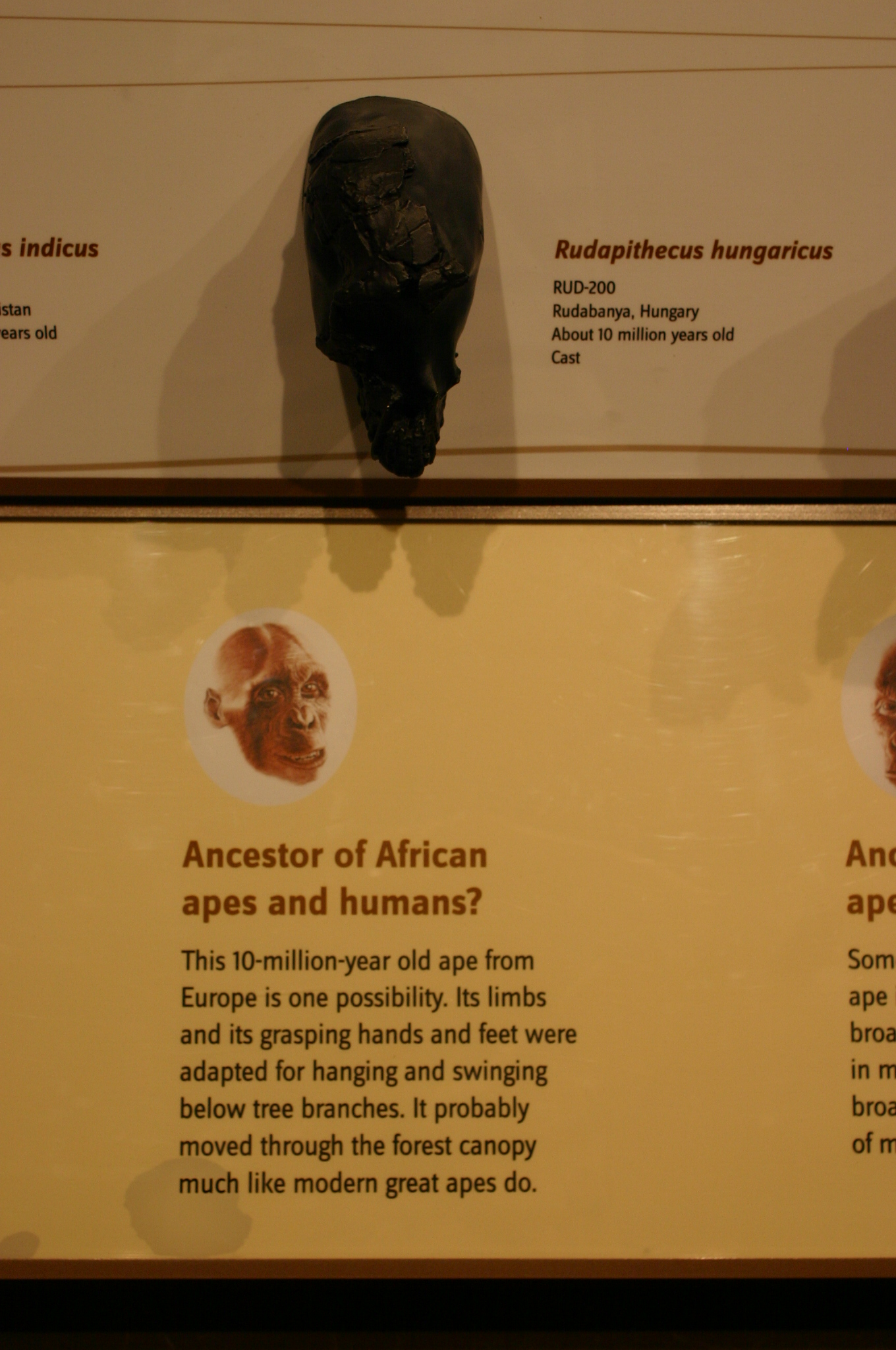
Reconstruction of skull of Rudapithecus hungaricus and description of locomotion.

Wrist bones associated with Rudapithecus hungaricus, the scaphoid and capitate, have been discovered in Rudabánya. These wrist bones have been determined to be supporting evidence that Rudapithecus was primarily arboreal. Analysis of these bones reveal a relatively mobile wrist joint, with similar morphological features in relation to arboreal hominoids. The scaphoid of Rudapithecus had a morphologically with the highest similarity to that of apes, indicating greater range of wrist mobility. Moreover, the scaphoid was not fused together with the os centrale, which suggests that Rudapithecus possessed a more ancestral and primitive wrist structure. The capitate of Rudapithecus exhibits general arboreal morphology as well as enhanced mobility, typically observed in apes. Collectively, the wrist bones of Rudapithecus suggest that they possessed a flexible and mobile wrist, well adapted for substantial arboreal activity.

Two fragments of a pelvis from a Rudapithecus individual were recovered and suggest that Rudapithecus may have had orthograde locomotion. This is because the pelvic bones of Rudapithecus more closely resemble modern extant great apes which have orthograde (upright) posture as opposed to monkeys which tend to have pronograde (horizontal) posture. One feature of the pelvic bone that suggests upright suspensory locomotion is the shallow acetabulum which would provide a greater range of movement of the legs and hips which is important for climbing and moving between branches. This shallow acetabulum is also seen in modern Orangutans and Gibbons which use this flexibility for climbing and bridging between branches and is not seen in modern monkeys. The shape of the hip joint surface also suggests Rudapithecus has an orthograde posture as it is similar to what is seen in modern apes suggesting a similar load distribution on the pelvis consistent with orthograde posture.

=== Diet ===
Rudapithecus was likely a frugivore. Their dental morphology displays thin enamel, suggesting that they ate soft fruit. Incisor morpholgy indicates consistent dietary overlap between Rudapithecus and Anapithecus. Rudapithecus may have processed tougher fruit resources (e.g. protective fruit pericarps) compared to Anapithecus, due to elevated compressive loads observed at anterior incisor regions, suggesting specialization for processing food.

Rudapithecus likely had shearing-dominated chewing movements; they sliced or sheared food rather than crushed it. The wear facets in their teeth indicate well-organized dynamic occlusion, with clear complementary facets between upper and lower teeth. These facets correspond to lateral (side-to-side) jaw movements during the power stroke.

The occlusal pattern suggests that they had moderate chewing forces. They likely had efficient processing of tough but not extremely hard foods, such as fibrous foods like fruits and possibly soft plant tissues. Their teeth do not show specialization for hard-object feeding.

=== Behavior ===
Direct evidence for the behavior of Rudapithecus is limited.There is large size differences between specimens with body mass estimates ranging from 20-40 kg for different individuals. The smaller individuals have been suggested as being females suggesting a degree of sexual dimorphisms in Rudapithecus. In living primates pronounced sexual dimorphism is frequently associated with a higher degree of male-male competition and polygynous mating systems. Although this is commonly seen in extant primate species it is difficult to determine whether it is the case for Rudapithecus based on fossils alone.

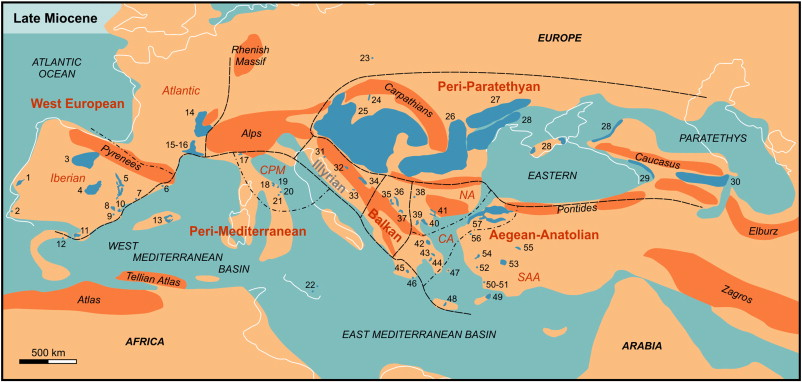
A map of Late Miocene Europe

== Paleoecology ==
Rudabánya deposits were positioned in a shallow valley that opened outward into the Pannonian Lake. Flucuations in lake level caused the environment to be heterogenous, ranging from dry land, lake, and swamp conditions.

Dental microwear indicates that both Rudapithecus and its contemporary Anapithecus were folivorous at the site of Rudabánya. However, Rudapithecus microwear is characterised by higher fractal complexity values, suggesting that it consumed harder fruits than Anapithecus and thus may have engaged in niche partitioning with the pliopithecid.
