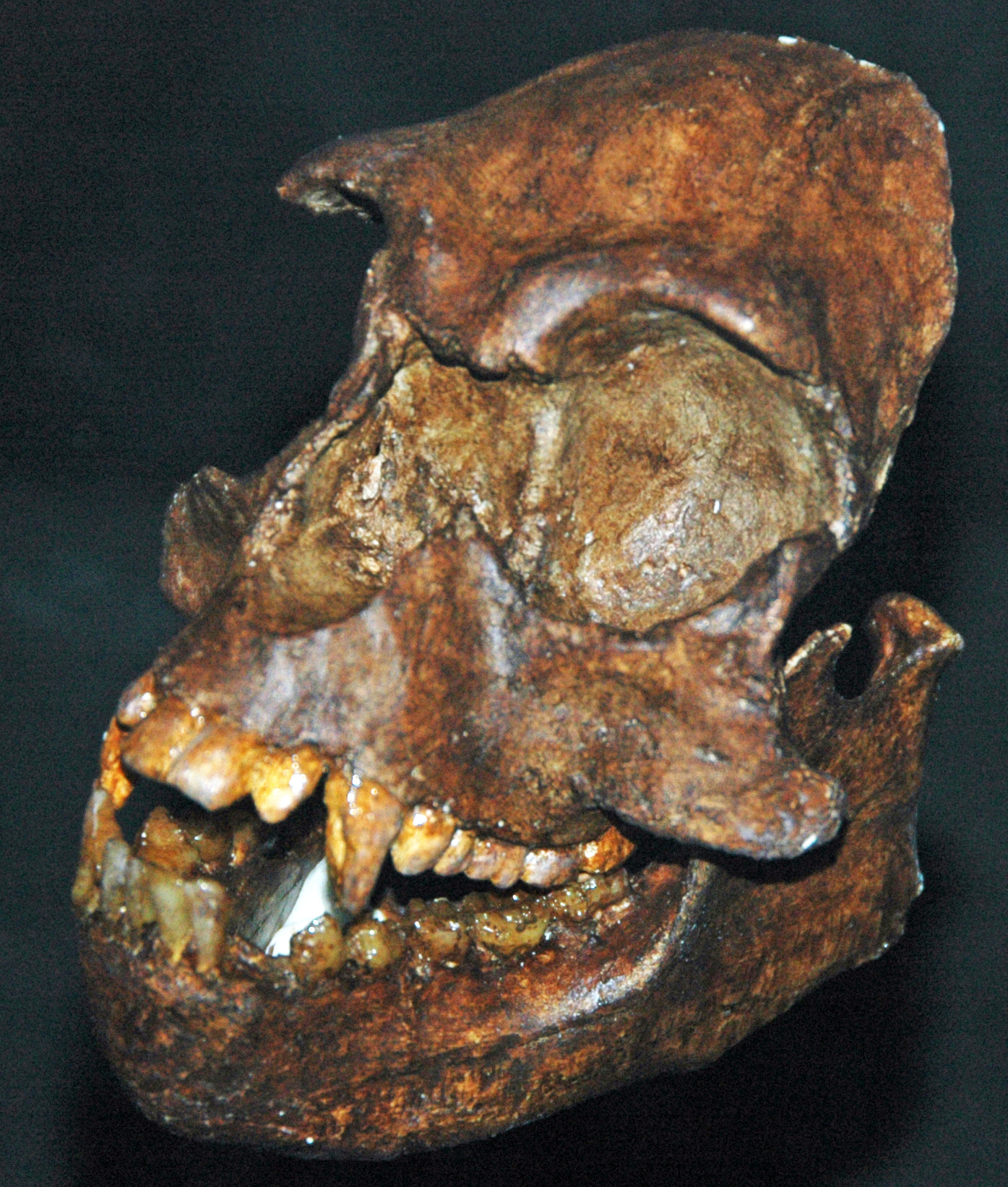
- Epipliopithecus skull

Scientific classification
- Kingdom: Animalia
- Phylum: Chordata
- Class: Mammalia
- Order: Primates
- Parvorder: Catarrhini
- Superfamily: †Pliopithecoidea

Families, subfamilies & unplaced genera
- Dionysopithecidae; Pliopithecidae; Crouzeliinae; Paidopithex; Krishnapithecus; Kapi

= Pliopithecoidea =

Pliopithecoidea Temporal range: Middle Miocene–Late Miocene

Extinct superfamily of primates

Pliopithecoidea is an extinct superfamily of catarrhine primates that inhabited Asia and Europe during the Miocene. Although they were once a widespread and diverse group of primates, the pliopithecoids have no living descendants.

== History of discovery ==
The first fossil specimens attributed to Pliopithecoidea were discovered by Édouard Lartet in Sansan, France in 1837. These fossils were later referenced by Henri Marie Ducrotay de Blainville in 1839, who named the type species Pliopithecus antiquus. A second species, Pliopithecus platyodon, was discovered in Switzerland by Biedermann in 1863. Following this, a small number of other pliopithecoid species were described from fossil collections found in France, Germany, and Poland.

In the mid-twentieth century, paleontologists Johannes Hürzeler and Helmuth Zapfe reinvigorated interest in the pliopithecoids with a series of publications in which they named a number of new species, including Pliopithecus vindobonensis, which consists of the most complete cranial and post-cranial pliopithecoid specimens ever discovered. Based on their size, and some superficial similarities to modern day gibbons, Zapfe suggested that pliopithecoids were ancestral to the Hylobatidae lineage.

With the discovery of more European pliopithecoid fossils in the mid to late 1970s, and subsequent discovery of pliopithecoid fossils in China, the idea that pliopithecoids were ancestral to gibbons fell out of favor. Today, most paleontologists agree that pliopithecoids hold a basal position in the catarrhine family tree. As such, pliopithecoids represent something similar to the common ancestor of Old World monkeys and apes.

A femur discovered in Eppelsheim and given the genus name Paidopithex was for many years controversial, as its large size compared to Pliopithecoids led to suggestions that it was instead related to the Dryopithecini. A lack of femurs for Dryopithecini meant that the suggestion was not ruled out for many years, but in 2002 work by Köhler et al comparing it to a recently discovered Dryopithecus laietanus skeleton showed that it was very different from the Dryopithecini. However, Köhler felt unable to definitely place Paidopithex in the Pliopithecoid superfamily, stating it was either an unusually large Pliopithecoid (estimated bodyweight 22 kg) or could be the sole known species of a separate superfamily.

A worn tooth found near Haritalyangar in India and dated from around 9 to 8 million years ago has been suggested as possibly a Pliopithecoid species, Krishnapithecus krishnai, but the wear has made this difficult to determine. However, two recently discovered molars in the same area appear to support this, with placement within the superfamily uncertain (but clearly not Crouzeliinae).

== Physical characteristics ==
The pliopithecoid fossil record mostly consists of teeth with a few mandibular and maxillary fragments. The dental formula (2.1.2.3) and shape of the teeth are the primary factors which include pliopithecoids among the catarrhini. Although some authors have argued that the narrow upper molars and broad upper molars of pliopithecoids demonstrate their affinity with modern catarrhines, others have demonstrated that these traits are variable between species. In fact, pliopithecoids are more similar to New World monkeys in some aspects of their dentition, including narrow lower incisors (mesiodistally waisted towards the base of the crown). Many species have what is often referred to as a 'pliopithecine triangle', a subtle set of ridges defining a small triangular shaped pit between the protocone and hypocone of the lower molars, but even this trait is variable. Instead, the most defining dental trait present in all pliopithecoids is a tall crowned lower third premolar, which is relatively triangular in outline with a comparatively short, vertically oriented mesiobucal face.

The crania of P. vindobonesis, Laccopithecus robustus, Pliopithecus zhanxiangi, and Anapithecus hernyaki demonstrate that pliopithecoids had relatively large and globular braincases with a projecting snout. The snout projects less than the propliopithecoids of North Africa (i.e. Aegyptopithecus), suggesting some prognathic reduction from the inferred common ancestor of these two primate families. The orbits are widely spaced and the mandible is long and robust, with a relatively broad ramus. Most importantly, however, pliopithecoids had an incompletely ossified ectotympanic tube. This anatomical feature represents an intermediate stage between what is found in platyrrhines, which do not have an ossified ectotympanic tube, and catarrhines, which have a completely ossified ectotympanic tube.

Nearly all of what is known about the body proportions and post-cranial morphology of this family are derived from Pliopithecus vindobonensis, as it is the only species for which a complete skeleton has been found. Still, the majority of fossil material indicates that pliopithecoids were medium sized primates, approximately the size of a howler monkey or a gibbon (8 kg). Köhler estimates a slightly higher average weight of 10 kg. Post-cranially, pliopithecoids had an interesting mix of platyrrhine and catarrhine traits. The brachial index of P. vindobonesis (the length of the radius divided by the length of the humerus) is similar to that of a howler monkey, but the crural index (the length of the tibia divided by the length of the femur) is similar to that of a gibbon. Proportionally, however, the forelimbs of P. vindobonesis were shorter than their hindlimbs, making them comparable to a baboon. The hands and feet of P. vindobonesis were long and curved, suggesting that pliopithecoids were adept and agile climbers. The post-crania of P. vindobonesis also shows that Pliopithecoids had an entepicondylar foramen, which is a primitive trait not found in any other catarrhine primates (extant or extinct). The wrist and hands of pliopithecoids were seemingly much more similar to platyrrhines than to catarrhines, as the carpo-metacarpal joint of the thumb is a modified "hinge joint" compared to the "saddle-like" thumb joint found in Old World monkeys and apes. Pliopithecoids also had a tail.

== Classification ==
The following classification scheme represents multiple sources.

- Order Primates (Linnaeus, 1758)
  - Infraorder Catarrhini (Geoffroy Saint-Hilaire, 1812)
    - Superfamily Pliopithecoidea (Zapfe, 1960)
      - Family Pliopithecidae (Zapfe, 1960)
        - Subfamily Dionysopithecinae (Li, 1978)
          - Genus Dionysopithecus (Li, 1978)
            - Dionysopithecus shuangoeuensis (Li, 1978)
            - Dionysopithecus orientalis (Suteethorn, 1990)
          - Genus Platodontopithecus (Li, 1978)
            - Platodontopithecus jianghuaiensis (Gu and Lin, 1983)
        - Subfamily Pliopithecinae (Zapfe, 1960)
          - Genus Pliopithecus (Gervais, 1849)
            - Pliopithecus antiquus (Blainville, 1839)
            - Pliopithecus piveteaui (Hürzeler, 1954) (Note: P. piveteaui is considered a junior synonym of P. antiquus (Bergounioux and Crouzel, 1965; Harrison, 1991; Andrews et al., 1996), and as a distinct species by Begun (2002).)
            - Pliopithecus platydon (Biederman, 1863)
            - Pliopithecus zhanxiangi (Harrison, Delson, and Guan, 1991)
            - Pliopithecus bii (Yu, Jin, Jie 2003)
            - Pliopithecus canmatensis (Alba, Moyá-Solá, Robles, Galindo, 2012)
          - Genus Epipliopithecus (Zapfe and Hürzeler, 1957)
            - Epipliopithecus vindobonensis (Zapfe and Hürzeler, 1957)
        - Subfamily Crouzeliinae (Ginsburg, 1975)
          - Tribe Crouzeliini (Ginsburg, 1975)
            - Genus Plesiopliopithecus (Zapfe, 1961)
              - Pleisopliopithecus auscitanensis (Ginsburg, 1975) (Note: Ginsburg (1975) and Moyá-Solá et al. (2001) recognize P. auscitanensis and P. rhodancia as a distinct genus, Crouzelia.)
              - Pleisopliopithecus rhondanica (Ginsburg and Mein, 1980)
              - Pleisopliopithecus lockeri (Zapfe, 1961)
              - Pleisopliopithecus priensis (Welcomme, Aguilar, and Ginsburg, 1991) (Note: P. priensis is placed into Pliopithecus by Andrews et al. (1996) and Moyá-Solá et al. (2001), but it has since been moved into Pleisopliopithecus by Begun (2002) and Harrison (2013))
          - Tribe Anapithecini (Kretzoi, 1975)
            - Genus Anapithecus (Kretzoi, 1975)
              - Anapithecus hernyaki (Kretzoi, 1975)
            - Genus Laccopithecus (Wu & Pan, 1984)
              - Laccopithecus robustus (Wu and Pan, 1984)
            - Genus Barberapithecus (Alba and Moyá-Solá, 2012)
              - Barberapithecus huerzeleri (Alba and Moyá-Solá, 2012)
            - Genus Egarapithecus (Moyá-Solá, Köhler, and Alba, 2001)
              - Egarapithecus narcisoi (Moyá-Solá, Köhler, and Alba, 2001)
        - incertae sedis
          - Genus Paidopithex (Pohlig, 1895)
          - Genus Krishnapithecus
          - Genus Kapi

Begun divides Pliopithecoidea into two - Family Dionysopithecidae and Family Pliopithecidae, with the Pliopithecidae sub-divided into Subfamilies Pliopithecinae and Crouzeliinae.
