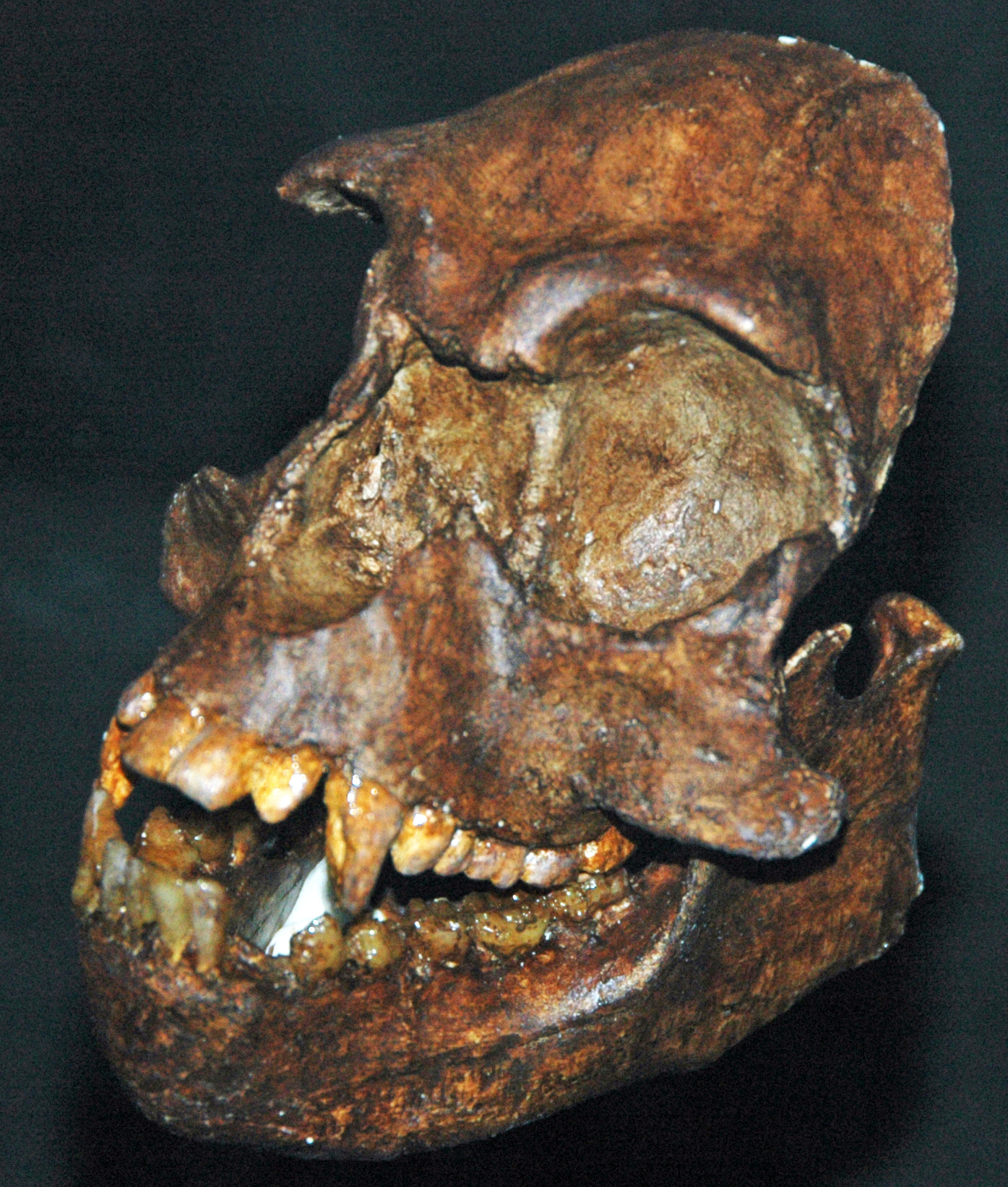
- Epipliopithecus skull

Scientific classification
- Domain: Eukaryota
- Kingdom: Animalia
- Phylum: Chordata
- Class: Mammalia
- Order: Primates
- Suborder: Haplorhini
- Infraorder: Simiiformes
- Family: †Pliopithecidae
- Subfamily: †Pliopithecinae
- Genus: †Epipliopithecus; Zapfe & Hürzeler, 1957
- Species: †E. vindobonensis

Binomial name
- †Epipliopithecus vindobonensis Zapfe & Hürzeler, 1957

= Epipliopithecus =

Epipliopithecus Temporal range: Middle Miocene ~15.5 Ma

Extinct genus of primates

Epipliopithecus vindobonensis is an extinct species of pliopithecoid primate recovered from the Middle Miocene deposits of Devínska Nová Ves fissure in western Slovakia. Epipliopithecus is one of the few pliopithecoids for which both cranial and post-cranial fossil material has been recovered. Most pliopithecoids are known only from fossilized teeth, whereas Epipliopithecus is known from three nearly complete skeletons. As such, Epipliopithecus has greatly informed the modern understanding of pliopithecoid anatomy, locomotion, and phylogeny.

== History of discovery ==
Epipliopithecus was discovered and described by Helmuth Zapfe and Johannes Hürzeler. The fossil material was found in a fissure deposit near Devínska Nová Ves (Slovakia) in the southern part of the Carpathian Mountains. The rock surrounding the fissure is limestone and dolomite of Jurassic age. The fissure deposit itself is clearly much younger, as has been demonstrated to date to the lower middle Miocene (Helvetian), approximately 15.5 million years old.

Zapfe and Hürzeler originally gave the specimens the name Pliopithecus (Epipliopithecus) vindobonensis. Epipliopithecus denoted a sub-generic distinction which implied that this species was ancestral to later pliopithecoids like Pliopithecus antiquus and Pliopithecus platyodon. With the subsequent discovery of many more pliopithecoid species across Eurasia, the precise phylogeny of these species has become less certain. Given the unique morphology of Epipliopithecus, however, researchers have elevated Epliopithecus from a sub-genus to a genus.

== Anatomy and phylogeny ==
Epipliopithecus has a number of morphological characters that demonstrate its primitive phylogenetic position relative to living catarrhines. One of these most notable characters is found in the outer ear morphology of Epipliopithecus. New World monkeys and basal anthropoids (i.e. Aegyptopithecus, Parapithecus, and Apidium) have a bony ectotympanic ring, whereas crown catarrhines (Old World monkeys and apes) have a completely ossified ectotympanic tube. Epipliopithecus possesses an intermediate morphology in the form of a partially ossified ectotympanic tube. Some authors have argued this morphology is best interpreted as an intermediate evolutionary step between an ectotympanic ring and ectotympanic tube. Others have suggested it may be an intermediate developmental morphology, as a similar condition is seen in some extant juvenile catarrhines.

The snout of Epipliopithecus is reduced in length compared to earlier catarrhines like Aegyptopithecus. The crania is globular shape, somewhat similar to a gibbon. These traits, combined with seemingly similar dental characteristics, led some early researchers to suggest a close evolutionary relationship between Pliopithecoidea and Hylobates. This hypothesis has largely fallen out of favor, mostly because of the primitive nature of the skeleton of Epipliopithecus.

Epipliopithecus had a tail, and although this trait is shared by some crown catarrhines (Old World Monkeys), it excludes pliopithecoids from Hominoidea. Moreover, Epipliopithecus has an extremely primitive elbow with intercondylar foramen. This morphology does not allow for the arm to be fully extended as in suspensory hominoids like chimpanzees, orangutans, or gibbons. Combined with a hinge-like thumb joint, similar to the condition seen in New World monkeys, these traits suggest that Epipliopithecus was a quadruped who moved atop tree branches similar to small and medium-sized monkeys.

Epipliopithecus can be distinguished from other pliopithecoids by a number of unique dental traits. It is considerably larger than the type species, Pliopithecus antiquus. Epipliopithecus also has higher-crowned incisors, and upper central incisors with a notched lingual cingulum. The trigon base on the lower molars is also considerably reduced, as is buccal cingulum of the upper molars. Epipliopithecus lacks the triangle structures which are characteristic of most pliopithecoids.
