= Krishnapithecus =

Krishnapithecus Temporal range: Late Miocene Miocene

Scientific classification
- Kingdom: Animalia
- Phylum: Chordata
- Class: Mammalia
- Order: Primates
- Family: †Krishnapithecidae
- Genus: †Krishnapithecus; Ginsburg and Mein, 1980

Species
- †Krishnapithecus krishnaii

Extinct genus of primates

Krishnapithecus is a genus of extinct primate related to Old World monkeys that lived around 9 million years ago during the Late Miocene. It has only one species, K. krishnaii. Discovered from the Sivalik Hills, India, in 1979, it was originally identified from a single tooth (upper middle premolar) as a member of Pliopithecus, a genus of ape-related primates described in 1849. The unique features led to a creation of new genus Krishnapithecus in 1980. Based on better specimens, the exact species identity was discovered in 2017. It is the first known pliopithecoid (ape-like primate) from South Asia.

== Discovery and naming ==
Between 1967 and 1969, Elwyn L. Simons from Yale University conducted a fossil exploration of the Sivalik Hills, a mountain range that covers northern India, Pakistan and Nepal. He was joined by S.R.K. Chopra, founder of the Department of Anthropology in Panjab University. By 1969, Simons and Chopra collected several fossils of primates, including a new species of Pliocene primate from Haritalyangar, India, which they described as Gigantopithecus bilaspurensis. Around the same time, independent explorers, Philip D. Gingerich of the University of Michigan and Ashok Sahni of the University of Lucknow, discovered two new primate fossils, named Indraloris and Sivaladapis from the neighbouring regions in India and Pakistan.

Chopra continued the exploration and made several additional discoveries during the next decade. In 1978, he made a brief report in the Journal of Human Evolution on a new fossil collected from Haritalyangar in Himachal Pradesh, northwestern India, which he described as "a Miocene gibbon-like small ape" and gave the name Pliopithecus krishnaii, after Krishna, a Supreme God in Hinduism. In 1979, with S. Kaul, he published the full description in the same journal as "A new species of Pliopithecus from the Indian S̀ivaliks". The fossil collected from Haritalyangar was a single tooth which was heavily worn, making the identification difficult. Chopra and Kaul made a report on the discovery as:

[The fossil was] an isolated upper third molar of a gibbon-like primate, the first of its kind ever found from the S̀ivalik hills. The tooth comes from the Nagri beds comparable to the Middle Miocene Formations. This tooth has been assigned to a new species of Pliopithecus, namely P. krishnaii, on the basis of morphological and metrical comparisons with the fossil gibbon-like primates and living gibbons.

In 1980, the specimen was examined by French palaeontologists, Léonard Ginsburg (at the Muséum National d'Histoire Naturelle de Paris) and Pierre Mein (at the University of Lyon), who identified it as belonging to a distinct species more closely related to apes than to gibbons, and gave a created a new genus name, Krishnapithecus. The species thus became Krishnapithecus krishnaii.

In 2012, Anek R. Sankhyan of the Anthropological Survey of India and Palaeo Research Society collected two teeth from Haritalyangar. Much better that Chopra's specimens, it was still difficult to analyse because they appeared to be from young individuals. With the help of Jay Kelley (affiliated to Smithsonian Institution, Arizona State University and Harvard University) and Terry Harrison (at New York University), Sankhyan was able to identify that the fossils were lower molar germs (unerupted and developing teeth) from two juveniles. The three scientists made an initial reported on the dental analysis in Current Science in April 2017 stating that the specimens may belong to K. krishnaii. They made systematic measurements and comparisons with other available primate fossils, from which they confirmed the species as a pliopithecoid (literally "more ape"), the first of such ape-like primates known in South Asia. With a complete taxonomic description reported in the Journal of Human Evolution, they also created a new family Krishnapithecidae for the species.

== Description ==
The first specimens collected by Chopra was in bad condition that not much of analysis and description could be done with it. The new specimens found by Sankhyan gave a clearer understanding of the species. Sankhyan's specimens were both lower teeth, second left molar from one individual and first right molar from another individual. The undeveloped teeth indicated that the individuals were infants. The entire teeth were well preserved showing the different parts intact. They are most similar to those of siamangs, the gibbons in Southeast Asia, among living species, and by reconstruction, their body shape and size would be most comparable. They are supposed to be slightly bigger that the siamangs (having body weight around 9 to 13 kg), thus their weight is estimated to about 15 kg, possibly making them the largest pliopithecoid that ever lived.

The teeth are 8–9 mm in length. The crowns are fully formed but the roots are yet to develop, which indicate that the teeth are undeveloped and belong to very young individuals. The species found in India shows that the primitive apes were distributed throughout Asia and Europe during the Miocene, from about 18 million year ago to 7 million years ago. As several other primates had been discovered in Haritalyangar, the region must be an attractive habitat throughout the Miocene. According to Sankhyan, the species is most likely in the ancestral group of siamangs. The species lived alongside species of Sivapithecus and Indopithecus that are found within the Sivalik Hills, which indicates that the geographical area is the place of origin of the Asian apes.
