= Dionysopithecidae =

Dionysopithecidae Temporal range: 18–17 Million years ago

Scientific classification
- Kingdom: Animalia
- Phylum: Chordata
- Class: Mammalia
- Order: Primates
- Suborder: Haplorhini
- Infraorder: Simiiformes
- Parvorder: Catarrhini
- Superfamily: †Pliopithecoidea
- Family: †Dionysopithecidae

Genera
- Dionysopithecus; Platodontopithecus

Extinct family of primates

Dionysopithecidae is an extinct family of fossil catarrhines and the earliest-known and most primitive members of the Pliopithecoidea superfamily, with fossils in Sihong, China dating to 18–17 million years ago for species Dionysopithecus shuangouensis and Platodontopithecus jianghuaiensis.

A single lower molar found in Ban San Klang in Thailand is similar to those found in Sihong but sufficiently different to be considered a different species, Dionysopithecus orientalis.

They are sometimes treated as a subfamily of Pliopithecidae as 'Dionysopithecinae'.
