= Laccopithecus =

Laccopithecus Temporal range: Messinian

Scientific classification
- Kingdom: Animalia
- Phylum: Chordata
- Class: Mammalia
- Order: Primates
- Family: †Pliopithecidae
- Subfamily: †Crouzeliinae
- Genus: †Laccopithecus
- Species: †L. robustus

Binomial name
- †Laccopithecus robustus Wu and Pan, 1984

Extinct genus of pliopithecid primate

Laccopithecus is an extinct monotypic genus of crouzeliine primate that lived in China during the Messinian stage of the Miocene epoch.

== Palaeobiology ==
The shearing crests on the molars of this genus were poorly developed, and the animal's bunodont dentition suggests it was predominantly frugivorous. Sexual dimorphism was moderate in the case of canine size, but body mass dimorphism was low.
