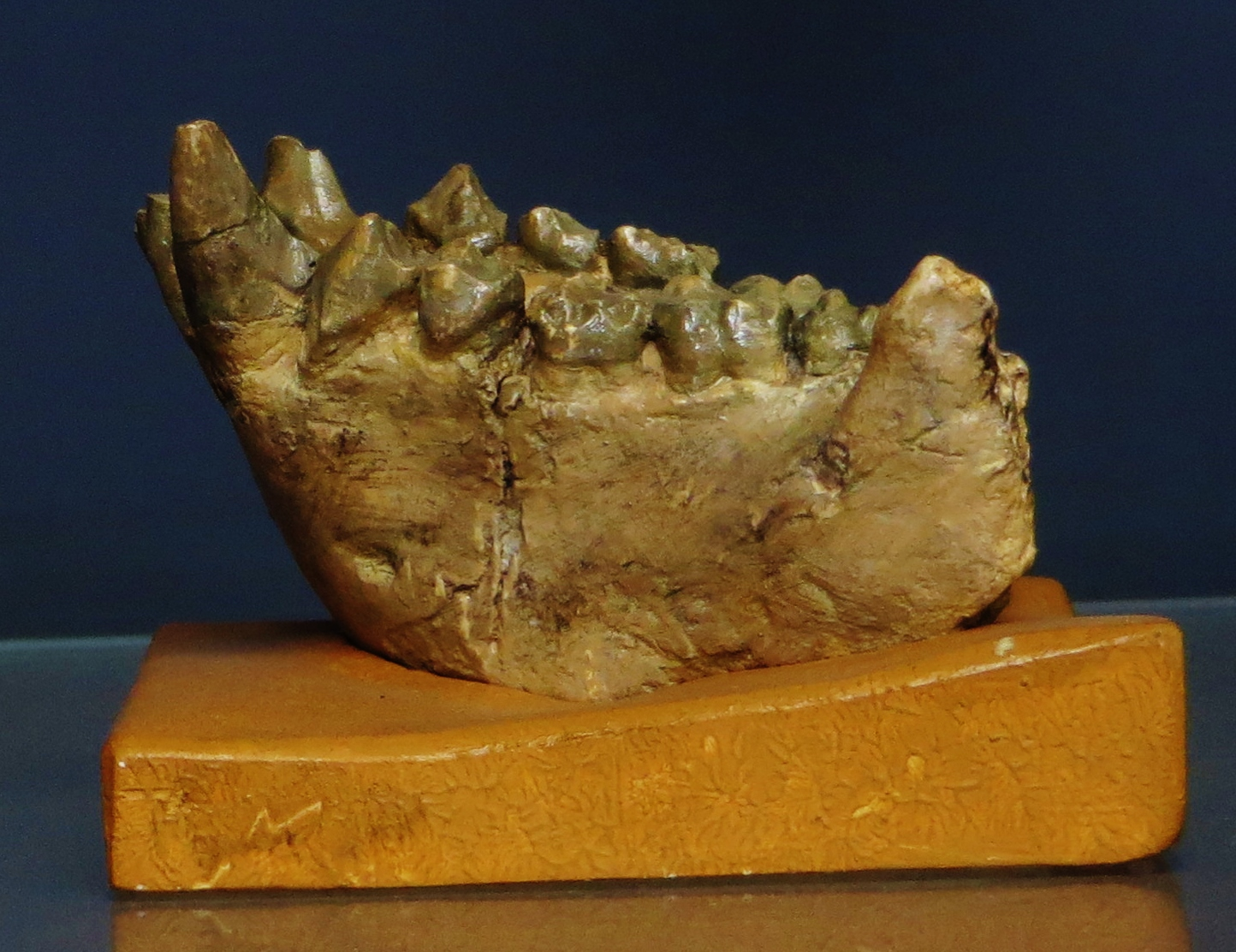
- Mandible fragment of D. fontani from Saint-Gaudens, France (Middle Miocene, 11.5 mya); cast from Museum national d'histoire naturelle, Paris

Scientific classification
- Kingdom: Animalia
- Phylum: Chordata
- Class: Mammalia
- Order: Primates
- Superfamily: Hominoidea
- Family: Hominidae
- Tribe: †Dryopithecini
- Genus: †Dryopithecus; Lartet, 1856

Species
- †D. fontani Lartet, 1856; ?†D. carinthiacus Mottl, 1957

= Dryopithecus =

Dryopithecus Temporal range: Serravallian–Tortonian 12.5–11.1 Ma

Extinct great ape from Europe

Dryopithecus is a genus of extinct great apes from the middle–late Miocene boundary of Europe 12.5 to 11.1 million years ago (mya). Since its discovery in 1856, the genus has been subject to taxonomic turmoil, with numerous new species being described from single remains based on minute differences amongst each other, and the fragmentary nature of the holotype specimen makes differentiating remains difficult. There is currently only one uncontested species, the type species D. fontani, though there may be more. The genus is placed into the tribe Dryopithecini, which is either an offshoot of orangutans, African apes, or is its own separate branch.

A male specimen was estimated to have weighed 44 kg (97 lb) in life. Dryopithecus likely predominantly ate ripe fruit from trees, suggesting a degree of suspensory behaviour to reach them, though the anatomy of a humerus and femur suggest a greater reliance on walking on all fours (quadrupedalism). The face was similar to gorillas, and males had longer canines than females, which is typically correlated with high levels of aggression. They lived in a seasonal, paratropical climate, and may have built up fat reserves for winter. European great apes likely went extinct during a drying and cooling trend in the Late Miocene which caused the retreat of warm-climate forests.

== Etymology ==
The genus name Dryopithecus comes from Ancient Greek δρῦς (drûs) 'oak tree' and πίθηκος (píthēkos) 'ape' because the authority believed it inhabited an oak or pine forest in an environment similar to modern day Europe. The species D. fontani was named in honour of its discoverer, local collector Monsieur Alfred Fontan.

== Taxonomy ==
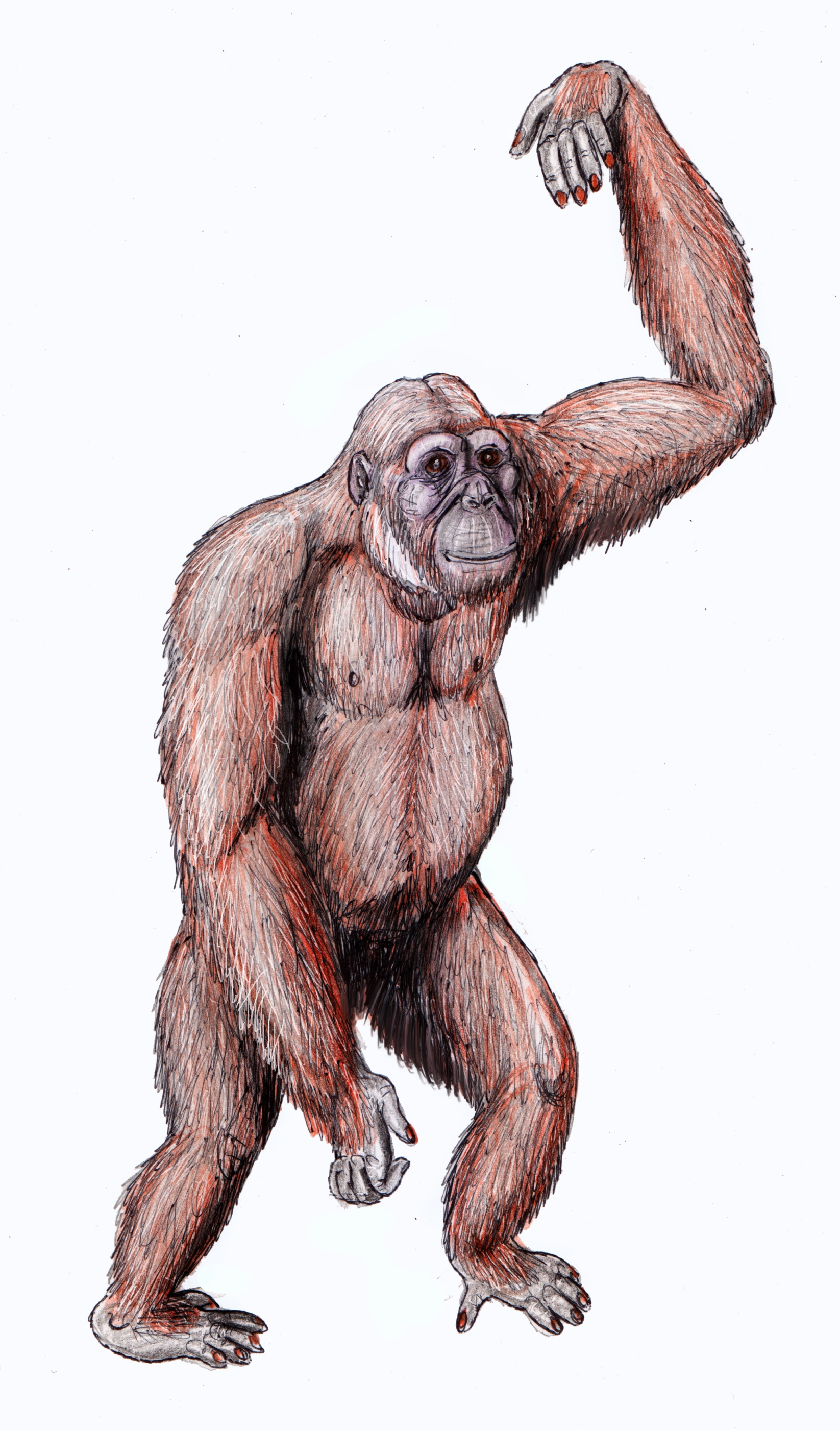
Restoration of D. fontani with an orangutan-like build

The first Dryopithecus fossils were described from the French Pyrenees by French paleontologist Édouard Lartet in 1856, three years before Charles Darwin published his On the Origin of Species. Subsequent authors noted similarities to modern African great apes. In his The Descent of Man, Darwin briefly noted that Dryopithecus casts doubt on the African origin of apes:

...it is somewhat more probable that our early progenitors lived on the African continent than elsewhere. But it is useless to speculate on this subject; for two or three anthropomorphous apes, one the Dryopithecus of Lartet, nearly as large as a man, and closely allied to Hylobates, existed in Europe during the Miocene age; and since so remote a period the earth has certainly undergone many great revolutions, and there has been ample time for migration on the largest scale.

Dryopithecus taxonomy has been the subject of much turmoil, with new specimens being the basis of a new species or genus based on minute differences, resulting in several now-defunct species. By the 1960s, all non-human apes were classified into the now-obsolete family Pongidae, and extinct apes into Dryopithecidae. In 1965, English palaeoanthropologist David Pilbeam and American palaeontologist Elwyn L. Simons separated the genus–which included specimens from across the Old World at the time–into three subgenera: Dryopithecus in Europe, Sivapithecus in Asia, and Proconsul in Africa. Afterwards, there was discussion over whether each of these subgenera should be elevated to genus. In 1979, Sivapithecus was elevated to genus, and Dryopithecus was subdivided again into the subgenera Dryopithecus in Europe, and Proconsul, Limnopithecus, and Rangwapithecus in Africa. Since that time, several more species were assigned and moved, and by the 21st century, the genus included D. fontani, D. brancoi, D. laietanus, and D. crusafonti. However, the 2009 discovery of a partial skull of D. fontani caused many of them to be split off into different genera, such as the newly erected Hispanopithecus, because part of the confusion was caused by the fragmentary nature of the Dryopithecus holotype with vague and incomplete diagnostic characteristics.

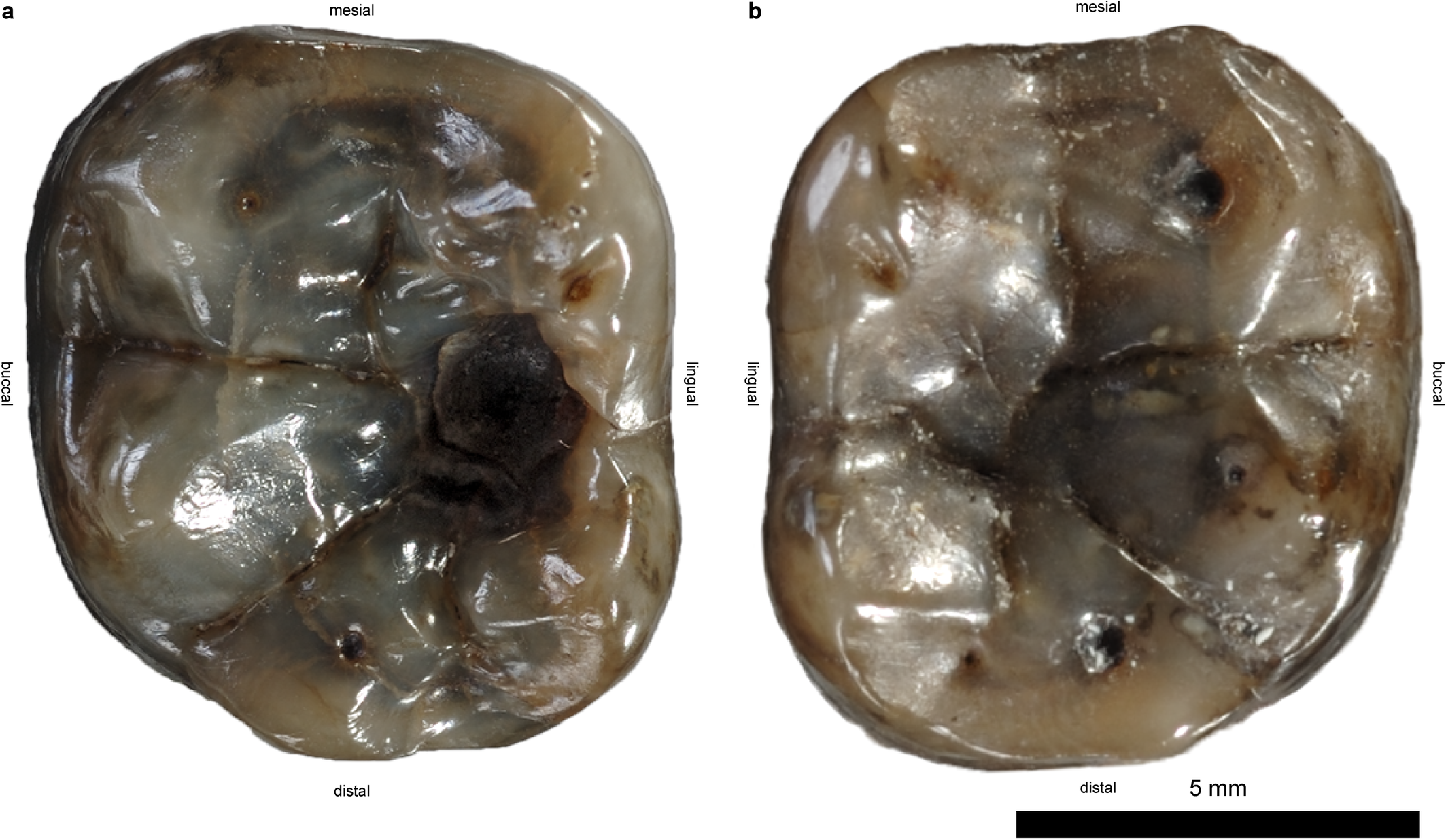
The lower molars of "D. carinthiacus"

Currently, there is only one uncontested species, D. fontani. Specimens are:

- Holotype MNHNP AC 36, three pieces of a male mandible with teeth from Saint-Gaudens in the French Pyrenees. Based on dental development in chimpanzees, it was 6 to 8 years old, and several diagnostic characteristics made from the holotype would be lost in mature D. fontani; A partial left humerus arm bone, an additional mandible (MNHNP 1872-2), a left lower jaw and five isolated teeth are also known from the site.
- An upper incisor, NMB G.a.9., and female upper molar, FSL 213981, come from Saint-Alban-de-Roche, France.
- A male partial face, IPS35026, and femur, IPS41724, from Vallès Penedès in Catalonia, Spain.
- A female mandible with teeth, LMK-Pal 5508, from St. Stefan, Carinthia, Austria 12.5 mya, which could possibly be considered a separate species, "D. carinthiacus".

Dryopithecus is classified into the namesake great ape tribe Dryopithecini, along with Hispanopithecus, Rudapithecus, Ouranopithecus, Anoiapithecus, and Pierolapithecus, though the latter two may belong to Dryopithecus, the former two may be synonymous, and the former three can also be placed into their own tribes. Dryopithecini is either regarded as an offshoot of orangutans (Ponginae), an ancestor to African apes and humans (Homininae), or its own separate branch (Dryopithecinae).

Dryopithecus was a part of an adaptive radiation of great apes in the expanding forests of Europe in the warm climates of the Miocene Climatic Optimum, possibly descending from early or middle Miocene African apes which diversified in the proceeding Middle Miocene disruption (a cooling event). It is possible great apes first evolved in Europe or Asia, and then migrated down into Africa.

== Description ==
Based on measurements of the femoral head of the Spanish IPS41724, the living weight for a male Dryopithecus was estimated to be 44 kg (97 lb).

Dryopithecus teeth are most similar to those of modern chimps. The teeth are small and have a thin enamel layer. Dryopithecus has a slender jaw, indicating it was not well-suited for eating abrasive or hard food. Like modern apes, the males have pronounced canine teeth. The molars are wide, and the premolars wider. It has a wide roof of the mouth, a long muzzle (prognathism), and a large nose which is oriented nearly vertically to the face. In total, the face shows many similarities to the gorilla; since early to middle Miocene African apes do not share such similarities, gorilla-like features likely evolved independently in Dryopithecus rather than as a result of close affinities.

The humerus, measuring an approximate 265 mm (10.4 in), is similar in size and form to the bonobo. Like in bonobos, the shaft bows outward, and the insertion for the triceps and deltoids was poorly developed, suggesting Dryopithecus was not as adept to suspensory behaviour as orangutans. The femoral neck, which connects the femoral head to the femoral shaft, is not very long nor steep; the femoral head is positioned low to the greater trochanter; and the lesser trochanter is positioned more towards the backside. All these characteristics are important in the mobility of the hip joint, and indicate a quadrupedal mode of locomotion rather than suspensory. However, fruit trees in the time and area of the Austrian Dryopithecus were typically 5 to 12 m (16 to 39 ft) high and bore fruit on thinner terminal branches, suggesting suspensory behaviour to reach them.

== Paleobiology ==
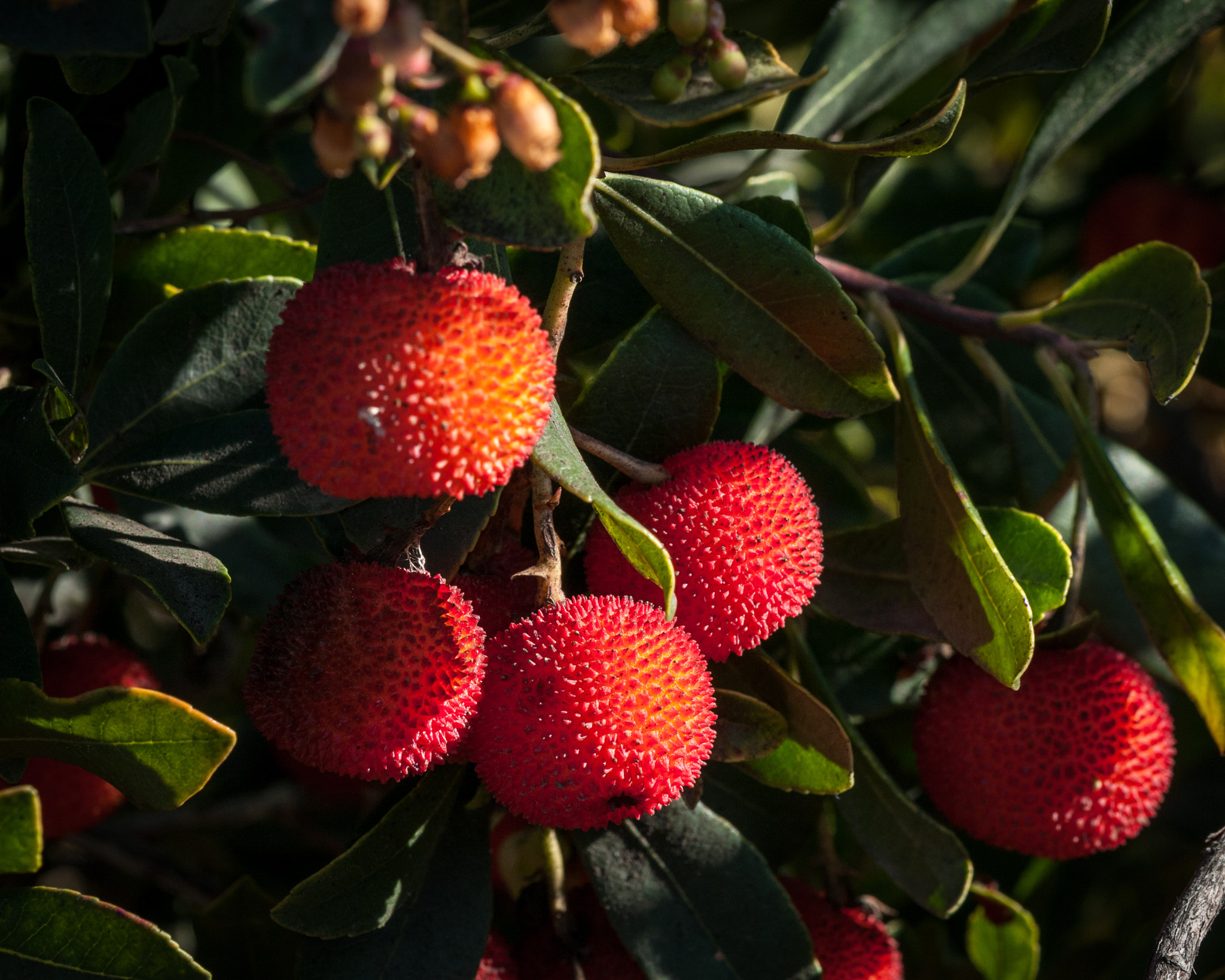
Strawberry trees (above) may have been a plentiful and thus important food source in St. Stefan.

Dryopithecus likely predominantly ate fruit (frugivory), and evidence of cavities on the teeth of the Austrian Dryopithecus indicates a high-sugar diet, likely deriving from ripe fruits and honey. Dental wearing indicates Dryopithecus ate both soft and hard food, which could either indicate they consumed a wide array of different foods, or they ate harder foods as a fallback. Nonetheless, its unspecialized teeth indicate it had a flexible diet, and large body size would have permitted a large gut to aid in the processing of less-digestible food, perhaps stretching to include foods such as leaves (folivory) in times of famine like in modern apes. Unlike modern apes, Dryopithecus likely had a high carbohydrate, low fibre diet.

A high-fructose diet is associated with elevated levels of uric acid, which is neutralized by uricase in most animals except great apes. It is thought they stopped producing it by 15 mya, resulting in increased blood pressure, which in turn led to increased activity, and a greater ability to build up fat reserves. The palaeoenvironment of late Miocene Austria indicates an abundance of fruiting trees and honey for nine or ten months out of the year, and Dryopithecus may have relied on these fat reserves during the late winter. High uric acid levels in the blood are also associated with increased intelligence.

Dryopithecus males had larger canines than females, which is associated with high levels of aggression in modern primates.

== Paleoecology ==
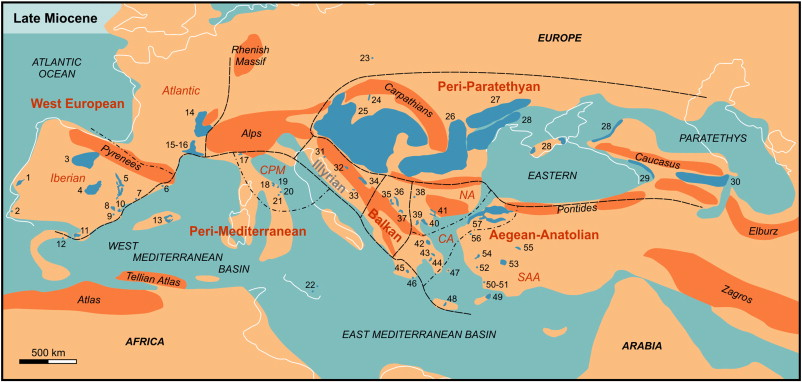
A map of late Miocene Europe

The remains of Dryopithecus are often associated with several large mammals, such as proboscideans (e. g., though not limited to, Gomphotherium), rhinoceroses (e. g., Lartetotherium), suids (e. g., Listriodon), bovids (e. g., Miotragocerus), equids (e. g., Anchitherium), hyaenids (e. g., Protictitherium), and felids (e. g., Pseudaelurus). Other associated primates are the great apes Hispanopithecus, Anoiapithecus, and Pierolapithecus; and the pliopithecid ape Pliopithecus. These fauna are consistent with a warm, forested, paratropical wetland environment, and it may have lived in a seasonal climate. For the Austrian Dryopithecus, plants such as Prunus, grapevines, black mulberry, strawberry trees, hickory, and chestnuts may have been important fruit sources; and the latter two, oak, beech, elm, and pine honey sources.

The late Miocene was the beginning of a drying trend in Europe. Increasing seasonality and dry spells in the Mediterranean region and the emergence of a Mediterranean climate likely caused the replacement of forestland and woodland by open shrubland; and the uplift of the Alps caused tropical and warm-climate vegetation in Central Europe to retreat in favor of mid-latitude and alpine flora. This likely led to the extinction of great apes in Europe.

== See also ==
- Timeline of human evolution
- Anoiapithecus
- Chororapithecus
- Hispanopithecus
- Nakalipithecus
- Oreopithecus
- Pierolapithecus
- Samburupithecus
- Rangwapithecus
- Danuvius
