= Rudabánya =

- Town
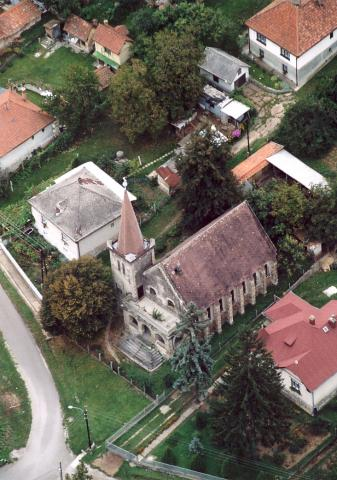
- Aerial view

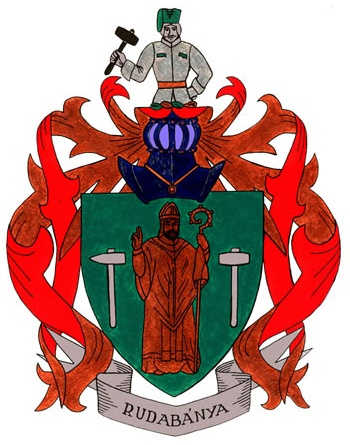
- Coat of arms

- Location of Borsod-Abaúj-Zemplén county in Hungary

- Location of Rudabánya
- Coordinates: 48.37504°N 20.62085°E
- Country: Hungary
- County: Borsod-Abaúj-Zemplén
- District: Kazincbarcika

Area
  - Total: 16.46 km^{2} (6.36 sq mi)

Population (2008)
  - Total: 2,721
  - Density: 165.3/km^{2} (428/sq mi)
- Time zone: UTC+1 (CET)
  - Summer (DST): UTC+2 (CEST)
- Postal code: 3733
- Area code: (+36) 48
- Website: www.rudabanya.hu

Rudabánya is a town in Borsod-Abaúj-Zemplén county, Hungary.

The town territory was the location of the discovery of a hominid from 12 million years ago, Rudapithecus hungaricus (1969).

== International relations ==
Rudabánya is twinned with:

- Dobšiná, Slovakia (2011)
- Borsec, Romania (2012)
