= Crouzeliinae =

Crouzeliinae Temporal range: Early Miocene–Late Miocene

Scientific classification
- Domain: Eukaryota
- Kingdom: Animalia
- Phylum: Chordata
- Class: Mammalia
- Order: Primates
- Suborder: Haplorhini
- Infraorder: Simiiformes
- Family: †Pliopithecidae
- Subfamily: †Crouzeliinae

Genera
- Plesiopliopithecus; Anapithecus; Laccopithecus; Egarapithecus; Barberapithecus; Pliobates

Extinct subfamily of primates

Crouzeliinae is an extinct subfamily of Pliopithecidae primates that inhabited Europe and China during the Miocene, approximately 8–14.5 million years ago - they appear to have originated in Asia and extended their range into Europe between 17 and 13 million years ago. Crouzeliines can be distinguished from the other Pliopithecoidea subfamilies on the basis of uniquely derived dental traits.

== Dental morphology ==
As with nearly all Pliopithecoid taxa, Crouzliines are distinguished from the other Pliopithecoidea subfamilies, Dionysopithecinae and Pliopithecinae, on the basis of dental morphology.

"Crouzeliines in general differ from plioplithecids (Dionysopithecinae and Pliopithecinae) in having sharper, more bilaterally compressed cusps more displaced between the margins of the crowns, resulting in larger, relatively deep occlusal basins (except the distal basin, which is restricted and lingually offset) ... Crouzeliines also differ in having elongated molars and premolars with sharp, well-developed crests, particularly between the trigonids and talonids and along the crown margins."

— David Begun, The Pliopithecoidea

== Classification ==
The Crouzeliinae subfamily is defined on the basis of the type genus, Crouzelia. Some authors have synonymized this genus with Plesiopliopithecus, whereas others retain the distinction. Regardless, the suprageneric taxon has remained, and has been further divided into two distinct tribes: Crouzeliini and Anapithecinii. Crouzeliini is made up of four morphologically similar species, all of which are placed into the same genus (Plesiopliopithecus auscitanensis, Plesiopliopithecus rhondanica, Plesiopliopithecus lockeri, and Plesiopliopithecus priensis). In contrast, Anapithecini contains four species, each of which is a unique genus (Anapithecus hernyaki, Laccopithecus robustus, Egarapithecus narcisoi, and Barberapithecus huerzeleri).
