= Yuanmoupithecus =

Yuanmoupithecus Temporal range: Late Miocene, 8.2–7.1 Ma

Scientific classification
- Kingdom: Animalia
- Phylum: Chordata
- Class: Mammalia
- Infraclass: Placentalia
- Order: Primates
- Superfamily: Hominoidea
- Family: Hylobatidae
- Genus: †Yuanmoupithecus; Pan, 2006
- Species: †Y. xiaoyuan

Binomial name
- †Yuanmoupithecus xiaoyuan Pan, 2006

Extinct species of primate

Yuanmoupithecus is an extinct genus of gibbons that lived 8.2 to 7.1 million years ago during the late Miocene. As of 2022, it is the oldest gibbon known. The fossils, mainly of teeth, were discovered from Yuanmou, Yunnan Province, China. The type species is Y. xiaoyuan, described by Yuerong Pan in 2006.

== Discovery ==
Yuanmoupithecus fossils were discovered from the Late Miocene Xiaohe Formation in the Yuanmou Basin, Yunnan Province in southwest China. The first specimens were the first right molar and the second left molar found during an excavation between 1986 and 1990 at Fangbeiliangzi, a low hill near Xiaohe village, by a joint expedition of the Yunnan Provincial Museum, Chuxiong Prefectural Museum and the Yuanmou Man Museum. Five more teeth fragments were recovered in 1999 from Leilao village. In 2006, Yuerong Pan at the Institute of Vertebrate Paleontology and Paleoanthropology, Chinese Academy of Sciences, gave the formal description and the scientific name. Several additional teeth were collected from the surrounding areas between 2006 and 2022, including the lower face of a juvenile individual and a second left molar, which became the holotype specimen. Most of the teeth were worn and incomplete and the identity of the primate could not be resolved. However, two complete teeth collected at Leilao in 2006 gave a clear picture of the fossils. Presenting the analysis of the two teeth at the American Association of Physical Anthropologists, Terry Harrison of New York University confirmed that the specimens are closely related to modern gibbons, remarking the species as "an early gibbon ancestor" in 2008. The species became one of the well-established Miocene primates, as Bruce Grant, colleague of Harrison, explained:

Perhaps the most exciting finding (reported in this years AAPA meetings [in 2008]) was the discovery that Yuanmoupithecus represents the earliest known fossil gibbon. I have been hunting for ancestral gibbons all of my professional life, debunking most of the purported candidates, so I'm especially excited about these discoveries.

After additional collections of seven complete teeth and an upper jaw, detailed description and evolutionary implications were published in the Journal of Human Evolution in 2022.

== Description and importance ==
The gibbon family separated from the apes around 17 to 22 million years ago. Miocene primates between 14 and 21 million years old have been known from Africa, so that gibbons are presumed to originate in Africa. However, there is a large gap of fossil record around 10 million years old that would link the gibbon family tree from those of African species to other parts of the world. The oldest gibbon fossils are about 2 million years old that are found in Asia. At around 8.2 to 7.1 million years old, Yuanmoupithecus fits well the large gap of the missing fossil lines, and is considered to be an important intermediate species between monkeys and great apes.

According to estimates, Yuanmoupithecus is about the size of modern gibbons, weighing around 16 kg.
