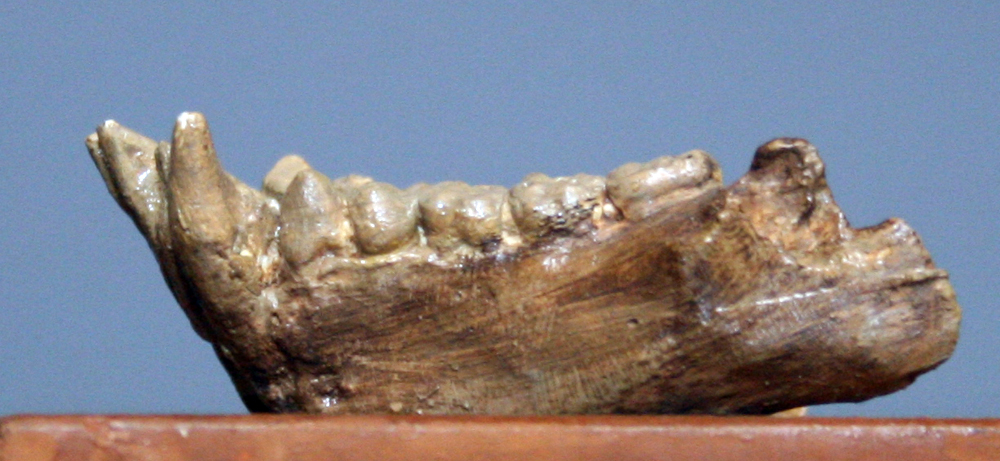
- Mandible fragment of Pliopithecus antiquus from Sansan, France; cast from Museum national d'histoire naturelle, Paris

Scientific classification
- Kingdom: Animalia
- Phylum: Chordata
- Class: Mammalia
- Order: Primates
- Family: †Pliopithecidae
- Subfamily: †Pliopithecinae
- Genus: †Pliopithecus; Gervais, 1849

Paleospecies
- †Pliopithecus antiquus; †Pliopithecus bii; †Pliopithecus canmatensis; †Pliopithecus piveteaui; †Pliopithecus platyodon; †Pliopithecus vindobonensis; †Pliopithecus zhanxiangi

= Pliopithecus =

Pliopithecus Temporal range: Miocene,

Extinct genus of primates

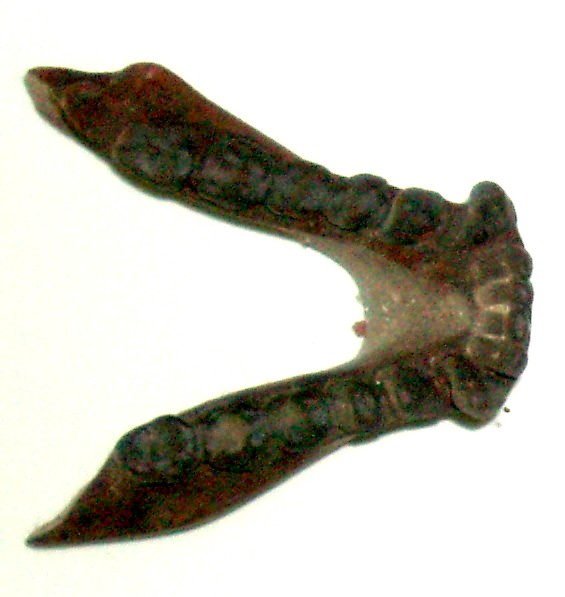
Pliopithecus antiquus jaw seen from above

Pliopithecus (meaning "more ape") is a genus of extinct primates of the Miocene. It was discovered in 1837 by Édouard Lartet (1801–1871) in France, with fossils subsequently discovered in Switzerland, Slovakia and Spain.

Pliopithecus had a similar size and form to modern gibbons, to which it may be related, although it is probably not a direct ancestor. It had long limbs, hands, and feet, and may have been able to brachiate, swinging between trees using its arms. Unlike gibbons, it had a short tail, and only partial stereoscopic vision.

They appear to have originated in Asia and extended their range into Europe between 20 and 17 million years ago.

Begun and Harrison list the following species within the genus:

- Pliopithecus antiquus
- Pliopithecus bii
- Pliopithecus canmatensis
- Pliopithecus platyodon
- Pliopithecus vindobonensis
- Pliopithecus zhanxiangi

Pliopithecus antiquus has been referred to previously as P. piveteaui. P. vindobonensis is sometimes considered to be a separate genus, Epipliopithecus. Anapithecus is a close relative and was initially considered a subgenus of Pliopithecus. Another close relative is Krishnapithecus krishnaii, which was originally identified as Pliopithecus krishnaii.
