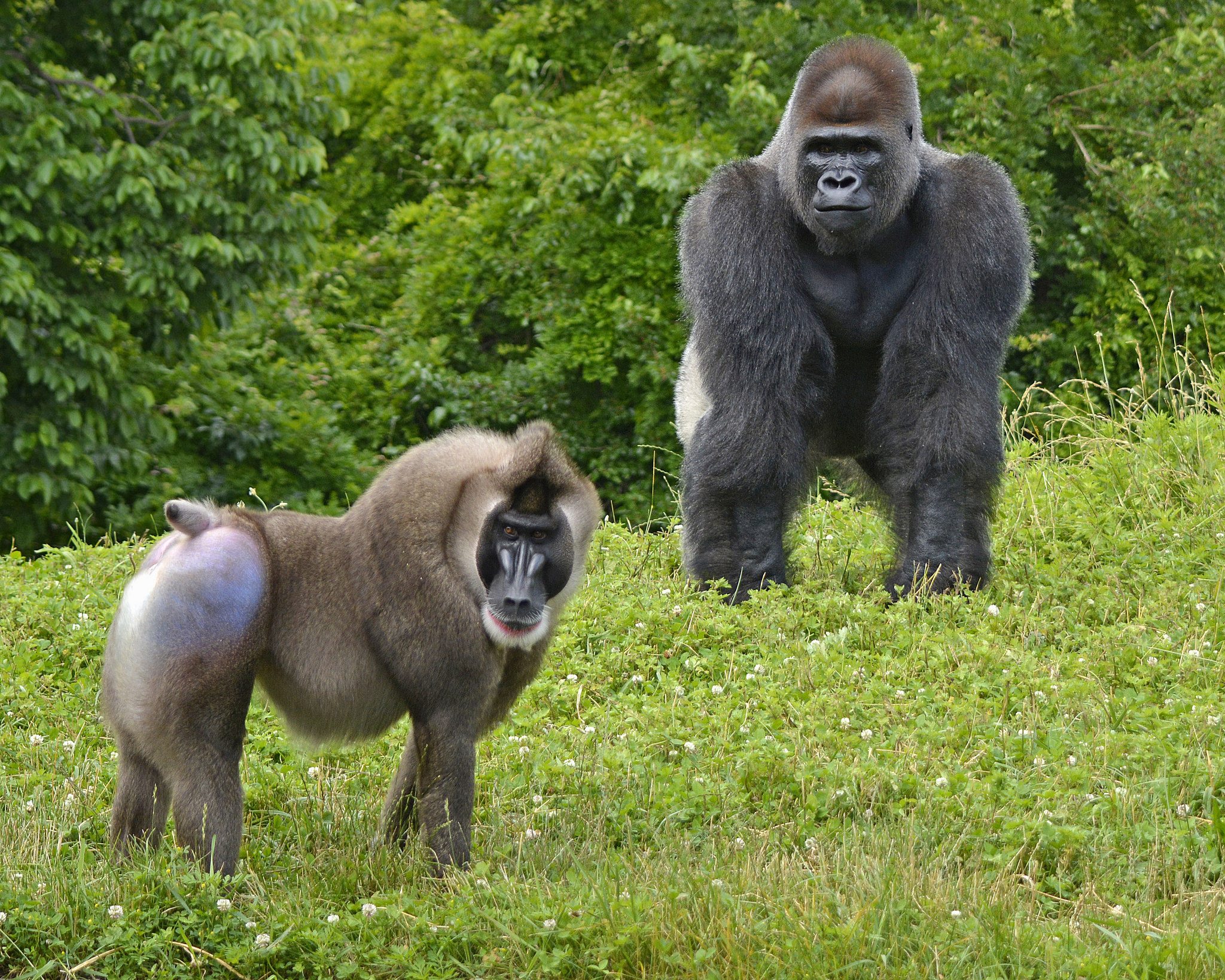
- Drill and Western gorilla, two species of Catarrhini.

Scientific classification
- Kingdom: Animalia
- Phylum: Chordata
- Class: Mammalia
- Infraclass: Placentalia
- Order: Primates
- Infraorder: Simiiformes
- Parvorder: Catarrhini; É. Geoffroy, 1812

Superfamilies
- †Oligopithecidae; †Saadanioidea; †Propliopithecoidea; †Dendropithecoidea; †Pliopithecoidea; Cercopithecoidea (Old World monkeys); Hominoidea (apes)

Synonyms
- Catarrhine monkeys; Old World anthropoids; Old World monkeys (from a cladistic definition that includes apes, and thus humans); Simiadae, W.C.L. Martin, 1841

= Catarrhini =

Catarrhines Temporal range: Late Eocene–Holocene

Group of Old World monkeys and apes

The parvorder Catarrhini /kætəˈraɪnaɪ/ (known commonly as catarrhine monkeys, Old World anthropoids, or Old World monkeys) consists of the Cercopithecoidea (Old World monkeys) and Hominoidea (apes). In 1812, Geoffroy grouped those two groups together and established the name Catarrhini, "Old World monkeys" (singes de l'Ancien Monde in French). Its sister in the infraorder Simiiformes (simians) is the parvorder Platyrrhini (New World monkeys). There has been some resistance to directly designate apes (and thus humans) as monkeys despite the scientific evidence, so "Old World monkey" may be taken to mean the Cercopithecoidea or the Catarrhini. That apes are monkeys was already realized by Georges-Louis Leclerc, Comte de Buffon in the 18th century. Linnaeus placed this group in 1758, together with what we now recognise as the tarsiers and the New World monkeys, in a single genus "Simia" (sans Homo). The Catarrhini are all native to Africa and Asia. Members of this parvorder are called catarrhines.

The Catarrhini are the sister group to the New World monkeys, the Platyrrhini. Some six million years before the ape-Cercopithecoidea bifurcation, the Platyrrhini emerged within "monkeys" by migration to South America from Afro-Arabia (the Old World), likely by ocean.

== Description ==
The technical distinction between the New World platyrrhines and Old World catarrhines is the shape of their noses. The platyrrhines (from Ancient Greek platy-, "flat", and rhin-, "nose") have nostrils which face sideways. The catarrhines (from Ancient Greek katà-, "down", and rhin-, "nose") have nostrils that face downwards. Catarrhines also never have prehensile tails, and have flat fingernails and toenails, a tubular ectotympanic (ear bone), and eight, not 12, premolars, giving them a dental formula of 2.1.2.32.1.2.3, indicating 2 incisors, 1 canine, 2 premolars, and 3 molars on each side of the upper and lower jaws.

Most catarrhine species show considerable sexual dimorphism and do not form a pair bond. Most, but not all, species live in social groups. Like the platyrrhines, the catarrhines are generally diurnal, and have grasping hands and (with the exception of bipedal humans) grasping feet.

The apes—in both traditional and phylogenic nomenclature—are exclusively catarrhine species. In traditional usage, ape describes any tailless, larger, and more typically ground-dwelling species of catarrhine. "Ape" may be found as part of the common name of such species of monkeys, such as the Barbary ape and Black ape. In phylogenic usage, the term ape applies only to the superfamily Hominoidea. This grouping comprises two families: Hylobatidae, the lesser apes (gibbons); and Hominidae, the great apes, including orangutans, gorillas, chimpanzees, humans, and related extinct genera, such as the prehuman australopithecines and the giant orangutan relative Gigantopithecus.

== Classification and evolution ==
According to Schrago & Russo, New World monkeys split from their Old World kin about 35 million years ago (Mya). They use the major catarrhine division between cercopithecoids and hominoids of about 25 Mya (which they argue is strongly supported by the fossil evidence), as a calibration point, and from this also calculate the gibbons separating from the great apes (including humans) about 15-19 Mya.

According to Begun and Harrison, the Catarrhini split from their New World monkey kin about 44 - 40 Mya, with the first catarrhines appearing in Africa and Arabia, and not appearing in Eurasia (outside Arabia) until 18-17 Mya.

Catarrhini lost the enzyme Alpha-galactosidase, present in all other mammal lineages, sometime after the split from platyrrhini. It is hypothesized that an ancient pathogen containing Alpha-galactosidase may be responsible, as only individuals with mutations that "turned off" the gene for Alpha-galactosidase would have produced antibodies against the pathogen and survived.

The distinction between apes and monkeys is complicated by the traditional paraphyly of monkeys: apes emerged as a sister group of Old World monkeys in the catarrhines, which are a sister group of New World monkeys. Therefore, cladistically, apes, catarrhines and related contemporary extinct groups such as Parapithecidae are monkeys as well, for any consistent definition of "monkey". "Old World Monkey" may also legitimately be taken to be meant to include all the catarrhines, including apes and extinct species such as Aegyptopithecus, in which case the apes, Cercopithecoidea and Aegyptopithecus emerged within the Old World Monkeys. Although the colloquial usage of terms like ape and monkey in English reflects a misconception about their true biological relationship, this is not the case in some other languages; for example, in Russian, the same term is used to describe all simians, both with and without tails, including apes.

- Order Primates
  - Suborder Strepsirrhini: lemurs, lorises, etc.
  - Suborder Haplorhini: tarsiers + monkeys, including apes
    - Infraorder Tarsiiformes
      - Family Tarsiidae: tarsiers
    - Infraorder Simiiformes: simians (monkeys, including apes), or higher primates
      - Parvorder Catarrhini
        - Superfamily †Propliopithecoidea
          - Family †Propliopithecidae (includes Aegyptopithecus)
        - Superfamily †Pliopithecoidea
          - Family †Dionysopithecidae
          - Family †Pliopithecidae
        - Superfamily †Dendropithecoidea
          - Family †Dendropithecidae
        - Superfamily †Saadanioidea
          - Family †Saadaniidae
        - Superfamily Cercopithecoidea
          - Family Cercopithecidae
        - Superfamily Hominoidea: apes
          - Family Hylobatidae: gibbons
          - Family Hominidae: great apes (including humans)
      - Parvorder Platyrrhini: New World monkeys

=== Cladogram ===
Below is a cladogram with extinct species in which the crown Catharrhini, which emerged in the Propliopithecoidea. Also, Saadanioidea is sister of the Cercopithecoidea rather than of the Crown Catarrhini here. It is indicated how many million years ago (Mya) the clades diverged into newer clades.

- Crown Simians (37)
  - Platyrrhini
  - Catarrhini (35)
    - Oligopithecidae (†34 Mya)
    - Propliopithecoidea (35)
      - Taqah Propliopithecid (†31)
      - (33)
        - Propliopithecoidea s.s. (†31)
          - Propliopithecus (†30)
          - Aegyptopithecus (†30)
        - (33)
          - Kamoyapithecus (†25)
          - Pliopithecoidea (†6)
          - - Micropithecus (†17)
            - Crown Catharrhini (31)
              - Hominoidea
              - (29)
                - Saadanioidea (†28)
                - Cercopithecoidea (24)
                  - Victoriapithecinae (†19)
                  - Crown Cercopithecoidea

The Platyrrhini may have emerged in e.g. the Oligopithecidae. The Saadanioidea may be sister to the Propliopithecoidea s.s., and Micropithecus may be sister to the Taqah Propliopithecids.
