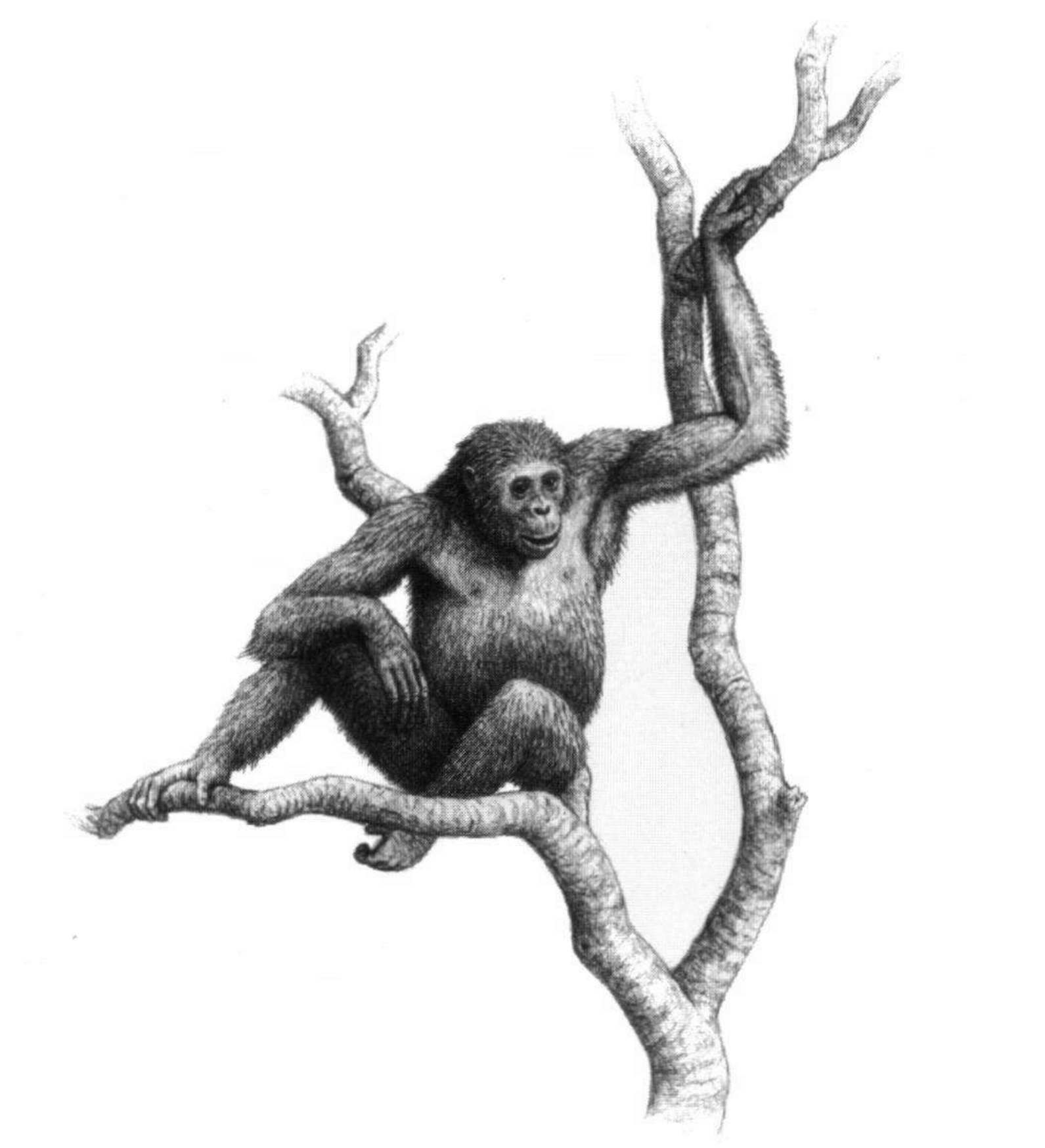
- Reconstruction of H. laietanus by Mauricio Antón

Scientific classification
- Kingdom: Animalia
- Phylum: Chordata
- Class: Mammalia
- Infraclass: Placentalia
- Order: Primates
- Superfamily: Hominoidea
- Family: Hominidae
- Subfamily: Ponginae
- Tribe: †Hispanopithecini
- Genus: †Hispanopithecus (Villalta & Crusafont, 1944)

Species
- †Hispanopithecus laietanus; †Hispanopithecus crusafonti

Synonyms
- Dryopithecus (Villalta & Crusafont, 1944)

= Hispanopithecus =

Hispanopithecus Temporal range: Miocene, 11.1–9.5 Ma

Genus of apes from Miocene Europe

Hispanopithecus is a genus of apes that inhabited Europe during the Miocene epoch. It was first identified in a 1944 paper by J. F. Villalta and M. Crusafont in Notas y Comunicaciones del Instituto Geologico y Minero de España. Anthropologists disagree as to whether Hispanopithecus belongs to the subfamily Ponginae (most closely related to modern orangutans) or Homininae (most closely related to gorillas, chimpanzees, and humans).

The genus contains two known species: Hispanopithecus laietanus and Hispanopithecus crusafonti. The fossils have been dated to between 11.1 and 9.5 million years ago.

== Morphology ==
Postcranial features exhibit morphological features that suggest a mosaic of locomotive behaviors. The structure of the cortical bone at the proximal and distal ends of the femur, particularly the neck of the femoral head, indicate an orthograde body plan. Recovered vertebrae indicate a relatively short, wide, and deep thorax support the orthograde posture for climbing, clambering, and feeding in an arboreal environment. The longer forelimbs and dorsally situated scapulae provide a broad range of motion which would enable suspensory below-branch behavior and proficiency in reaching food during foraging.

The humeral-ulnar joint allowed for hyperextension and flexion of the forearm. The robust carpals and metacarpals with dorsally extended articular surfaces provide strong indication of palmigrade quadrupedalism in above-branch locomotion. The proximal phalanges are strongly curved and relatively long when compared to other great apes and most closely resembling the structure of extant orangutans. The length and curvature of the manual phalanges indicates the 'double-locking' mechanism similar to orangutans and enable a powerful grip around slender branches.

The body mass estimates of recovered specimens provides strong evidence of sexual dimorphism. The males have been estimated to weigh approximately 40 kilograms (88 lb) and possess prominent canine teeth. The females have been estimated to weigh approximately 22–25 kilograms (49–55 lb) and possess reduced canine teeth. The dental formula of Hispanopithecus, common to great apes, is 2.1.2.32.1.2.3 with the Y5 occlusal surface present on the lower molars.

The second-to-fourth digit ratio of H. laietanus was relatively low and likely indicates that the species was polygynous, as this trait corresponds to high prenatal androgen effects and is associated with polygyny.

== Diet and environment ==
Analysis of the microwear of the teeth of Hispanopithecus indicate a morphological preference for softer foods, including fruits and possibly young leaves. A combination of surface scratches and pitting are indicative of a mixed diet, lacking many hard foods like nuts and seeds except in times of soft food scarcity and lacking wear patterns common with heavy folivore diets. Linear hypoplasia is common, which would suggest episodes of malnutrition stress during dental development, indicating the need for fall-back foods in the diet when preferred foods are unavailable.

Evidence suggests that the environment of Hispanopithecus on the Iberian Peninsula was tropical to subtropical with marsh-like features. Flora of the period is preserved as samples of evergreen laurels, palms, reeds, and marsh herbs in wet areas and diverse leguminous trees and shrubs in lowland dry areas. Figs have been preserved in the stratographic layer which also contained hominid teeth, which would have been available year-round in the Middle Miocene. The climate changed in the Late Miocene to a cooler, dryer, less tropical environment. This would have brought seasonal change which would have impacted the available food sources of Hispanopithecus, possibly contributing to extinction near this time.

== See also ==
- Dryopithecus – Extinct great ape from Europe
