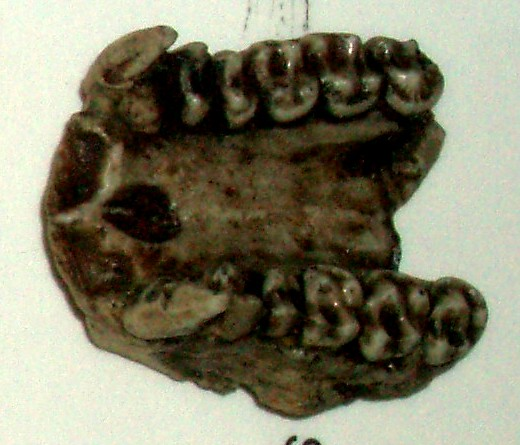
- Dendropithecus macinnesi fossil

Scientific classification
- Kingdom: Animalia
- Phylum: Chordata
- Class: Mammalia
- Order: Primates
- Infraorder: Simiiformes
- Parvorder: Catarrhini
- Superfamily: †Pliopithecoidea
- Family: †Pliopithecidae

Subfamilies
- Crouzeliinae; Pliopithecinae; Dionysopithecinae

= Pliopithecidae =

Pliopithecidae Temporal range: Early Miocene–Pliocene

Extinct family of primates

The family Pliopithecidae is an extinct family of fossil catarrhines and members of the Pliopithecoidea superfamily.

Their anatomy combined primitive features such as a small braincase, a long snout, and a tail. At the same time, they possessed more advanced features such as stereoscopic vision and ape-like teeth and jaws, clearly distinguishing them from monkeys.

Begun and Harrison divide the Pliopithecidae into subfamilies Pliopithecinae and Crouzeliinae. Dionysopithecinae are sometimes placed here as a subfamily, but Begun & Harrison place them in their own family, the Dionysopithecidae.

== Palaeoecology ==
Pliopithecids had a clear habitat preference for warm and humid habitats.
