= Hammerschmiede clay pit =

Quarry in Pforzen, Germany

Hammerschmiede Clay Pit
- Stratigraphic range: Tortonian 11.66-11.42 Ma
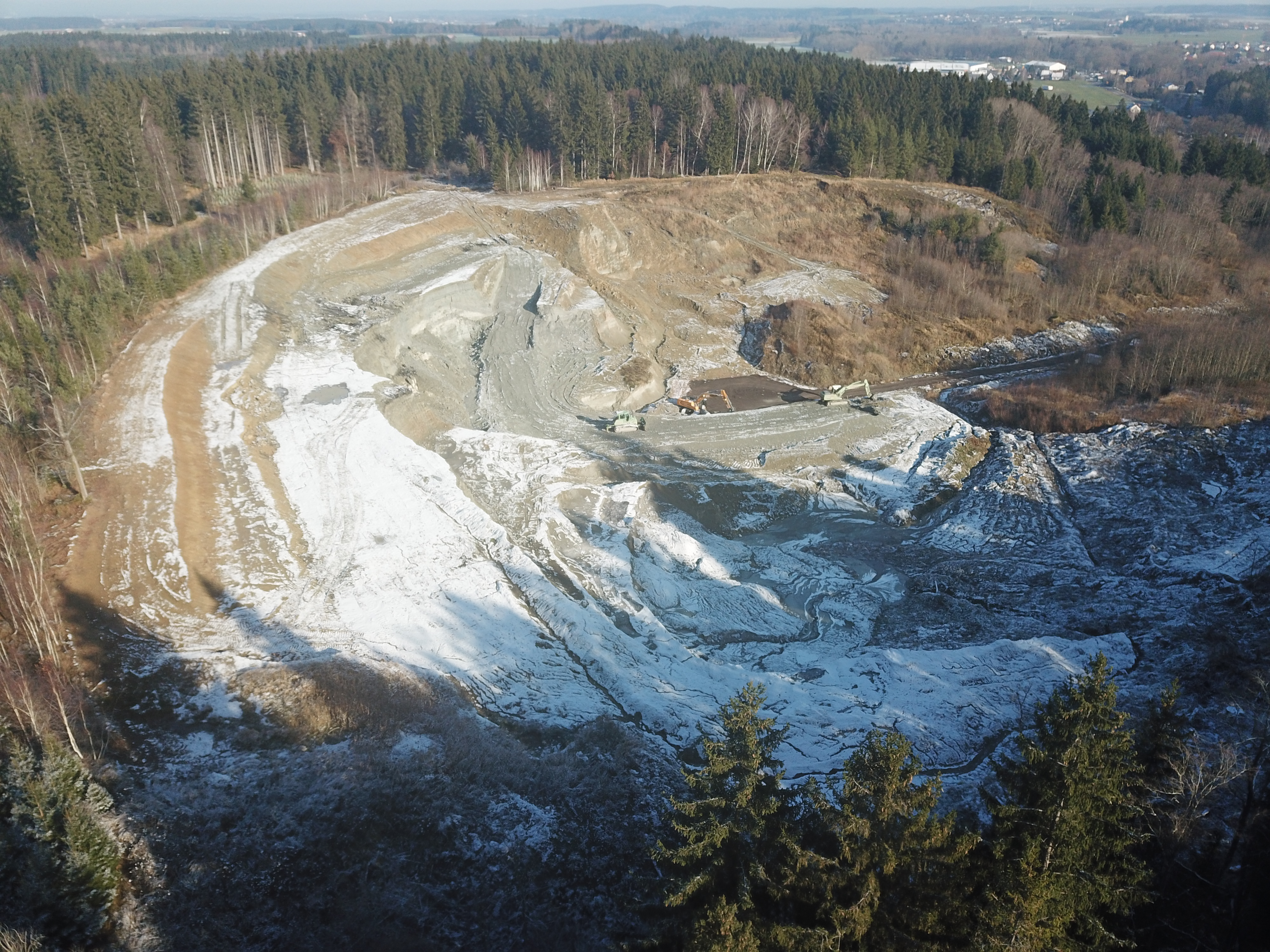
- Image of the clay pit
- Type: Fossil site
- Unit of: Upper Freshwater Molasse
- Thickness: 25.7 m

Lithology
- Primary: Silts, sandstone and claystone

Location
- Coordinates: 47°55′38″N 10°35′28″E
- Region: Bavaria
- Country: Germany
- Hammerschmiede clay pit (Germany) Hammerschmiede clay pit (Bavaria)

The Hammerschmiede clay pit (German: Tongrube Hammerschmiede) is a fossil bearing locality in Pforzen, Bavaria, Germany most well known for the discovery of Danuvius guggenmosi, the potentially earliest known bipedal ape. With an age of 11.66-11.42 Ma the site dates to the transition between the Middle and Late Miocene epoch, providing an important window into the faunal changes taking place during this time. This correlates to the time just after the Serravallian-Tortonian boundary, and the MN zones 7/8. It is one of the most well-known Miocene sites, with over 15,000 individual fossils and 117 species having been discovered as of 2020. It has been called "the most important German paleontological discovery of the last decades".

== History ==
Hammerschmiede's first fossils were first discovered by the hobby archaeologist Siegulf Guggenmos in 1965. The site became known in academic circles following publications on its rich fauna of micromammals in 1975. Since 2011, the excavations are led by a collaboration between the University of Tübingen and the Senckenberg Museum, and led by Madelaine Böhme, with the help of local volunteers. Excavations were intensified in 2015, following the discovery of a variety of scientifically significant finds. Media attention increased following the description of Danuvius guggenmosi in 2019, its name honoring the discoverer of the site. Nicknamed "Udo", the discovery was described as the oldest known example of an upright ape in Hominidae, with some media even going so far as to call it proof that the cradle of humanity was located in Bavaria. The site is threatened by clay mining.

== Geography ==
The Hammerschmiede clay pit is located within the eastern Allgäu region of Bavaria, within the municipality of Pforzen, at a height above sea level of almost 700 m. It is located just west of the district Hammerschmiede, after which it is named, and lies between the stream Riedgraben to its south, and the river Wertach to its East. Furthermore, the locality Irsee, where fossil plant remains had already been discovered in the 1950s, is located 4.3 km to its southwest. The closest town is Kaufbeuren to its south-east.

== Geology and Stratigraphy ==
The Hammerschmiede locality is part of the Upper Freshwater Molasse within the North Alpine foreland Basin. It is part of the Obere Serie, which includes Germany's youngest Molasse sediments. The 25.7 m thick section is best exposed at the southern end of the clay pit.

The horizontally bedded layers are mostly grey-colored, carbonatic and fine-grained silts, fine sands and claystone. The sedimentary succession can be traced over 150 m in a northern direction, with seven marker beds being traceable across the whole distance. These are three lignite horizons, three sand horizons and one marlstone. The circa 0.45 m thick homogeneous silty-clayey marlstone contains a variety of terrestrial gastropods, and is located in the basal part of the northern profile. Meanwhile, up to 10 mm thick pedogenic carbonate concretions are abundant in the upper 20 cm. A 20 cm thick blackish lignite horizon occurs 1.5 m above this horizon, overlaying 70 cm of yellowish and brownish mottled dark-grey clay. The color of this lignite is platy, it is partly xylitic and can be horizontally replaced by carbonatic peat clay. This succession may be viewed as a complete calcic paleosol, with the marlstone representing the Bk-horizon, the mottled clay the Bt-horizon, and the lignite the A-horizon. Three horizontally continuous bodies of fine-sand are located between the upper and lower lignite horizons, with the lower one being 1.05 m thick, greenish-grey, showing no bedding structures, but containing iron-hydroxide stains. The middle sand horizon, made up of mica rich grey-blue to greyish sand and containing iron-hydroxide stains, is 2.8 m thick at the southern part of the clay pit, and develops into an up to 4 m deep channel at its erosional base in the North. The upper sand horizon, consisting of grey silty fine-sand showing iron-hydroxide stains, is 1.4 m thick and is divided by a 20 cm thick pedogenic bed 0.70 m above its base. This bed, which includes small fossilised roots, consists of mottled clayey and sandy silts. Reworked pedogenic carbonates clay pebbles with a diameter of up to 3 cm occur 30 cm above the base of the horizon.

A 35 cm thick lignite horizon marks the top of the presently exposed sedimentary succession in the Hammerschmiede outcrop. Its basal 25 cm are platy colored and rarely contain xylit, while the upper 10 cm are blackish carbonatic organic clay instead of lignite. It overlays about 10 cm of carbonate-free, grey-greenish and rusty-yellowish mottled sandy and clayey slits. As a 40 cm thick rooted silt horizon, containing abundant powdery, whitish soft carbonate occurs below it, the topmost succession can be interpreted as an immature calcic paleosol.

Directly below this, another, shallower calcic paleosol is developed. Its A-horizon is formed by 7 cm thick blackish carbonatic peat clay, overlaying the Bt-horizon (5 cm thick grey clay) and Bk-horizon (8 cm thick whitish clay horizon with abundant powdery carbonate). The paleosols rooting system reaches 50 cm below the A-horizon.

Furthermore, several truncated paleosols, which either completely or partly lack the A-horizon, occur especially between the two lower sand horizons. Those are characterized by up to 0.60 m thick grey green-yellowish mottled clayey marls, which contain matrix-supported pedogenic carbonate concretions. Two less developed calcic-paleosols, which are completely lacking A-horizons but clay-rich Btk horizons, make up the basal 4 meters of the succession in the southern profile.

The locality is divided into six stratigraphic layers.

- HAM 1, of an unclear age, but likely correlating with HAM 5.
- HAM 2, of an unclear age.
- HAM 3, is an erosional channel rich in lignitic pebbles near the top of the sequence, of an unclear age, although proposed to be younger than HAM 1.
- HAM 4 is made up of the trough cross stratified sands of the middle sand horizons channel, and has been dated to 11.44 Ma. Well-developed small-scale cross bedding structures and trough cross stratification can be found in the deepest parts, while reworked pedogenic carbonate concretions, pieces of wood and fossils of gastropods and vertebrates are found as channel lag. Its upper part shows well-preserved fossil roots, which can be traced to depths of 2.8 m. The individual meandering bends represent deposit periods of one to two centuries, a precision rare for terrestrial fossil sites.
- HAM 5 is the layer providing the most vertebrate fossils, and has been dated to 11.622–11.618 Ma. Its base is located at 681 m above sea level, and made up of 0.3 m grey, sandy marl containing the bivale Margaritifera flabellata and very abundant component-supported pedogenic carbonate concretion, with an average diameter of 10 mm. Above comes a 0.2 m layer of fine-to-medium grained sand, containing both bivalves and caliche pebbles. The following 0.15 m thick section is similar to the basal horizon, although the component-supported pedogenic carbonate concretion are much smaller on average, usually with a diameter of only 1 mm. A trough-shaped fine-to-medium grained sand body, containing well-rounded quartz pebbles with a diameter of up to 35 mm, as well as marble pebbles. Above 0.2 m of green-grey silty clay occurs. This layer contains remains of gastropods and bivalves, flaser bedded finesand laminae, a low number of pedogenic carbonate concretions and very few quartz pebbles. One meter of thick greenish sandy clay to silkish fine sand overlay the 0.85 m thick sand layer. Molluscs are common here, although badly preserved because of partial leaching of their carbonate shells.
- HAM 6, which has been entirely mined down, but based on available information it is likely that it had a lens-like structure, was dominated by proboscidean remains and situated slightly above HAM 4, just below the topmost coal layer. Therefore, its age has been calculated at 11.42 Ma.
- HAM 7 underlies the clays of HAM 1, and is made out a 10 cm thick organic-rich dark-brown layer, full of fossils of aquatic and amphibious animals, and a layer of clay, in which the remains of terrestrial animals, such as tortoises and rhinos, have been discovered.

== Paleoenvironment ==
The environment of Hammerschmiede was a seasonally dry floodplain of meandering rivers and streams flowing from south to north. HAM 5 represents a rivulet of local origin, with a width of four to five meters, a channel fill thickness of 0.8–1 meter and a mean water depth of ≤ 0.8 m. HAM 4 was a medium-sized river, with a width of roughly 50 m, a channel fill thickness of 4–5 m and a mean water depth of ≤ 4 m. Both channels are asymmetric in cross-section, with a more deeply incised outer bank and a shallower slip-off slope. Based on grain sizes, the flow velocity of both channels has been estimated as low to very low. However, the presence of an autochthonous freshwater mollusc fauna made up out of Pisidium, Margaritifera, Sphaerium and Bithynia suggests well-oxygenated waters, with moderate flow. The presence of considerable amounts of water are furthermore supported by the abundance of fish and turtle fossils, as well as swamp plants. Pebbles of alpine origin are not present, but reworked marine plankton from the Upper Marine Molasse is. Therefore, the catchment area of these rivers did not include alpine areas. Instead, they likely had their source in the Faltenmolasse just a few kilometers south of Hammerschmiede.

The paleoclimate of the locality was subtropical and considerably warmer and drier than that of the region today,⁣ with annual average temperatures of perhaps over 20 °C. Estimates based on the herpetofauna suggest mean annual precipitation (MAP) of 974 ± 256 mm for HAM 1, 1008 ± 257 mm for HAM 2 and 1196 ± 263 mm for HAM 3, while a MAP of 858 ± 147 mm has been estimated for the calcic paleosol with an estimated age of 11.64 ma. Another study estimates mean warm month temperatures of 24.7-27.9 °C, warm month precipitation of 79–172 mm and an average Köppen Aridity Index of 25.4.

All this suggests a seasonally dry climate, with swamps developing in the riparian regions during wetter periods. The high temperatures and comparatively low precipitations suggest a significant seasonal water stress, which is furthermore supported by the abundant pedogenic carbonate concretions, indications of forest fires and an as of yet unpublished stable isotope analysis, which showcases the enriched δ13C values of a C3 vegetation under very strong water stress. The large number of scansorial species suggests that the site was forested. HAM 4 appears to have been rather sparsely forested, with frequent forest fires, whereas the environment of HAM 5 was wooded, with highly structured vegetation.

== Biostratigraphy and Paleoecology ==
Hammerschmiede dates to the latest stages of MN7/8, overlapping with the Astaracian-Vallesian boundary. Notable is the presence of Kretzoiarctos beatrix and Sinohippus sp., which link it with the slightly older locality Nombrevilla 2. Another taxon connecting Hammerschmiede to this Spanish locality is Galerix cf. exilis, thought to have gone extinct in Central Europe earlier in the Middle Miocene, which likely reemmigrated from the Iberian peninsula to Germany during this time. Species such as these suggest that Hammerschmiede, and contemporary sites, may represent the last European faunas with Middle Miocene character. In slightly younger deposits, for example those correlating to the Mytilopsis ornitopsis zone (11.5 to 11.4 Ma, Vienna Basin) many lineages of large middle Miocene mammals have already been replaced with new immigrants, such as Hipparionine horses which define the MN9 zone. However, more typical Late Miocene taxa such as the large bovid Miotragocerus and the cricetid Microtocricetus molassicus are also present. Indeed, the occurrence of this cricetid originally led researchers to the conclusion that Hammerschmiede should be dated to MN9. Furthermore, Hammerschmiede shows both the first and last occurrences of a number of taxa, such as Eomellivora and Laphyctis, respectively.

Several of the bird species discovered at the site have not been reported from other Miocene localities, and possess distinctive traits. This may be because Miocene avifaunas are understudied, or alternatively be a result of the specific paleoenvironment preserved at the clay pit. The avifauna of Hammerschmiede differs from that of the slightly earlier locality of Steinheim, formed in lacustrine deposits, by the presence of darters and cormorants, while grebes, sulids, and palaelodids are absent. Anseriforms and loons have been discovered at both localities, though they are much more common at Steinheim, matching their preference to lake and sea environments, as preserved at that site, over the rivers and streams present at the clay pit. Even so, five piscivorous bird species coexisted at Hammerschmiede, including a loon, two cormorants, a darter, and likely a bird of prey. These varied considerably in size, ranging from the small Microcarbo (0.7 kg) to the large Anhinga pannonica (3.3 kg), suggesting they had different prey preferences. The piscivorous assemblage also includes a giant salamander, a soft-shell turtle, a snapping turtle, and five different mammals, which fed on over a dozen different species of fish, ranging from small loaches to 1.3 m long salmons.

The carnivoran assemblage of Hammerschmiede is the third richest known from Miocene Europe, with 28 different species. 13 sympatric small carnivorans are known from HAM 5 alone, a diversity comparable with the African tropics. The comparison with six other fossil assemblages (Sansan, Steinheim, La Grive-Saint Alban, Rudabánya, Can Ponsic and Can Llobateres 1) shows some marked differences between the carnivoran guild of those sites and Hammerschmiede. Amphicyonids, extremely common at the other localities, and barbourofelids, which are a regular presence, are only known from infrequent and fragmentary material at Hammerschmiede. Herpestids and lophocyonids, which are known from Sansan and La Grive, are completely absent, while Potamotherium and phocids are not known from the other localities. Mustelids are the most diverse family, with 11 species, making up 39% of all Carnivora present at the locality. Viverrids are only presented by 3 species (11%), but make up 21% of all individuals found. However, there is a marked difference between their abundance in HAM 4 (36%) and HAM 5 (4%). HAM 4 generally shows a lower diversity of large, scansorial and hypercarnivorous carnivorans in comparison with HAM 5, although the number of semiaquatic species is much higher with four. Notably, it is the only locality in which Lartetictis and Paralutra are known to have coexisted, despite the suggestion that the latter genus gradually replaced the former. Other likely competitors include Viverrictis-Circamustela and Semigenetta sansaniensis-"Martes" sansaniensis. Larger species with overlapping ecological roles include the metailurine and barbourofelid. The latters shows more derived sabertooth features, suggesting it likely preyed on larger animals than the felid, which probably attacked medium-sized prey from trees. The coexistence of all these competing taxa can be explained by the existence of significant resources. Niche partitioning is also seen among the proboscideans, with Tetralophodon being a mixed feeder, and Deinotherium a browser. As Gomphotherium is absent from this locality, it has been suggested that it correlates to the transition period from Middle Miocene faunas dominated by trilophodont gompothere taxa to the Late Miocene ones dominated by tetralophodont species.

== Paleofauna ==
Color key: Taxon / Reclassified taxon / Taxon falsely reported as present / Dubious taxon or junior synonym / Ichnotaxon / Ootaxon / Morphotaxon	Notes; Uncertain or tentative taxa are in small text; ~~crossed out~~ taxa are discredited.

=== Arthropoda ===
Name	Species	Layer	Material	Image
Dermestidae indet.				
Ephemeroptera indet.			Larvae	
cf. Microcarpolithes	cf. M. hexagonalis			
Potamon	P. sp.			The extant Potamon fluviatile

=== Molluscs ===
==== Bivalvia ====
Name	Species	Layer	Material	Notes	Image
Margaritifera/Pseudunio	M. flabellata	HAM 1–3 HAM 4 HAM 5		Unionid freshwater mussel, the most abundant bivalve of the Upper Freshwater Molasse, forming dense, monospecific communities in clean sand or gravel bottoms.	
Sphaerium	S. rivicola	HAM 4	fragmentary valves	First record from the Upper Freshwater Molasse. Inhabits muddy sand near riverbanks, with moderately strong currents, well-oxygenated water, but little submerged vegetation.	Sphaerium rivicola
Pisidium	P. amnicum	HAM 4	Two contiguous and a great number of individual valves	Inhabits sand in well-oxygenated waters, preferring strong currents and hard water	Pisidium amnicum

==== Gastropoda ====
Name	Species	Layer	Material	Notes	Image
Bithynia	B. sp. 1	HAM 4	Four shells of sub-adult individuals and a single operculum.	Generalist inhabiting limnic and fluval waters.	
Bithynia	B. sp. 2	HAM 4	Over 70 opercula	Generalist inhabiting limnic and fluval waters.	
Borysthenia	B. sp.	HAM 4	two almost complete shells	Earliest record of the genus. Inhabits sandy and muddy substrate near river banks.	
Carychium	C. sp.			A land snail belonging to the family Ellobiidae.	
Cepaea	C. sp.			A terrestrial snail belonging to the family Helicidae.	
Gyraulus	G. sp.			A freshwater ramshorn snail	
Limax	L. sp.			A limacid slug	
Planorbarius	P. sp.			A freshwater ramshorn snail	
Segmentina	S. sp.			A freshwater ramshorn snail	
Strobilops	S. sp.			A terrestrial snail.	
Tropidomphalus	T. sp.			An extinct genus of snails belonging to the family Elonidae	
Triptychia	T. sp.			Terrestrial snail belonging to the family Filholiidae	
Helicoidea indet.				Terrestrial snail, possibly belonging to the genus Pseudochloritis	

=== Fish ===
Name	Species	Layer	Material	Notes	Image
Esox	E. cf. lepidotus	HAM 1 HAM 3 HAM 5			Fossil of Esox lepidotus
Silurus	S. cf. joergi	HAM 1 HAM 3 HAM 5		Medium-sized catfish, the oldest member of the genus in Europe	Extant Silurus lithophilus
Cobitis	C. sp.	HAM 1 HAM 3 HAM 5			
Hucho	Hucho hucho			A large, predatory freshwater salmonid	Photo of Hucho hucho
Tinca	T. sp.	HAM 1 HAM 3 HAM 5			Extant tench (Tinca tinca)
Palaeoleuciscus	P. sp.	HAM 1 HAM 3 HAM 5			Paleoleuciscus oeningensis
Leuciscus	L. sp.	HAM 1 HAM 3 HAM 5			Common dace (Leuciscus leuciscus)
Barbus	B. sp.	HAM 5			Barbus plebejus
Luciobarbus	L. sp.				
Gobius	G. sp.	HAM 1 HAM 3 HAM 5			Gobius niger
Perca	P. sp.	HAM 1 HAM 3 HAM 5			European perch (Perca fluviatilis)
Sciaenidae indet.		HAM 5			

=== Amphibia ===
==== Anura ====
Name	Species	Layer	Material	Notes	Image
Eopelobates	E. sp.	HAM 3 HAM 5			Eopelobates
Palaeobatrachus	P. sp.	HAM 3 HAM 5			Life reconstruction of Palaeobatrachus gigas
Latonia	L. gigantea	HAM 1 HAM 3 HAM 5			
Pelophylax	P. sp.	HAM 1 HAM 3 HAM 5			
Hyla	H. sp.	HAM 1 HAM 5			
Bufotes	B. cf. viridis	HAM 3 HAM 5		Referred to as Bufo cf. viridis	Bufotes viridis

==== Urodela ====
Name	Species	Layer	Material	Notes	Image
Batrachosauroididae indet.		HAM 1 HAM 3 HAM 5		Occasionally spelled "Batrachosauroidae"	
aff. Palaeoproteus	aff. P. sp.	HAM 1 HAM 3		Batrachosauroidid salamander	
Scapherpetontidae indet.		HAM 3 HAM 5			
Andrias	A. scheuchzeri	HAM 4 HAM 5		Giant salamander	Andrias scheuchzeri
Mioproteus	M. aff. weizei	HAM 1 HAM 3 HAM 5		Fossil salamander related to the olm	Life reconstruction of Mioproteus wezei
Chelotriton	C. paradoxus	HAM 1 HAM 3 HAM 5		A newt	Chelotriton paradoxus
Triturus	T. roehrsi	HAM 1 HAM 3 HAM 5		A newt	
Triturus	T. aff. montadoni	HAM 3 HAM 5		A newt	

=== Reptiles ===
==== Choristodera ====
Name	Species	Layer	Material	Notes	Image
Lazarussuchus	L. sp.	HAM 2 HAM 3 HAM 5		The youngest fossils referred to this taxon	Life reconstruction of Lazarussuchus inexpectatus

==== Testudines ====
Name	Species	Layer	Material	Notes	Image
Trionyx	T. sp.	HAM 1-3 HAM 4 HAM 5 HAM 6	Plate fragments	A softshell turtle	
Chelydropsis	C. sp.	HAM 1-3 HAM 4 HAM 5 HAM 6	Over a thousand remains, including eggs and a well-preserved skull.	Most commonly found tetrapod at the locality. With a length of 70 cm the largest European turtle of its time. Likely molluscivorous chelydrid	
Titanochelon	T. sp.	HAM 5		A large tortoise	
Testudo	T. sp.	HAM 1 HAM 5		A tortoise	
Clemmydopsis	C. sp.	HAM 1 HAM 4 HAM 5	Carapace of a juvenile	A swamp turtle	
Mauremys	M. sarmatica	HAM 4 HAM 5 HAM 6		A swamp turtle	
Melanochelys	M. sp.	HAM 4			
Ptychogaster (Temnoclemmys)	P. (T.) batalleri	HAM 4			

==== Squamata ====
Name	Species	Layer	Material	Notes	Image
Lacerta	L. sp. 1	HAM 1 HAM 2 HAM 3 HAM 5			
Lacerta	L. sp. 2	HAM 1 HAM 5			
Pseudopus	P. pannonicus	HAM 1 HAM 2 HAM 3 HAM 5	A great number of scales.	Anguid, with a length of up to two meters the largest lizard present	Sheltopusik (Pseudopus apodus)
Ophisaurus	O. sp.	HAM 1 HAM 2 HAM 3 HAM 5		Anguid lizard	
Chalcides	C. sp.	HAM 1 HAM 5		A skink	
Scincidea indet.		HAM 2 HAM 3			
Amphisbaenidae indet.		HAM 1 HAM 5			
Colubrinae sp. 1		HAM 1 HAM 5			
Colubrinae sp. 2		HAM 1 HAM 5			
Natricinae sp. 1		HAM 1 HAM 5			
Natricinae sp. 2		HAM 5			
Erycinae indet.		HAM 5			

=== Aves ===
Name	Species	Layer	Material	Notes	Image
Accipitriformes indet.		HAM 5		Two species	
Mioaetus	M. pforzenensis	HAM 4	Part of a left tarsometatarsus	A possibly piscivorous bird of prey comparable to the ornate hawk-eagle in size.	
Alcedinidae indet.				About the size of the Collared Kingfisher. First fossil record of the family in Europe.	
Allgoviachen	A. tortonica	HAM 4 HAM 5	Nearly complete leg	Anatid comparable in size to an Egyptian goose	
cf. Mioquerquedula	cf. M. sp.	HAM 4	Three wing and pectoral girdle bones	Tiny anatid even smaller than the smallest extant species	
Anatidae sp. 1		HAM 4		Undetermined medium-sized anatid	
Anatidae sp. 2		HAM 4		Undetermined medium-sized anatid	
Anhinga	A. pannonica	HAM 4 HAM 5	Various postcranial remains	Large sized darter	Humerus of Anhinga pannonica
Apus	cf. A. gaillardi	HAM 4	Left humerus	A very small swift	
Galliformes indet.		HAM 5			
Galliformes indet. 2		HAM 4			
cf. Miophasianus	cf. M. altus	HAM 4			
Gruidae indet.		HAM 4	Dorsal portions of beak and neurocranium	Very large crane, with a skull similar in size and shape to the Siberian crane	
Bavaricarbo	B. brevirostris.	HAM 4		A medium-sized stem-group cormorant	
?Microcarbo	?M. sp.	HAM 4 HAM 5		Very small cormorant, previously identified as Phalacrocoracidae indet.	
cf. Pica	cf. P. sp.	HAM 4		About the size of the Eurasian Magpie	
Strigidae indet.		HAM 4 HAM 5			

=== Mammalia ===
==== Artiodactyla ====
Name	Species	Layer	Material	Notes	Image
Listriodon	L. splendens	HAM 5		A listriodontine suid	Listriodon splendens
Parachleuastochoerus	P. steinheimensis	HAM 5	Perfectly preserved skull	A tetraconodontine suid	
Dorcatherium	D. naui	HAM 5		Large tragulid with pronounced sexual dimorphism	Dorcatherium
Miotragocerus	M. monacensis	HAM 4 HAM 5	Partial skull, postcranial material, teeth, horn cores	Large, boselaphine bovid. Youngest known fossils from this species.	Miotragocerus pannoniae
Boselaphinae indet.		HAM 5			
Euprox	E. furcatus	HAM 5		A cervid	
Muntiacini indet.		HAM 5			
Moschidae indet.		HAM 5			

==== Carnivora ====
===== Caniformia =====
Name	Species	Layer	Material	Notes	Image
Alopecocyon	A. goeriachensis	HAM 5	teeth, mandible	Small, scansorial simocyonine ailurid	
Simocyoninae indet.		HAM 4	molar	Rather large possibly belongs to Protursus	
Amphicyonidae indet.		HAM 5	isolated teeth	Considerably larger than Amphicyon major	
Kretzoiarctos	K. beatrix	HAM 4 HAM 5	teeth	Ailuropodine ursid, opportunistic feeder weighing around 100 kg	Fossil lower jaws of Kretzoiarctos beatrix
Phocidae indet.		HAM 4 HAM 5	teeth	Piscivore, slightly larger than the harbor seal	
Proputorius	P. pusillus	HAM 1	teeth	Tiny (<1 kg), hypocarnivorous mephitid	
Proputorius	P. sansaniensis	HAM 1 HAM 5	teeth	Small (1–3 kg), hypocarnivorous mephitid	
Palaeomeles	P. pachecoi	HAM 5	mandible, teeth	Badger-like mephitid, slightly smaller than Meles	
Circamustela	C. hartmanni	HAM 1 HAM 4 HAM 5	mandible, teeth	Small, hypercarnivorous gulonine	
"Martes"	M. munki	HAM 4 HAM 5	right hemimandible	smaller than "M". sansaniensis	
"Martes"	M. sansaniensis	HAM 4 HAM 5	skull	Rather large (3 kg) marten	
"Martes"	M. sp.	HAM 1	teeth	Small, <1 kg	
Laphyctis	L. mustelinus	HAM 4	molar	Almost wolverine sized gulonine, potentially belongs to the Genus Ischyrictis	
Gulolinae indet.		HAM 5	left hemimandible and left femur	Hypocarnivore, weighing 5 kg	
Eomellivora	E. moralesi	HAM 5	right hemimandible, teeth	Oldest occurrence of the genus, slightly larger than a wolverine	
Lartetictis	L. cf. dubia	HAM 4	left hemimandible, teeth	Semiaquatic mustelid	
Paralutra	P. jaegeri	HAM 4 HAM 5	teeth	Small (<10 kg) otter	
Vishnuonyx	V. neptuni	HAM 4	mandible, teeth	Rather large, piscivorous (10–15 kg) otter	
Trocharion	T. albanense	HAM 4 HAM 5	skull, teeth	House cat sized leptarcine, hypocarnivore	
Potamotherium	P. sp.	HAM 4 HAM 5	isolated teeth	Semiaquatic, piscivorous carnivoran of unclear taxonomic status, comparable in size to the smooth-coated otter	Life restoration of Potamotherium miocenicum.

===== FeliformIa =====
Name	Species	Layer	Material	Notes	Image
Barbourofelidae indet.		HAM 5	right distal humerus	A very large form (>100 kg). Similar fossils have been found in Spain.	
Metailurini indet.		HAM 5	right upper canine	Potentially a connection between Pseudaelurus and Metailurus. Large, similar in size to M. major.	
Pseudaelurus	P. quadridentatus	HAM 5	teeth	Leopard-sized felid	Mandible of Pseudaelurus
Leptofelis	L. vallesiensis	HAM 5		Not mentioned in the review of Hammerschmiede carnivorans	
Hyaenidae indet.			incisor	Very large form (>100 kg). Potentially either belongs to Dinocrocuta or an early crocutoid	
Thalassictis	T. montadai	HAM 4? HAM 5 HAM 6	teeth	Wolf-like ictitheriine hyena	
Semigenetta	S. grandis	HAM 4	teeth	Large (ca. 10 kg) viverrid, hypercarnivore with a similar dietary niche as jackals	
Semigenetta	S. sansaniensis	HAM 1 HAM 4 HAM 5	various remains	Most common carnivoran present. Scansorial omnivore leaning towards meat, with a dietary niche comparable to the small Indian civet. Weight of 1.5–4 kg, individuals from Hammerschmiede closer towards the lower end.	
Viverrictis	V. modica	HAM 4 HAM 5	teeth	Very small (<1 kg), scansorial, insectivorous viverrid	

==== Chiroptera ====
Name	Species	Layer	Material	Notes	Image
Chiroptera indet.	various species	HAM 5			

==== Eulipotyphla ====
Name	Species	Layer	Material	Notes	Image
Plesiosorex	P. schaffneri	HAM 1 HAM 5		A plesiosoricid	
Crusafontina	C. exulta	HAM 1 HAM 3 HAM 5	Maxilla and teeth	A member of the obscure, highly specialized shrew tribe Anourosoricini	
Dinosorex	D. sp. nov.	HAM 5		A soricid	
Paenelimnoecus	P. crouzeli	HAM 5		A soricid	
Soricidae indet. 1		HAM 5			
Soricidae indet. 2		HAM 5			
Desmanella	D. sp.	HAM 5		A talpid related to shrew moles	
Gehardstorchia	G. quinquecuspidata	HAM 1 HAM 5		A talpid	
Proscapanus	P. sp.	HAM 5		A talpid	
Talpa	T. sp.	HAM 5		A talpid	Talpa europaea
Erinaceinae indet.		HAM 5			
Galerix	G. cf. exilis	HAM 3	molars	A galercine, last known Central European occurrence	
Plesiodimylus	P. johanni	HAM 5		A dimylid	
Metacordylodon	M. schlosseri	HAM 5		A dimylid	

==== Lagomorpha ====
Name	Species	Layer	Material	Notes	Image
Eurolagus	E. fontannesi	HAM 1 HAM 5		An ochotonid	
Prolagus	P. oeningensis	HAM 5		An ochotonid	Prolagus oeningensis

==== Primates ====
Name	Species	Layer	Material	Notes	Image
Buronius	B. manfredschmidi	HAM 5	Teeth and a patella	A tiny hominoid	
Danuvius	D. guggenmosi	HAM 5	Partial skeleton, and a variety of additional remains	A small hominoid, potentially capable of bipedalism, although that has been disputed	
Pliopithecidae indet.		HAM 5	Teeth	New species	

==== Perissodactyla ====
Name	Species	Layer	Material	Notes	Image
Anisodon	A. sp.	HAM 5	Teeth and digits	A chalicotheriine chalicothere	Life restoration of Anisodon grande
Schizotheriinae indet.		HAM 4	A patella, and possibly a skull fragment	A schizotheriine chalicothere closely affiliated with Metaschizotherium	
Aceratherium	A. sp.	HAM 1 HAM 4		A hornless rhinoceros	
Hoploaceratherium	H. belvederense	HAM 5		A one-ton heavy, folivorous rhinoceros with a small horn	
Sinohippus	S. sp.	HAM 5		A folivorous, anchitheriine equid	

==== Proboscidea ====
Name	Species	Layer	Material	Notes	Image
Deinotherium	D. levius	HAM 4 HAM 5	Remains of several juveniles and one adult	A deinotheriine proboscidean	Life restoration of Deinotherium giganteum, Naturhistorisches Museum Mainz
Tetralophodon	T.. longirostris	HAM 5 HAM 6	Partial skeleton of an adult, remains of a juvenile	An elephantoid proboscidean	Life restoration of Tetralophodon

==== Rodentia ====
Name	Species	Layer	Material	Notes	Image
Anomalomys	A. gaudryi	HAM 1 HAM 5		An anomalomyid rodent	
Albanesia	A. grimmi	HAM 5		A flying squirrel	
Blackia	B. miocaenica	HAM 5		A flying squirrel	
Miopetaurista	M. crusafonti	HAM 1		A flying squirrel, synonymous with M. albanensis	
Petauristinae indet.		HAM 5			
Spermophilinus	S. bredai	HAM 1 HAM 3 HAM 5		A xerine squirrel	
Chalicomys	C. jaegeri	HAM 4 HAM 5		A semiaquatic castorid	
Steneofiber	S. depereti	HAM 4 HAM 5	Teeth	A medium sized, semiaquatic castorid	
Trogontherium	T. minutus	HAM 1 HAM 4 HAM 5		A semiaquatic castorid, with similarities to Ondatra Also known as Euroxenomys	
Bransatoglis				A glirid rodent	
Eliomys	E. assimilis E. reductus	HAM 5		A glirid rodent	Eliomys quercinus
Glirulus	G. conjunctus	HAM 5		A glirid rodent	Glirulus japonicus
Microdyromys	M. complicatus	HAM 5		A glirid rodent, synonymous with M. miocaenicus	
Muscardinus	M. hispanicus	HAM 5		A glirid rodent	
Myoglis	M. meini	HAM 1 HAM 5		A glirid rodent	
Eomyops	E. catalaunicus	HAM 1 HAM 2 HAM 3 HAM 5	great number of isolated teeth	An eomyid rodent	
Keramidomys	K. sp.	HAM 5		An eomyid rodent	
Collimys	C. hiri	HAM 1 HAM 3 HAM 5	Great number of isolated teeth	A cricetid rodent	
Collimys	C. dobosi		Isolated teeth	A cricetid rodent	
Democricetodon	D. nov. sp.	HAM 1 HAM 5		A cricetid rodent	
Eumyarion	E. latior	HAM 5		A cricetid rodent	
Megacricetodon	M. minutus	HAM 1 HAM 5		A cricetid rodent	
Microtocricetus	M. molassicus	HAM 5		A cricetid rodent	
Neocometes	N. sp.			A platacanthomyid rodent	

== Paleoflora ==
Name	Species	Notes	Image
Caldesia			
Carex			
Ceratophyllum			
Decodon			
Nymphaea			
Potamogeton			
Proserpinaca			
Sambucus			
Sparganium			
Spirematospermum		Belongs to the order Zingiberales and inhabited water-associated habitats	
Stratiotes			
Swida		Junior synonym of Cornus	
Vitis			
