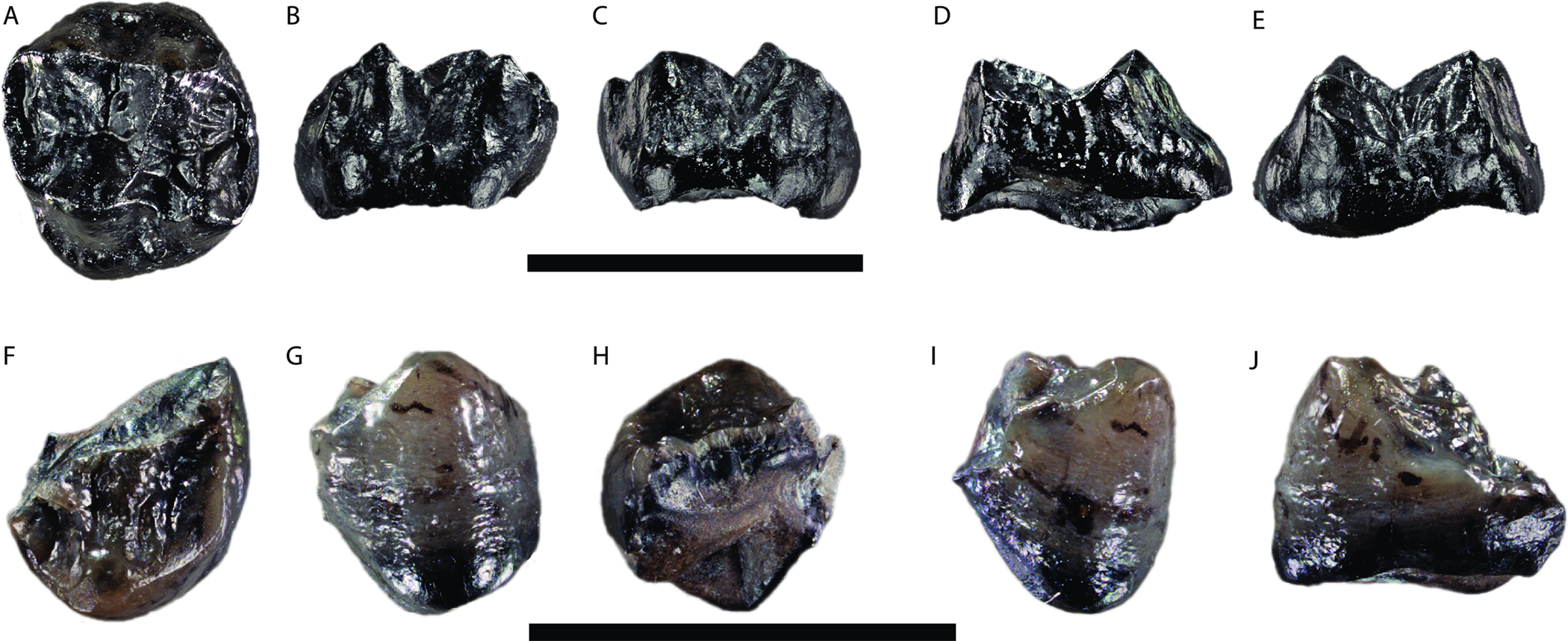
- Fossil teeth assigned to Buronius

Scientific classification
- Kingdom: Animalia
- Phylum: Chordata
- Class: Mammalia
- Infraclass: Placentalia
- Order: Primates
- Superfamily: Hominoidea
- Family: Hominidae
- Genus: †Buronius; Böhme et al., 2024
- Species: †B. manfredschmidi

Binomial name
- †Buronius manfredschmidi Böhme et al., 2024

= Buronius =

Buronius Temporal range: late Miocene, 11.62 Ma

Genus of extinct hominids

Buronius is an extinct genus of hominid from the late Miocene Hammerschmiede clay pit of Bavaria, Germany. The genus contains a single species, B. manfredschmidi, known from two partial teeth and a patella. Buronius may represent the smallest known hominid. The more well-known great ape Danuvius is known from the same locality.

== Discovery and naming ==
The Buronius holotype specimen, GPIT/MA/13005, was discovered in 2011 in sediments of the Hammerschmiede clay pit (HAM 5 level) near Pforzen in the Allgäu region of Bavaria, Germany. The holotype consists of a second molar crown without a root. A fragment of the fourth premolar (GPIT/MA/13004), discovered in 2017, and a left patella (GPIT/MA/10007), also discovered in 2011 near the holotype, were both assigned as paratypes.

In 2024, Böhme et al. described Buronius manfredschmidi as a new genus and species of early hominid based on these fossil remains. The generic name, Buronius, references "Buron", the named used in medieval times for Kaufbeuren, a city near the type locality. The specific name, manfredschmidi, honours fossil collector Manfred Schmid.

As the Buronius fossil material is very fragmentary—especially in comparison to the coeval hominid Danuvius—some researchers have expressed concern regarding the taxon's validity, explaining that additional bones would be needed to confidently distinguish the two genera.

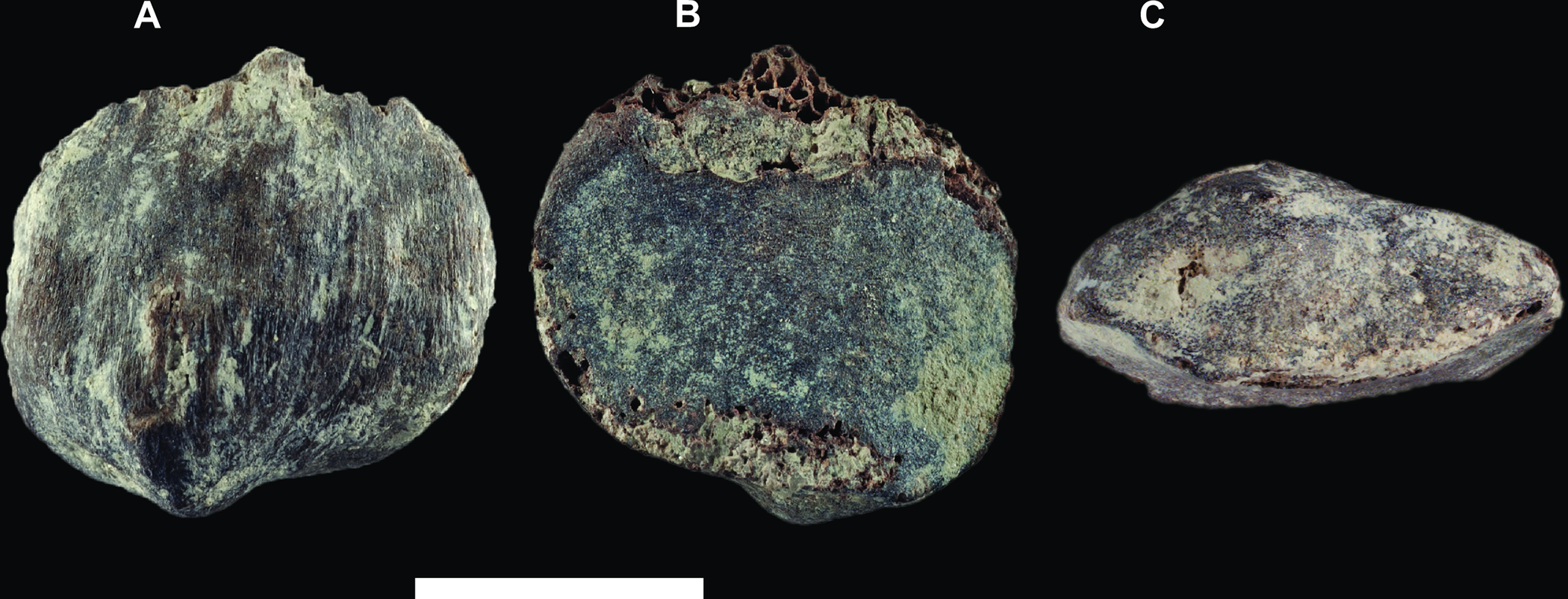
Fossil patella from a juvenile Buronius individual

== Description ==
Weighing an estimated 10 kilograms (22 lb), Buronius likely represents the smallest hominid taxon currently known.
