= Sansan paleontological site =

Fossil site in France

- Stratigraphic range: Langhian
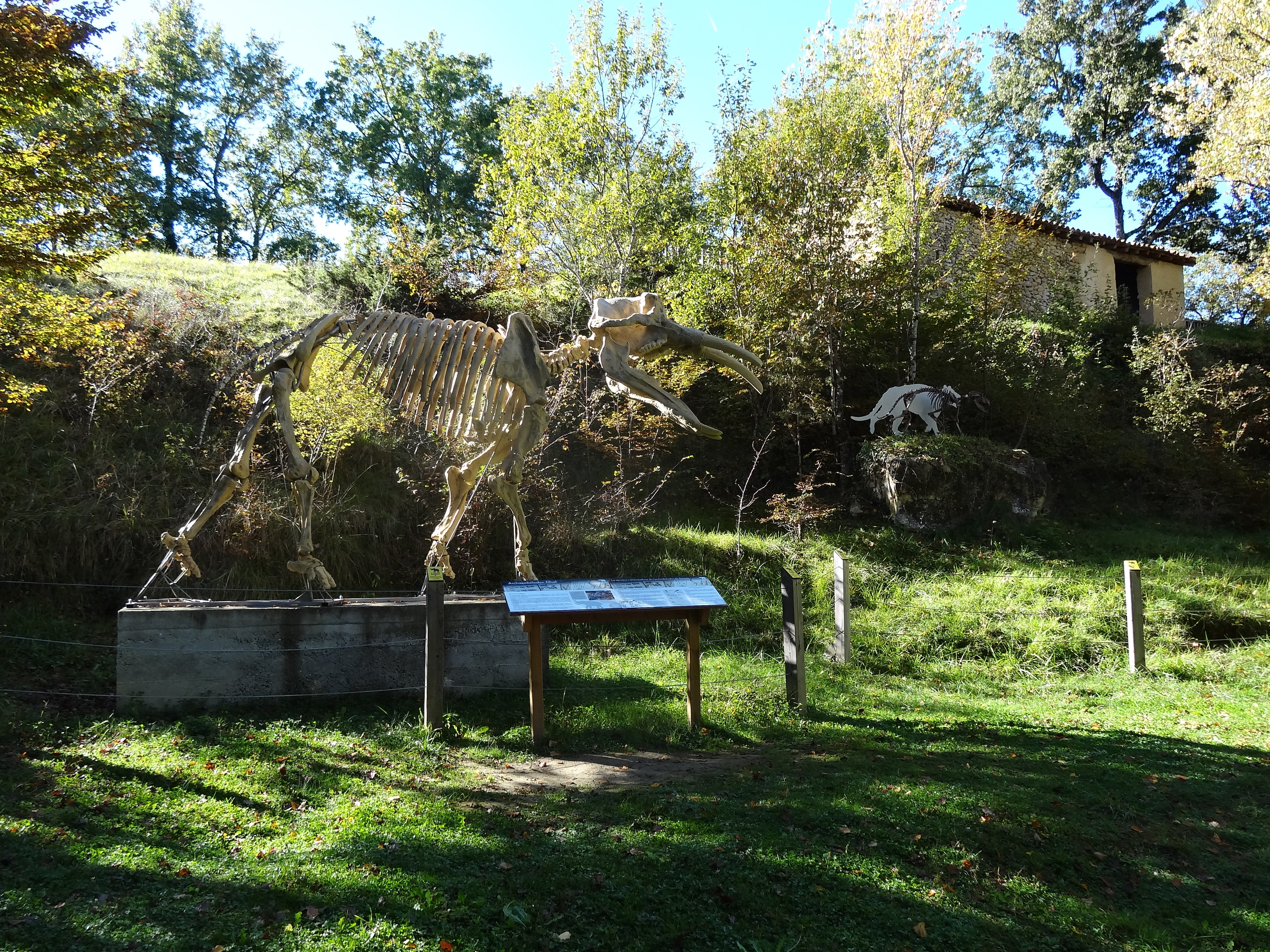
- Type: Fossil site

Location
- Coordinates: 43.524315°N 0.622332°E
- Region: Occitanie
- Country: France

Type section
- Named by: Lartet, 1834
- Sansan paleontological site (France)

The Sansan paleontological site (locally au Campané) is a Miocene fossil deposit in Sansan, in the French department of Gers.

Searched by Edouard Lartet until 1847, it was considered useful for Science and is registered by the Inventaire national du Patrimoine Géologique (InPG) as an international-level site. It constitutes one of the most important Middle Cenozoic deposits and is well known in palaeontological circles. The National Museum of Natural History bought 4 hectares (9.9 acres) of terrain in 1848 and oversee any research on the site since then. The research stopped in 1999. The site has been open to the public since 2018.

== Location ==
The paleontological site is located inside the commune of Sansan, on the Campané hill at 238 m (781 ft) above sea level, in the Gers department, 16 km (9.9 mi) south of Auch. The hill and its surroundings were historically called "Camp de las hossos".

== Recent history ==
The deposits were excavated regularly from 1834 to 1999. Francis Duranthon from the Toulouse Museum and Pascal Tassy from the Paris Museum were the last researchers to have worked on Sansan, specifically on the southern flank.

Outcrops were backfilled, vegetation grew back and a paleontological trail was created in 2018 by the Communauté de communes du Val de Gers. Today, research have stopped but the site is open for public access. A 2.5 km (1.6 mi) trail, marked by interpretive panels, helps to teach how Edouard Lartet discovered the site and how his discovery revolutionized the scientific theories of the time and exposed the richness of its Miocene fauna and flora.

The paleontological trail

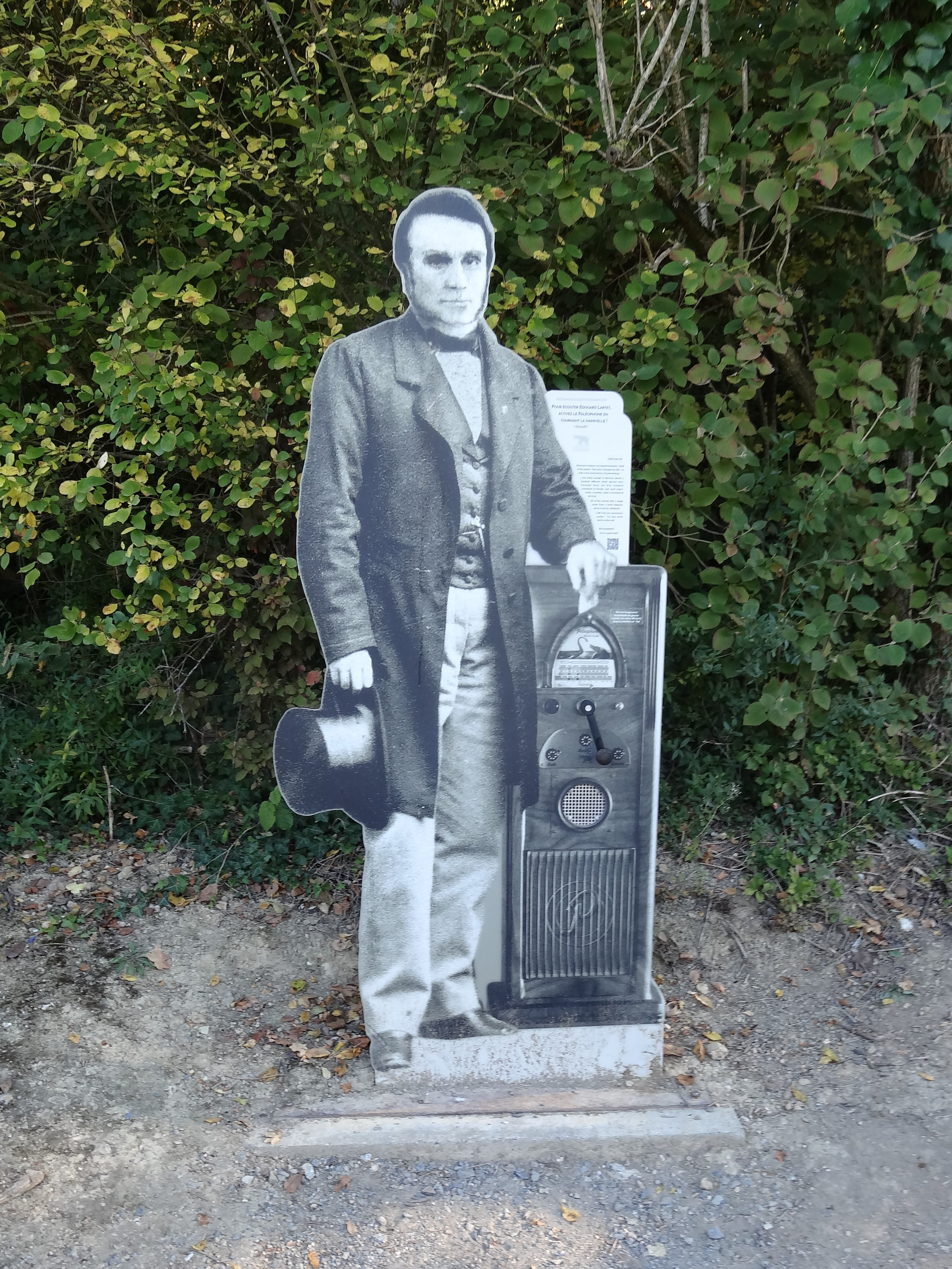
Panel of Édouard Lartet at the beginning of the trail

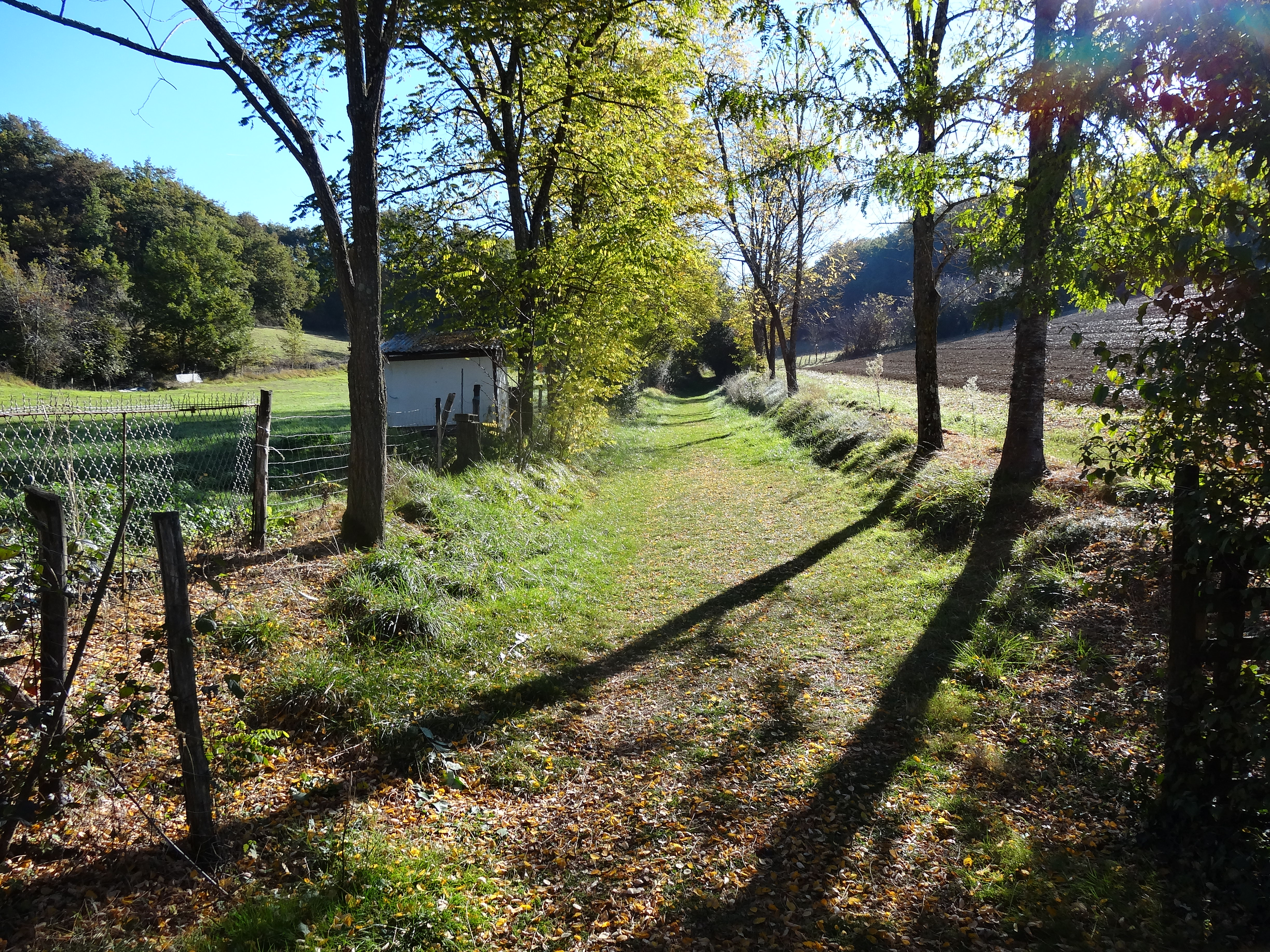
The trail

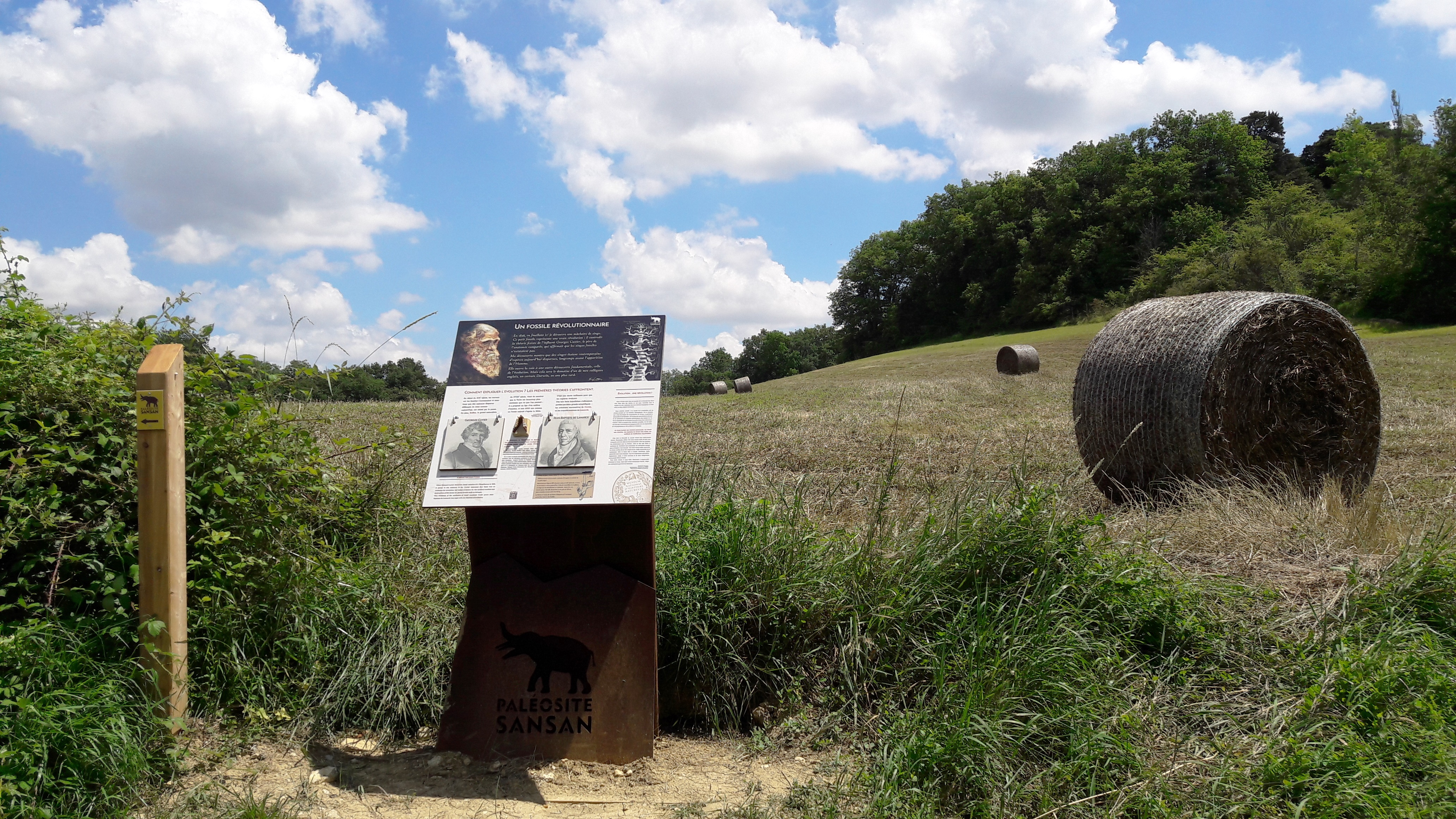
Interpretive panel on the trail

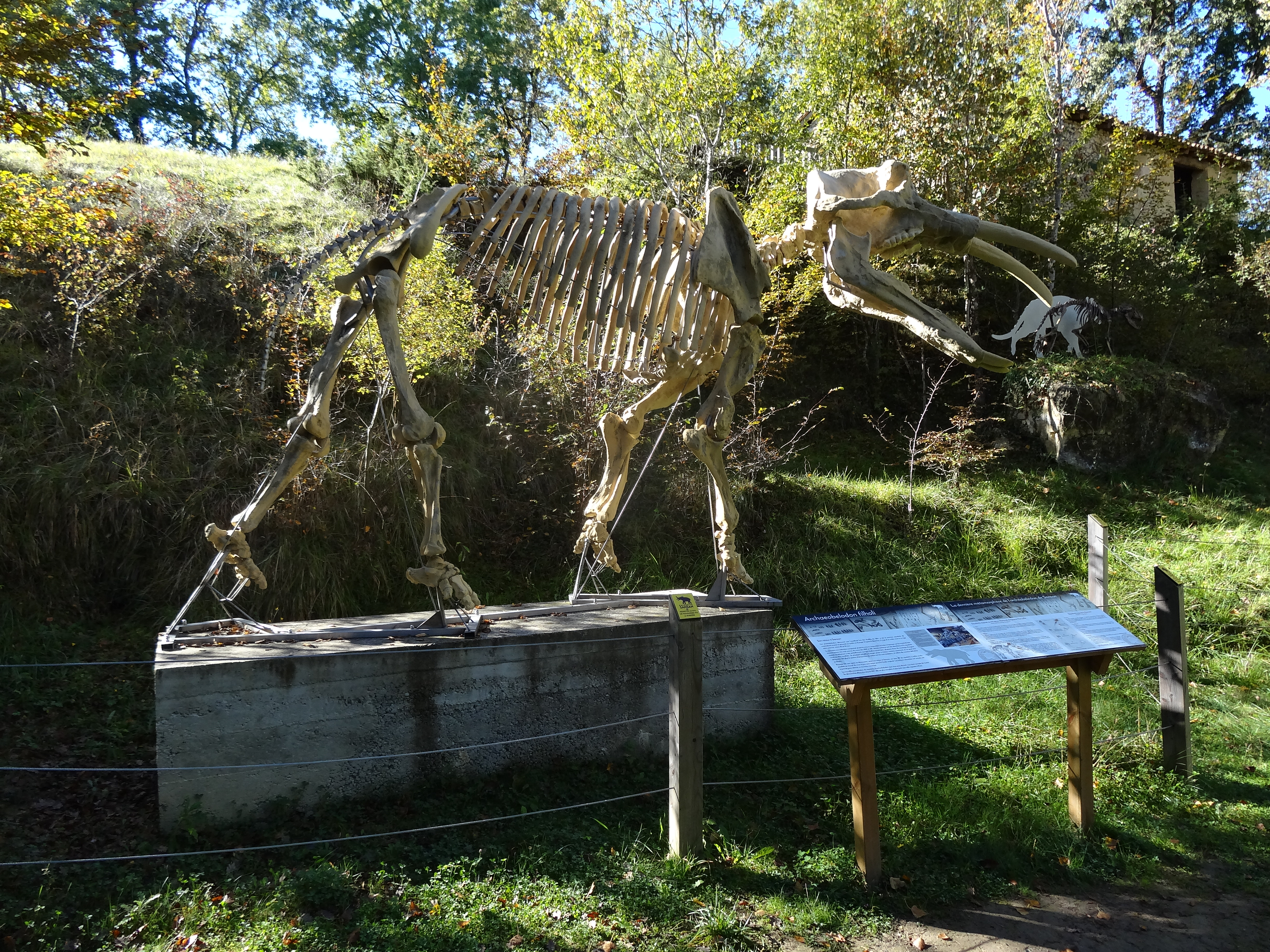
Archaeobelodon skeleton near the Ferme du Campané

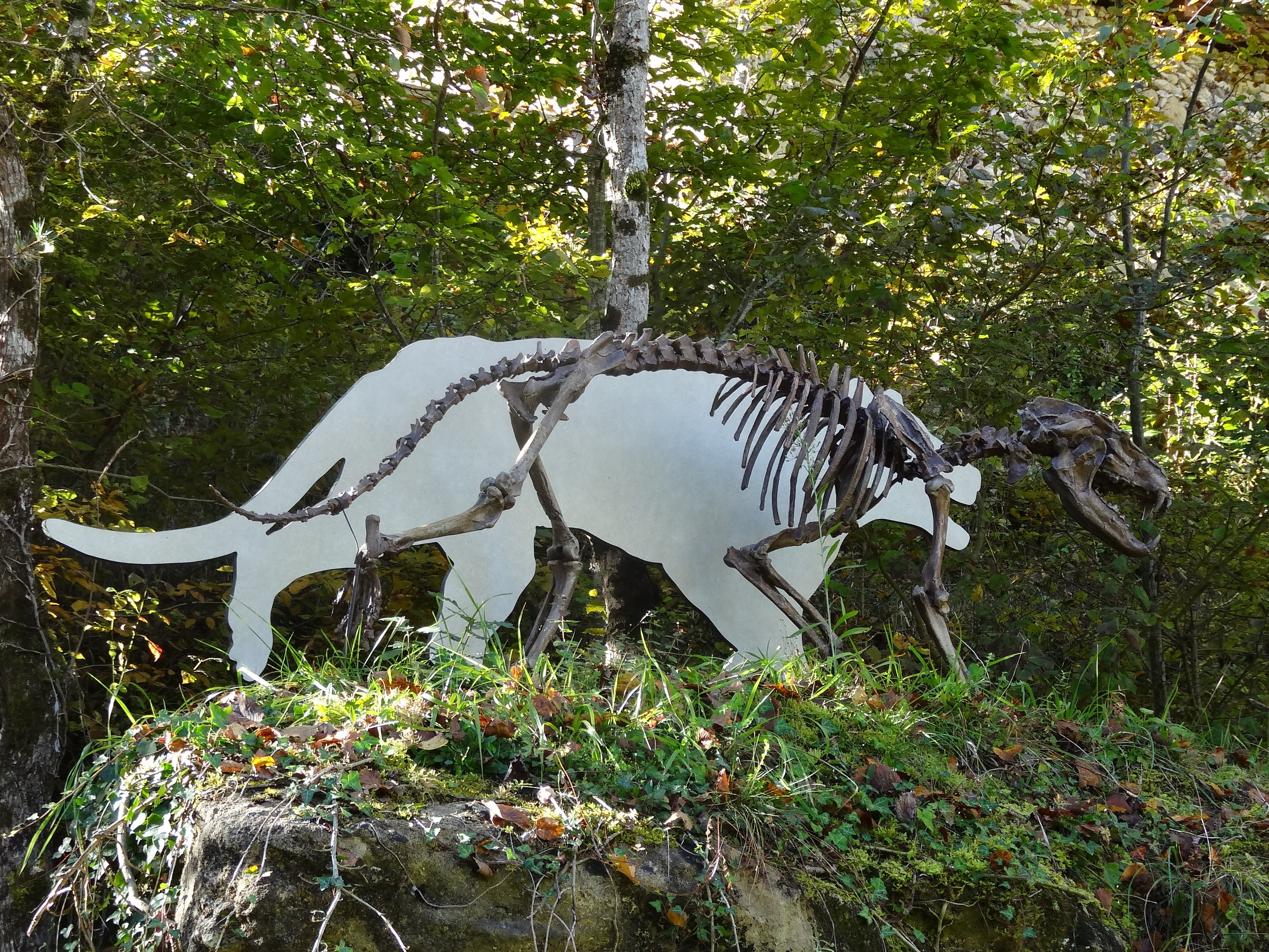
Amphycion skeleton

== Fossil Species ==
The site of Sansan gave 85 mammal species from 9 orders, 30 families and 75 genera, being one of the richest Miocene sites in Europe. One of the most important discoveries on the site was the description by Edouard Lartet in 1837 of Pliopithecus, a catarrhini monkey, which was a keystone in the reject of creationism by scientists and the advance towards the evolution theory.

The first fossil was discovered in 1834 by the shepherd Joseph Débats, who lived on the hilltop. It was a proboscidean molar. He told the Gers lawyer Edouard Lartet, who explored the site. The Sansan mastodont, Archaeobelodon, was entirely reconstructed in 1851 by Laurillard, a first in Europe.

Edouard Lartet describes in 1834 a large carnivore, which he named Amphicyon major.

The first fossils of the chalicothere species Anisodon grande were also recovered in Sansan.

== Mammals ==
=== Chiroptera ===
Genus	Species	Order	Images
Pteropodidae gen. indet.	sp. indet	Pteropodidae	
Kerivoula	K. murinoides	Vespertilionidae	
Paleptesicus	P. noctuloides	Vespertilionidae	
Eptesicus	E. campanensis	Vespertilionidae	
Myotis	M. ziegleri	Vespertilionidae	
Mormopterus	M. helveticus	Molossidae	

=== Proboscidea ===
Genus	Species	Family	Images
Gomphotherium	G. angustidens	Gomphotheriidae	
Archaeobelodon	A. filholi	Gomphotheriidae	
Deinotherium	D. giganteum	Deinotheriidae	
Prodeinotherium	P. bavaricum	Deinotheriidae	
Zygolophodon	Z. turicensis	Mammutidae	

=== Perissodactyla ===
Genus	Species	Family	Images
Anchitherium	A. aurelianense hippoides	Equidae	
Anisodon	A. grande	Chalicotheriidae	
Aceratherium	A. (Alicornops) simorrense	Rhinocerotidae	
Brachypotherium	B. brachypus	Rhinocerotidae	
Lartetotherium	L. sansaniense	Rhinocerotidae	

=== Artiodactyla ===
Genus	Species	Family	Images
Micromeryx	M. flourentianus	Moschidae	
Dicrocerus	D. elegans	Cervidae	
Heteroprox	H. larteti	Cervidae	
Eotragus	E. clavatus	Bovidae	
cf. Ampelomeryx	cf. A. magnus	Palaeomerycidae	
Choeromorus	C. mammillatus	Palaeomerycidae	
Dorcatherium	D. crassum	Tragulidae	
Listriodon	L. splendens	Suidae	
Conohyus	C. simorrensis	Suidae	

=== Rodentia ===
Genus	Species	Family	Images
Euroxenomys	E. minutus	Castoridae	
Steneofiber	S. sp. aff. S. eseri	Castoridae	
Eumyarion	E. medius	Cricetidae	
Cricetodon	C. sansaniensis	Cricetidae	
Democricetodon	D. gaillardi	Cricetidae	
Democricetodon	D. sp. aff. D. gracilis	Cricetidae	
Megacricetodon	M. gersii		
Megacricetodon	M. minor	Cricetidae	
Keramidomys	K. carpathicus octaviae		
Keramidomys	K. mohleri	Eomyidae	
Albanensia	A. sansaniensis	Sciuridae	
Blackia	B. miocaenica	Sciuridae	
Spermophilinus	S. bredai	Sciuridae	
Heteroxerus	H. grivensis	Sciuridae	
Tamias	T. minutus	Sciuridae	
Palaeosciurus	P. sp. cf. P. minutus	Sciuridae	
Sciuridae gen. indet.		Sciuridae	

=== Lagomorpha ===
Genus	Species	Family	Images
Prolagus	P. oeningensis sansaniensis	Ochotonidae	
Lagopsis	L. sp. aff. L. verus	Ochotonidae	
Leporidae indet.			

=== Primates ===
Genus	Species	Family	Images
Pliopithecus	P. antiquus	Pliopithecidae	
Plesiopliopithecus	P. auscitanensis	Pliopithecidae	

=== Insectivora ===
Genus	Species	Family	Images
Dinosorex	D. sansaniensis	Soricidae	
Lartetium	L. prevostianum	Soricidae	
Miosorex	M. desnoyersianus	Soricidae	
Hemisorex	H. robustus	Soricidae	
Paenelimnoecus	P. crouzeli	Soricidae	
Soricidae indet.	L. prevostianum	Soricidae	
Mygalea	M. antiqua	Talpidae	
Proscapanus	P. sansaniensis	Talpidae	
Proscapanus	P. sp.	Talpidae	
Talpa	T. minuta	Talpidae	
Plesiodimylus	P. sp. aff. P. chantrei	Dimylidae	
Galerix	G. exilis	Erinaceidae	
Galerix	G. sp.	Erinaceidae	
Lanthanotherium	L. sansaniense	Erinaceidae	
Atelerix	A. depereti	Erinaceidae	
Postpalerinaceus	P. intermedius	Erinaceidae	

=== Carnivora ===
Genus	Species	Family	Images
Sivanasua	D. sp. indet.	Lophocyonidae	
Amphicyon	A. major	Amphicyonidae	
Pseudocyon	P. sansaniensis	Amphicyonidae	
Alopecocyon	A. goeriachensis	Ailuridae	
Hemicyon	H. sansaniensis	Ursidae	
Ursidae gen. indet.	sp. indet.	Ursidae	
Plithocyon	P. armagnacensis	Ursidae	
Pseudaelurus	P. quadridentatus	Felidae	
Styriofelis	S. lorteti	Felidae	
Styriofelis	S. turnauensis	Felidae	
Sansanosmilus	S. palmidens	Nimravidae	
Ischyrictis	I. zibethoides	Mustelidae	
Martes	M. sansaniensis	Mustelidae	
Proputorius	P. sansaniensis	Mustelidae	
Mustelidae indet.		Mustelidae	
Taxodon	T. sansaniensis	Mustelidae	
Lartetictis	L. dubia	Mustelidae	
Semigenetta	S. sansaniensis	Viverridae	
Viverrictis	V. modica	Viverridae	
Leptoplesictis	L. atarus	Herpestidae	
Carnivora indet.	sp. indet.	Carnivora	
Carnivora indet.	sp. indet.	Carnivora	

== Reptiles ==
=== Squamata ===
Genus	Species	Family	Images
Pseudopus	P. laurillardi	Anguidae	

=== Testudines ===
Genus	Species	Family	Images
Paleotestudo	P. canetotiana	Testudinidae	

=== Accipitriformes ===
Genus	Species	Family	Images
Haliaeetus piscator	H. piscator	Accipitridae	

=== Anseriformes ===
Genus	Species	Family	Images
Chenoanas	C. sansaniensis	Anatidae	
