= Danuvius =

Danuvius may refer to:

- Danube – river in Europe; Danuvius in Latin
- Danuvius (deity) – ancient Roman river god
- Danuvius guggenmosi – extinct great ape
