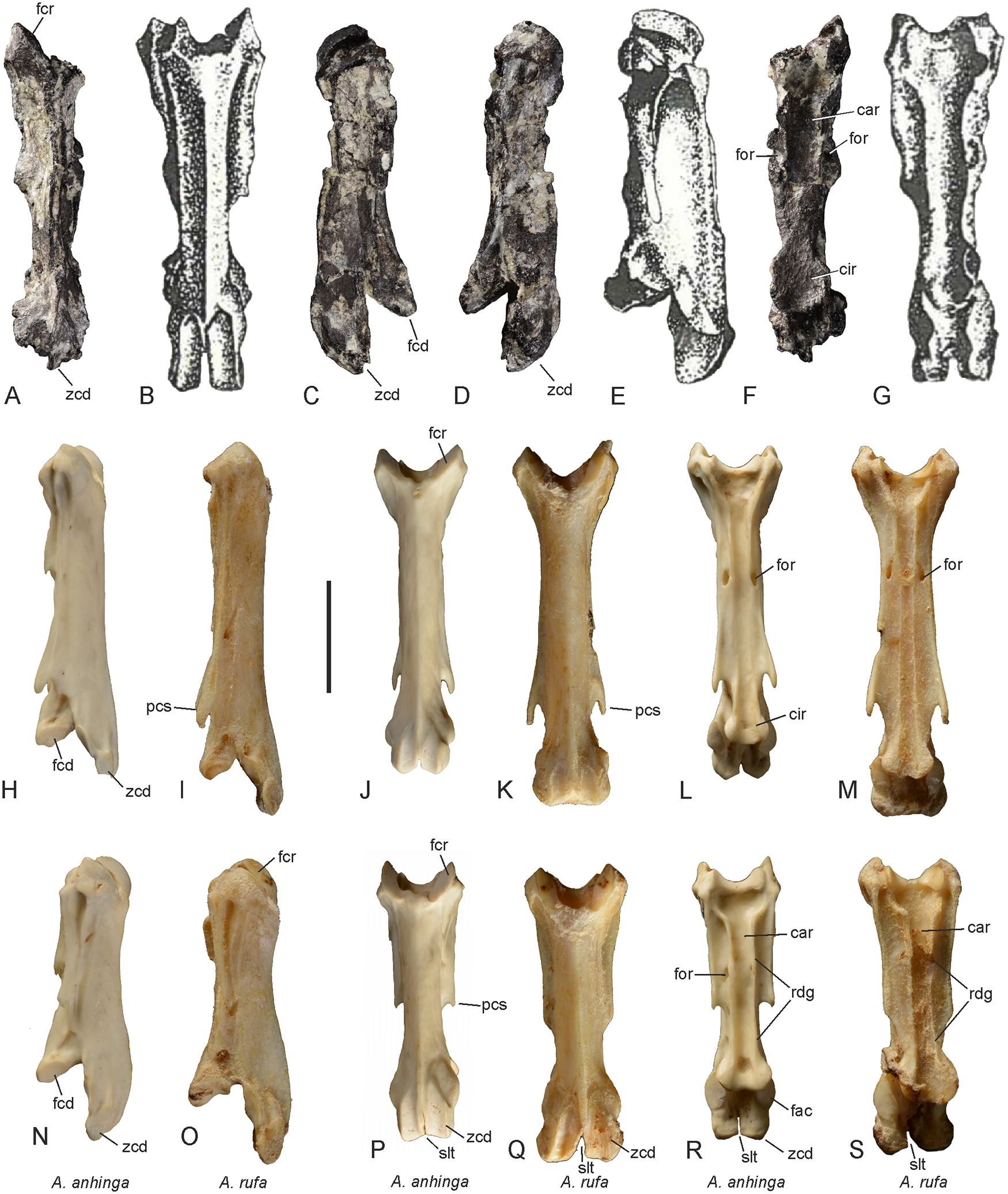
- Cervical vertebra of A. pannonica (A-G) compared to extant species

Scientific classification
- Kingdom: Animalia
- Phylum: Chordata
- Class: Aves
- Order: Suliformes
- Family: Anhingidae
- Genus: Anhinga
- Species: †A. pannonica

Binomial name
- †Anhinga pannonica (Lambrecht, 1916)

= Anhinga pannonica =

Anhinga pannonica Temporal range: Miocene-16–6 Ma

Extinct species of darter

Anhinga pannonica is an extinct species of darter from the Miocene of Europe and Africa. Described in 1916, A. pannonica is the only species of darter to have existed in Europe and is notably larger than most extant species, with an estimated weight of 3.3 kg (7.3 lb). The species likely went extinct as the climate continued to cool towards the end of the Miocene and beginning Pliocene, heavily effecting the darter that would have required a subtropical or tropical climate to survive.

== History and naming ==
Anhinga pannonica was the first fossil darter scientifically described from Europe. The holotype, the sixth cervical vertebrae of the animal, was found in the Romanian Tataros locality and described by Hungarian paleontologist Kálmán Lambrecht in 1916. Lambrecht described the animal as Plotus pannonicus, the genus name now being a junior synonym of Anhinga. A carpometacarpus was recovered from the same locality and subsequently assigned to the species as well. The combination Anhinga pannonica was established by Pierce Brodkorb in 1963, utilizing the senior synonym Anhinga and adjusting the species accordingly. 1972 came the first remains of Anhinga pannonica outside of Europe with the discovery of remains in the Tunisian Beglia Formation, followed by additional remains found in Europe and Africa during the 90s and 2000s.

Substantial remains were also found in Germany, in particular the Hammerschmiede locality in Bavaria, which yielded 10 fossil bones belonging to 5 individuals. In the same publication the authors also take note of several bird remains from the Regensburg-Dechbetten locality previously described by Ludwig von Ammon as species of cormorants and herons (Phalacrocorax brunhuber, Ardea brunhuberi & Botaurites avitus). Following the description of von Ammon, Brotkorb placed them all in the species Phalacrocorax brunhuber, while Mayr et al. (2020) argue that the remains all belong to Anhinga pannonica. As some authors have suggested that Phalacrocorax brunhuber may be synonymous with Phalacrocorax intermedius, it is possible that the later name takes precedence over Anhinga pannonica. However closer examination of P. intermedius material would be needed to determine this.

== Description ==
Anhinga pannonica was a large darter, being described as having a humerus longer than any extant anhinga species and comparable in size to Anhinga grandis from North America. All limb bones are 15% larger than those of its extant relatives and much closer in size to those of the modern Great Cormorant. Based on the circumference of the femur, it is estimated that A. pannonica weighed approximately 3.3 kg (7.3 lb). In weight this species falls between the maximum recorded mass of extant species (1–1.8 kg (2.2–4.0 lb)) and some of the giant darters of South America (5.4–25 kg (12–55 lb)).

== Distribution ==
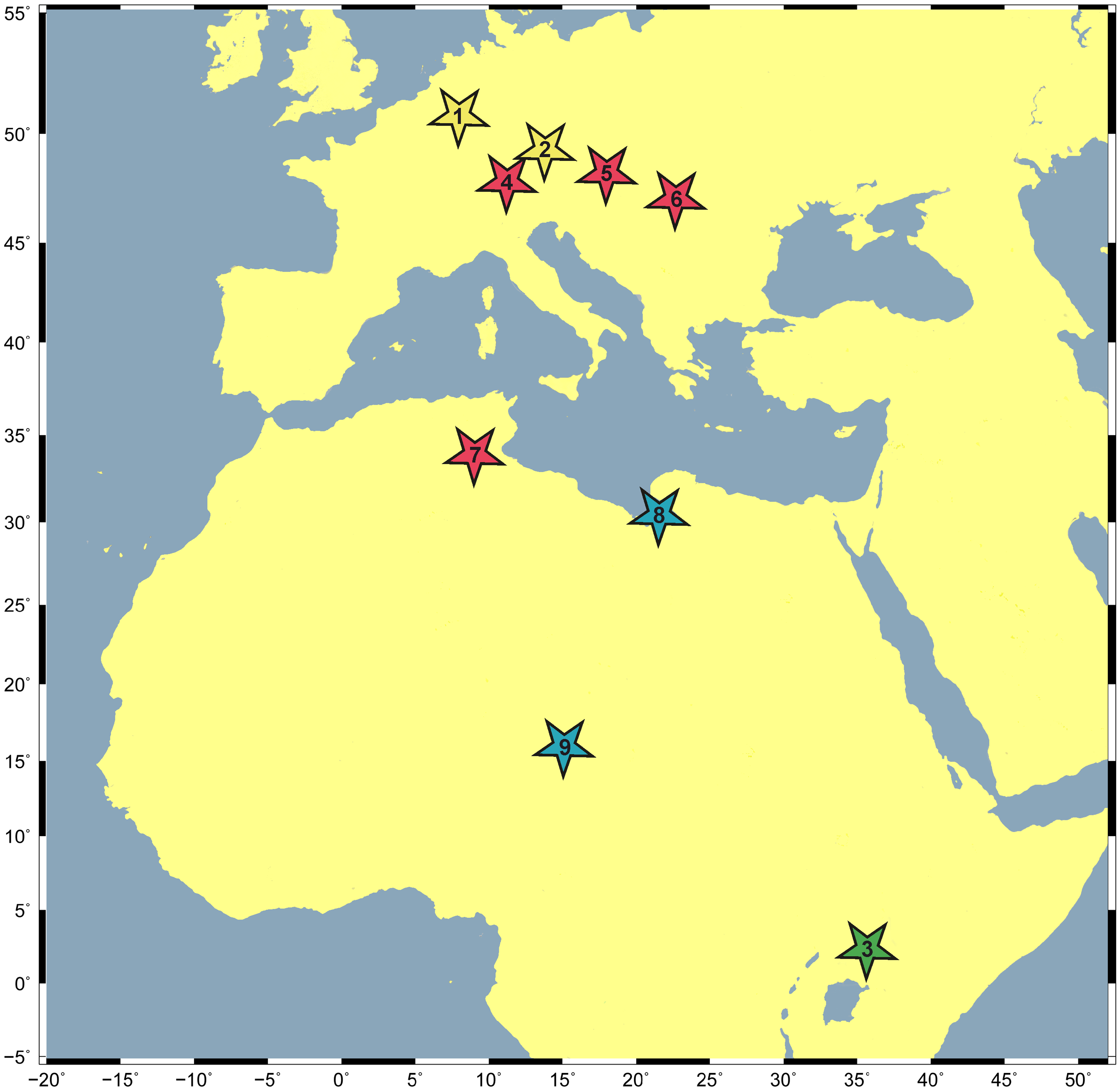
Distribution map of Anhinga pannonica

Fossils of Anhinga pannonica are known throughout various parts of Africa and Eurasia, corresponding with rock layers Miocene to Pliocene in age. In Africa remains have been found in the Beglia Formation (Tunisia, ca. 11-10 Ma), Toros-Menalla (Chad, 7 Ma) and the Ngorora Formation (Kenya, 13-12 Ma), which marks its southernmost records. Additionally a large, unidentified darter was discovered in the Sahabi Formation (Libya, Late Miocene). In Asia fossils referred to A. pannonica have been found in Pakistan (Late Miocene) and Thailand (16 Ma), however this identification is considered to be questionable given their smaller size and in need of revision.

Besides the type locality in Romania (10 Ma), records in Europe are known from Götzendorf (Austria, 9.8-9 Ma), the Hambach surface mine (Germany, 16-15.2 Ma), Regensburg-Dechbetten (Germany, middle Miocene) and the Hammerschmiede clay pit (Germany, 11.6-11.4 Ma). Putative remains were discovered in Hungary (13.5-11 Ma). Should Phalacrocorax intermedius prove to be synonymous with Phalacrocorax brunhuber and by extension Anhinga pannonica, the range within Europe would also include France and the Czech Republic.

Disregarding the uncertain remains from Hungary and Asia, as well as those of Phalacrocorax intermedius, Anhinga pannonica is known from nine localities across Europe and Africa spanning a total of 10 million years. The oldest of these remains are from the Bavarian sediments dating to approximately 16-15 Ma, which also mark the northernmost extent of the species. During the early stages of the Late Miocene the darter was seemingly widespread around the Mediterranean, while the last known fossils of the bird stem from Messinian North Africa, approximately 7-6 Ma.

== Paleobiology ==
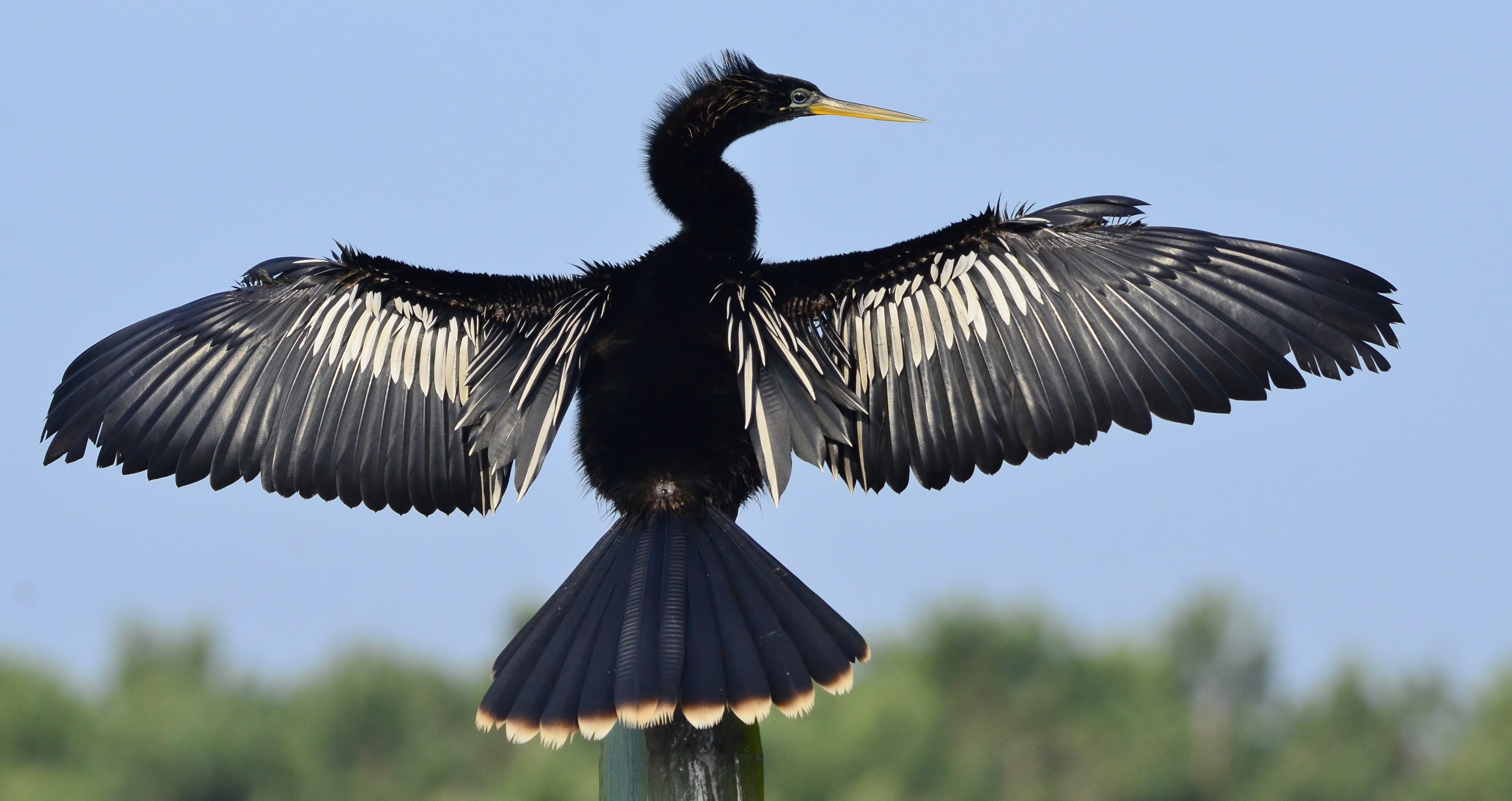
A modern anhinga displaying its typical basking behavior

Unlike many other waterbirds such as ducks or pelicans, anhingas do not cover their feathers in an oily excretion which allows them to soak up waters. With their plumage soaking up waters, anhingas decrease buoyancy while diving for prey, giving them an advantage while foraging. However as a downside these birds are prone to heat loss and restricts their modern range to subtropical and tropical environments. To counteract the heat loss, darters are known to strike a characteristic pose while perching, sunning themselves with widely extended wingtips. It is possible that, in addition to this behavior, large extinct anhingas such as A. pannonica specifically grew to their respective sizes to counteract heat loss, as an increase in volume in relation to surface area is generally favorable for retaining heat. This matches the fact that Anhinga pannonica is known from warm environments such as the Kenyan Ngorora Formation and the Hammerschmiede locality in Germany, which is thought to have been a warm, subtropical fluvial environment with a mean annual temperature of over 20 °C. Consequently, Anhinga pannonica disappeared from Europe as temperatures gradually sank towards the end of the Miocene, becoming too cold to support its great size and sensitivity to heat loss. Its extinction in Africa, as well as the demise of the giant Neotropic anhingas however remain unclear.

Like its modern relatives, Anhinga pannonica inhabited areas rich in freshwater such as rivers. In the case of the Hammerschmiede locality, it inhabited floodplains with meandering rivers. The older deposits (HAM 5, 11.62 Ma) preserve a small channel 4–5 m (13–16 ft) wide and 0.8–1 m (2 ft 7 in – 3 ft 3 in) deep, while the younger HAM 4 deposits (11.44 Ma) show a medium-sized river 50 m (160 ft) across and 4–5 m (13–16 ft) deep. Both channels are asymmetrical with a notably deeper outer bank and a slow flow velocity. Anhingas are generally shallow water divers, specialised in depths of <0.5 m (1 ft 8 in). Prey was present through a diverse fossil fish fauna including catfish, barbs, loaches, minnows, gobies and perches. Other waterbirds found in the area include cranes, cormorants, kingfishers and waterfowl. The giant salamander Andrias scheuchzeri also inhabited this region.
