= Rieden, Swabia =

Rieden
- Municipality
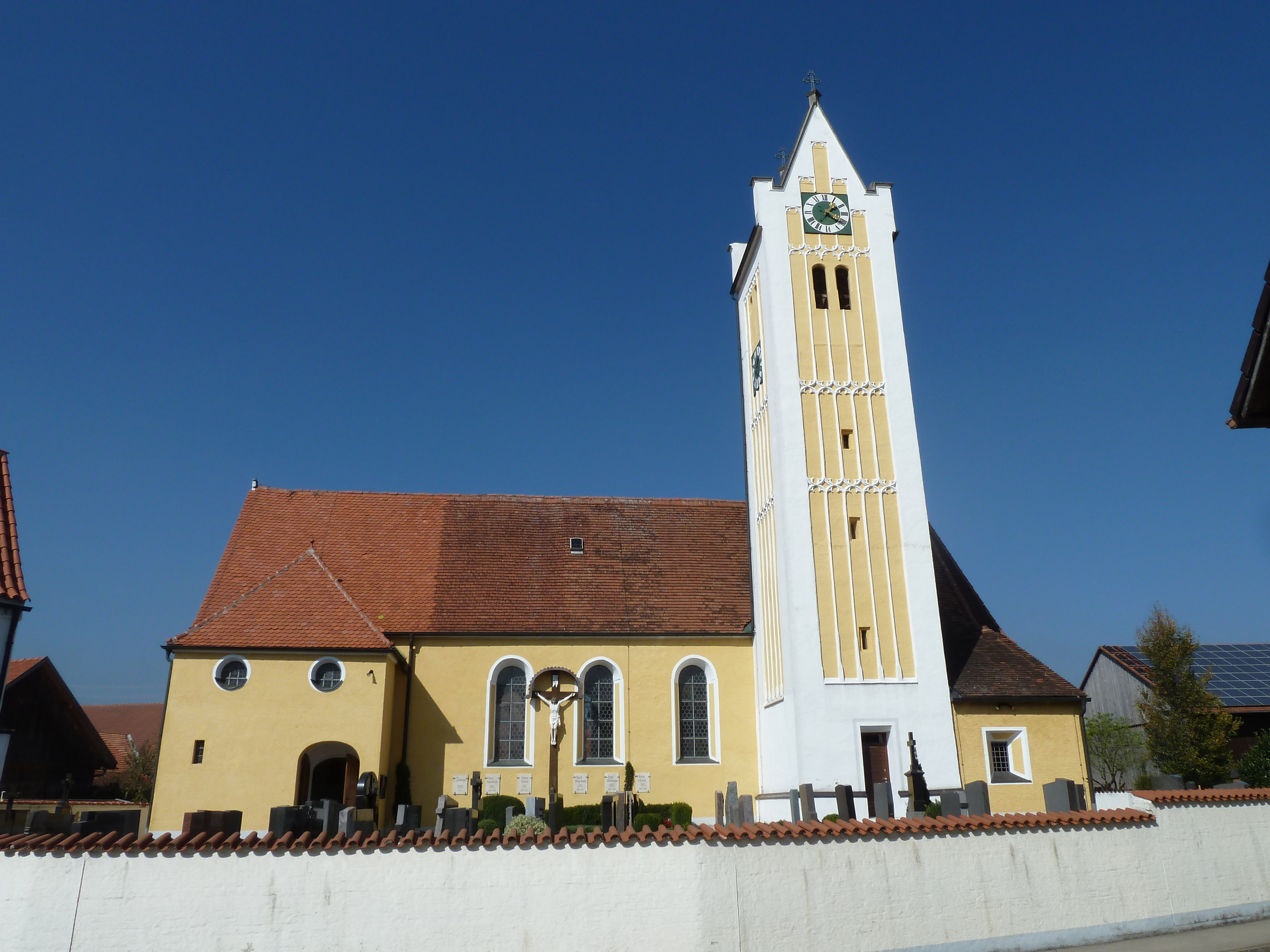
- Church of Saint Martin

- Coat of arms

- Location of Rieden within Ostallgäu district
- Interactive map of Rieden
- Location within Germany Location within Bavaria
- Coordinates: 47°57′N 10°39′E
- Country: Germany
- State: Bavaria
- Admin. region: Schwaben
- District: Ostallgäu
- Municipal assoc.: Pforzen

Government
  - Mayor (2020–26): Ingeborg Weiß (FW)

Area
  - Total: 8.41 km^{2} (3.25 sq mi)
- Elevation: 659 m (2,162 ft)

Population (2025-12-31)
  - Total: 1,461
  - Density: 174/km^{2} (450/sq mi)
- Time zone: UTC+01:00 (CET)
  - Summer (DST): UTC+02:00 (CEST)
- Postal codes: 87668
- Dialling codes: 08346
- Vehicle registration: OAL
- Website: www.rieden-zellerberg.de

Rieden (German pronunciation: [ˈʁiːdn̩]) is a municipality in the district of Ostallgäu in Bavaria in Germany.
