= Bavaricarbo =

Bavaricarbo Temporal range: 11.6 Ma
- Fossil of the rostrum of B. brevirostris

Scientific classification
- Kingdom: Animalia
- Phylum: Chordata
- Class: Aves
- Order: Suliformes
- Family: Phalacrocoracidae
- Genus: †Bavaricarbo
- Species: †B. brevirostris

Binomial name
- †Bavaricarbo brevirostris Mayr, Lechner & Böhme, 2026

Extinct genus of birds

Bavaricarbo is an extinct genus of cormorant (family Phalacrocoracidae) from the Miocene Hammerschmiede clay pit, Germany. The type and only species is B. brevirostris.
