= Pforzen (Verwaltungsgemeinschaft) =

- Verwaltungsgemeinschaft
- Location of Pforzen within Ostallgäu district
- Interactive map of Pforzen
- Location within Germany Location within Bavaria
- Coordinates: 47°56′N 10°37′E
- Country: Germany
- State: Bavaria
- Admin. region: Swabia
- District: Ostallgäu
- Seat: Pforzen
- Subdivisions: 3 municipalities

Area
  - Total: 49.54 km^{2} (19.13 sq mi)

Population (2025-12-31)
  - Total: 5,501
  - Density: 111.0/km^{2} (287.6/sq mi)
- Time zone: UTC+01:00 (CET)
  - Summer (DST): UTC+02:00 (CEST)
- Website: www.vg-pforzen.de

Pforzen is a Verwaltungsgemeinschaft (municipal association) in the district Ostallgäu in Bavaria, Germany. Its seat is in Pforzen.

It consists of the following municipalities:

1. Irsee
2. Pforzen
3. Rieden
