= Mioaetus =

Mioaetus Temporal range: 11.6 Ma

Scientific classification
- Kingdom: Animalia
- Phylum: Chordata
- Class: Aves
- Order: Accipitriformes
- Family: Accipitridae
- Genus: †Mioaetus
- Species: †M. pforzenensis

Binomial name
- †Mioaetus pforzenensis Mayr, Lechner & Böhme, 2026

Extinct genus of birds

Mioaetus (meaning "Miocene eagle") is an extinct genus of accipitrid from the Miocene of the Hammerschmiede clay pit in Germany. The type and only species is M. pforzenensis.
