= Danuvius guggenmosi =

Danuvius guggenmosi Temporal range: Serravallian–Tortonian (c. 11.6 Ma)

Scientific classification
- Kingdom: Animalia
- Phylum: Chordata
- Class: Mammalia
- Infraclass: Placentalia
- Order: Primates
- Superfamily: Hominoidea
- Family: Hominidae
- Subfamily: Homininae
- Tribe: †Dryopithecini
- Genus: †Danuvius; Böhme et al., 2019
- Species: †D. guggenmosi

Binomial name
- †Danuvius guggenmosi Böhme et al., 2019

Extinct great ape from Miocene Europe

Danuvius guggenmosi is an extinct species of great ape that lived 11.6 million years ago during the Middle–Late Miocene in southern Germany. It is the sole member of the genus Danuvius. The area at this time was probably a woodland with a seasonal climate. A male specimen was estimated to have weighed about 31 kg (68 lb), and two females 17 and 19 kg (37 and 42 lb). Both genus and species were described in November 2019.

It is the first-discovered Late Miocene great ape with preserved long bones which could be used to reconstruct the limb anatomy and thus the locomotion of contemporary apes. Its discoverer, paleoanthropologist Madelaine Böhme, says Danuvius had adaptations for both hanging in trees (suspensory behavior) and walking on two legs (bipedalism)—whereas, among present-day great apes, humans are better adapted for the latter and the others the former. Danuvius thus had a method of locomotion unlike any previously known ape called "extended limb clambering", she says, walking directly along tree branches as well as using arms for suspending itself. The last common ancestor between humans and other apes possibly had a similar method of locomotion. However, paleoanthropologist Scott Williams and others say the fragmentary remains do not differ enough from other fossil apes to provide such a clue to the origins of bipedalism.

== Taxonomy ==
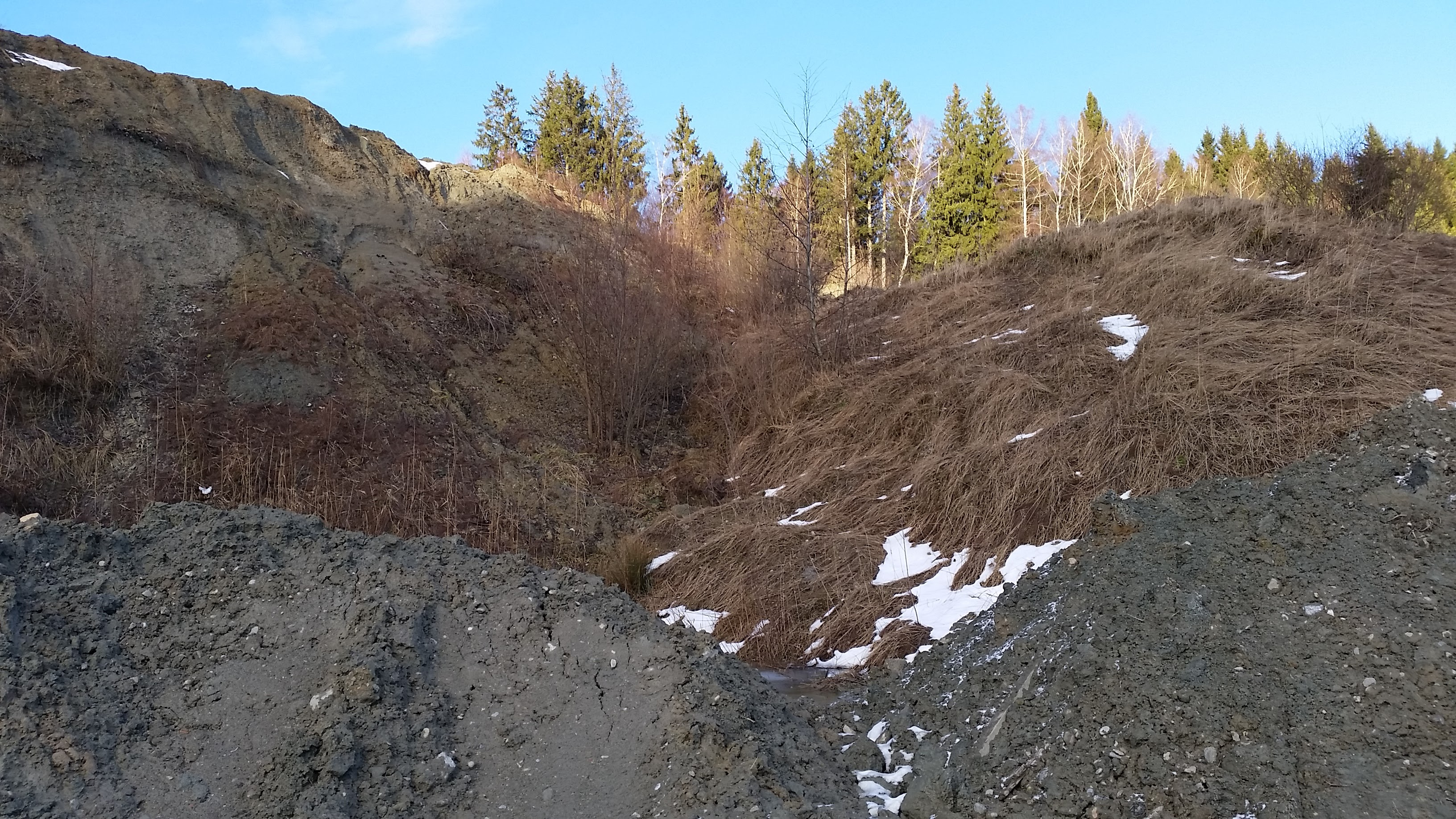
Hammerschmiede clay pit near Pforzen, where the fossils were found

The genus name Danuvius is a reference to the Celtic–Roman river-god Danuvius, a Roman name for the river Danube, which flows through the region where the remains were found. The specific name guggenmosi honours the amateur archaeologist Sigulf Guggenmos (1941–2018), who discovered the clay pit in which Danuvius was found.

The remains of Danuvius were discovered in the Hammerschmiede clay pit near the town of Pforzen in southern Germany, magnetostratigraphically dated to 11.62 million years ago (mya) at the Serravallian-Tortonian boundary (the Astaracian–Vallesian boundary in ELMA), and were unearthed between 2015 and 2018. The holotype GPIT/MA/10000 comprises a partial skeleton with elements of the mouth, vertebrae, and long bones. There are also three paratypes: an adult left femur (GPIT/MA/10001); an adult left femur, big toe, and teeth (GPIT/MA/10003); and juvenile teeth and a middle finger bone (GPIT/MA/10002). There are 37 specimens in total.

Hammerschmiede (Bavaria, Germany), the locality where Danuvius was discovered

Its tooth anatomy is most similar to that of other dryopithecine great apes. Having both adaptations for hanging in trees (suspensory locomotion) and standing on two legs (bipedalism), Danuvius may have been very similar in locomotory methods to the last common ancestor between humans and other apes, which adds weight to the hypothesis that ape suspensory activity and human bipedalism both originated from a form capable of both. However, it is too early to draw more definitive conclusions because it is unclear how Danuvius is related to modern great apes, including humans. Its discovery could also influence reconstructions of contemporary great ape limb anatomy and locomotion, which were previously by-and-large unknown.

== Description ==
Danuvius was small and probably weighed on average 23 kg (51 lb). The holotype specimen, an adult male, was calculated, based on the sizes of the hip and knee joints, to have weighed 26 to 37 kg (57 to 82 lb) with a point estimate of 31 kg (68 lb). The adult female specimen GPIT/MA/10003 was calculated to be 14 to 19 kg (31 to 42 lb) with a point estimate of 17 kg (37 lb), and the adult female GPIT/MA/10001 16 to 22 kg (35 to 49 lb) with a point estimate of 19 kg (42 lb). This is bigger than siamangs but much smaller than contemporary great apes; for example, male bonobos weigh 39 kg (86 lb) and females 31 kg (68 lb).

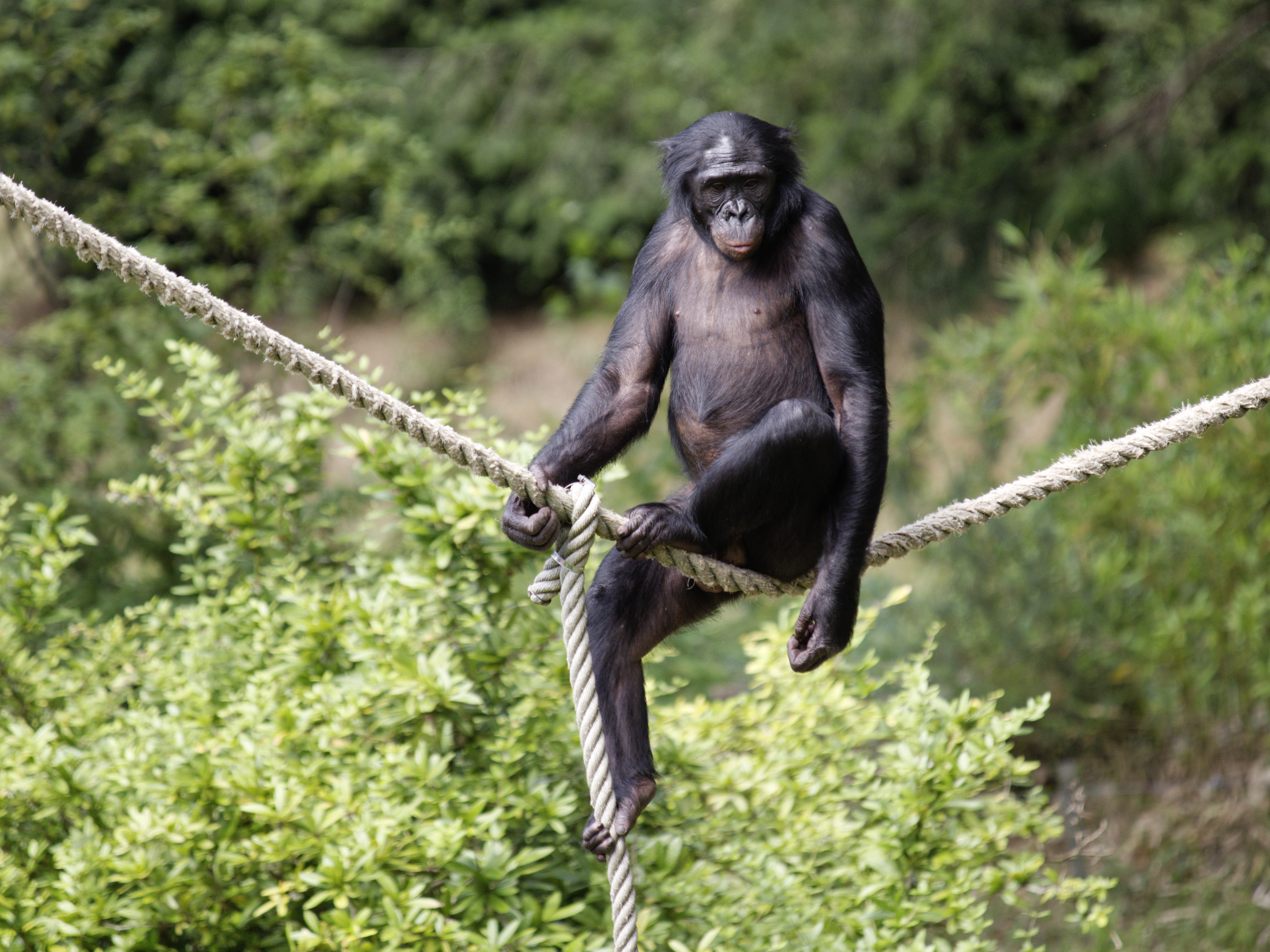
Danuvius limb proportions are most similar to those of bonobos.

The sex of the individuals was determined by the size of the canines, with males presumed to have had larger canines than females. Male dryopithecines are thought to have had an elongated face with the molars pushed more towards the front of the mouth. Like those of other dryopithecines, the molars of Danuvius were wide, and there was a broad length between the two cusps; however, the premolars had three roots instead of two, and the canines were more vertically oriented rather than somewhat sticking out.

Danuvius is thought to have had a broad chest. It is the first recorded Miocene great ape to have had the diaphragm located in the lower chest cavity, as in Homo, indicating an extended lower back and a greater number of functional lumbar vertebrae. This may have caused lordosis (the normal curvature of the human spine) and moved the center of mass over the hips and legs, which implies some habitual bipedal activity.

The robust finger and hypertrophied wrist and elbow bones indicate a strong grip and load bearing adaptations for the arms. The legs also show adaptations for load-bearing, especially at the hypertrophied knee joint. There was likely limited ankle loading, and the ankle would have had a hinge-like function, being most stable if positioned perpendicularly to the leg as opposed to at an angle in apes. Danuvius was likely able to achieve a strong grip with its big toes, unlike modern African great apes, which would have allowed it to grasp onto thinner trees. The limb proportions are most similar to those of bonobos.

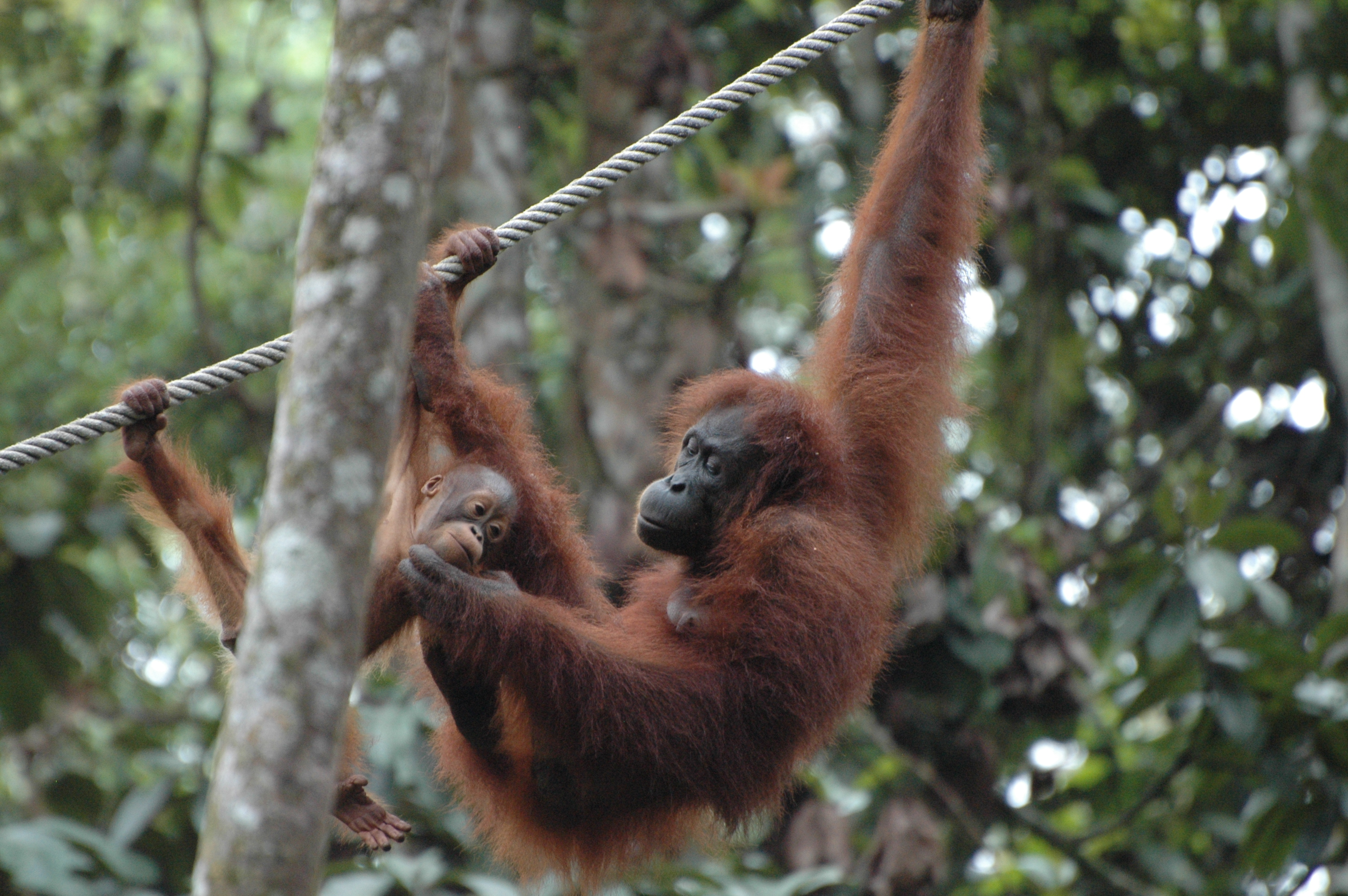
Orangutan suspensory behavior

Adaptations for load bearing in both the arm and leg joints to this degree is unknown in any other primate. Plantigrade catarrhine monkeys lack the capacity for suspensory locomotion or to focus body weight over the knee joint; knuckle-walking apes lack strong big toes and thumbs, and have more robust finger bones; and both lack an extendable knee. Orangutans have a clambering motion too, but their knees lack weight-bearing ability.

== Paleoecology ==
The total anatomy of the limbs suggest Danuvius was capable of a seemingly unique manner of locomotion called "extended limb clambering". Danuvius likely walked along mildly inclined tree branches with its foot directly laid onto the branch, using its strong big toes for grasping. The strong knee joint would have provided balance while walking by counteracting torques, and the strong hands would have carried out a similar function during suspension or palm-walking. Extended limb clambering emphasizes knee extension and lordosis, as well as the suspensory mechanisms seen in apes, and may be a precursor to obligate bipedalism seen in human ancestors.

Hammerschmiede has also yielded the remains of several small creatures such as molluscs, fish, and cold blooded vertebrates. Small mammals are the dominant fauna, such as rodents, rabbits, martens, hamsters, and shrews. However, large mammals are also known, such as the extinct mouse-deer Dorcatherium, the antelope Miotragocerus, and the rhinoceros Aceratherium. The site is located in the Upper Freshwater Molasse of the Molasse basin; by the late Miocene, the Paratethys Sea had dried up and the Alps had lifted, allowing the expansion of wetland habitats in the basin. The late Miocene may have been the beginning of a drying trend characterized by increased seasonality, causing deciduous forest to turn into a less dense woodland, and fruit and leaf production to occur cyclically rather than year-round. The late Miocene cooling trend may have led to the replacement of more tropical flora by mid-latitude and alpine varieties, and ultimately the extinction of European great apes.

== See also ==
- Ouranopithecus – Genus of extinct Eurasian great ape from the Miocene
- Dryopithecus – Extinct great ape from Europe
- Anoiapithecus – Extinct genus of ape from the Miocene
- Rudapithecus – Miocene genus of great ape from Europe
- Hispanopithecus – Genus of apes from Miocene Europe
- Pierolapithecus – Extinct species of ape from Miocene Europe
- Oreopithecus – Extinct genus of hominid from the Miocene
