= Eurolagus =

Eurolagus Temporal range: Miocene

Scientific classification
- Kingdom: Animalia
- Phylum: Chordata
- Class: Mammalia
- Infraclass: Placentalia
- Order: Lagomorpha
- Family: †Palaeolagidae
- Genus: †Eurolagus
- Species: †E. fontanessi

Binomial name
- †Eurolagus fontanessi Depéret, 1887

Extinct genus of lagomorph

Eurolagus is an extinct genus of palaeolagid lagomorph that lived in Europe during the Miocene epoch.

== Palaeoecology ==
The dental microwear of Eurolagus fontanessi from the site of Bełchatów A in Poland, which dates back to MN 9, suggests that E. fontanessi was a mixed feeder that lived in sylvan environments.
