= Ramshorn snail =

Common name for several species of snail

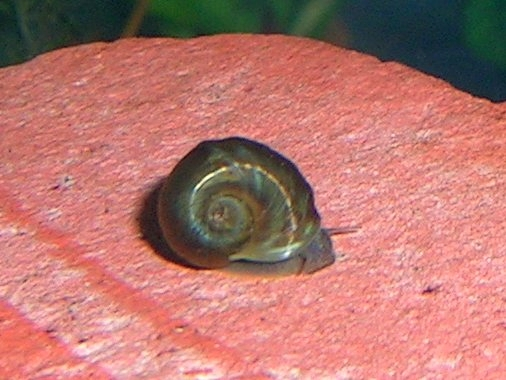
An aquarium ramshorn snail

The term ramshorn snail or ram's horn snail is used in two different ways. In the aquarium trade, it is used to describe various kinds of freshwater snails whose shells are planispiral, meaning that the shell is a flat coil. Such shells resemble a coil of rope, or (as the name suggests) a ram's horn. In a more general natural history context, the term "ramshorn snails" is used more precisely to mean those aquatic pulmonate gastropod mollusks in the family Planorbidae that have planispiral coiled shells.

Ramshorn snails have been bred for the aquarium trade and various color forms have been selected. The two species commonly found in aquariums are Planorbella duryi and Planorbarius corneus, both in the family Planorbidae. One species (Columbia ramshorn, Marisa cornuarietis) is from a totally different family, the Ampullariidae.

Ramshorn snails can sometimes become a nuisance in an aquarium where they have access to an unlimited food supply. However, in properly managed aquaria that are free of excess detritus, they are rarely prolific enough to become a nuisance to the home aquarist.

== Description ==
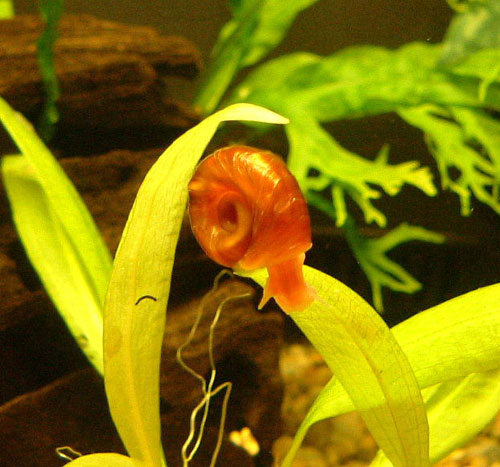
Red ramshorn snail

Most of these snails are of the family Planorbidae. There are two different coloured skin forms: black and red; the latter lack the dark skin pigment melanin and consequently have a bright reddish skin, which is the colour of their blood. Their blood contains red hemoglobin, unlike other snails' blood, which contains greenish hemocyanin.

These ramshorn snails breathe air. Although most of them are tiny, some may reach a size of two and a half centimeters (one inch). The shells range from translucent through various shades of brown to a dark, nearly black color. The dark color appears to originate from dietary materials not generally available in the home aquarium, although many varieties from ponds are this dark shade.

Snails of this family are spiralled sinistrally, with the opening hole slanted downward toward the right. Large folds of skin may protrude out of the more open left side. Like all air-breathing water snails, the animal has no operculum, and has only one pair of tentacles with the eye spots at the base of the tentacles. Ramshorn snails have a lifespan of one year.

=== Breeding ===
Ramshorn snails deposit their eggs in small, brownish clusters, typically containing ten to twelve eggs, although the exact number can vary between individuals. These clusters are translucent, allowing the developing snails inside to be observed. The eggs usually hatch within two to five weeks, with warmer water temperatures generally shortening the incubation period. Newly hatched snails are pale white and gradually develop their pigmentation over the following weeks.

Ramshorn snails are simultaneous hermaphrodites, meaning each individual possesses both male and female reproductive organs and any two snails can mate. During mating, two snails remain joined for 30 minutes to several hours. Notably, individuals can store sperm for several weeks following a mating event, which means a single snail introduced to a new tank may produce eggs even in isolation.

== Breeding Rate / Reproductive Speed ==
A healthy adult can deposit multiple clutches per week under favorable conditions, and juveniles reach sexual maturity at approximately 4–6 weeks of age. This rapid generation time contributes to the exponential population growth observed in food-rich aquarium environments.

== Interaction with environment ==
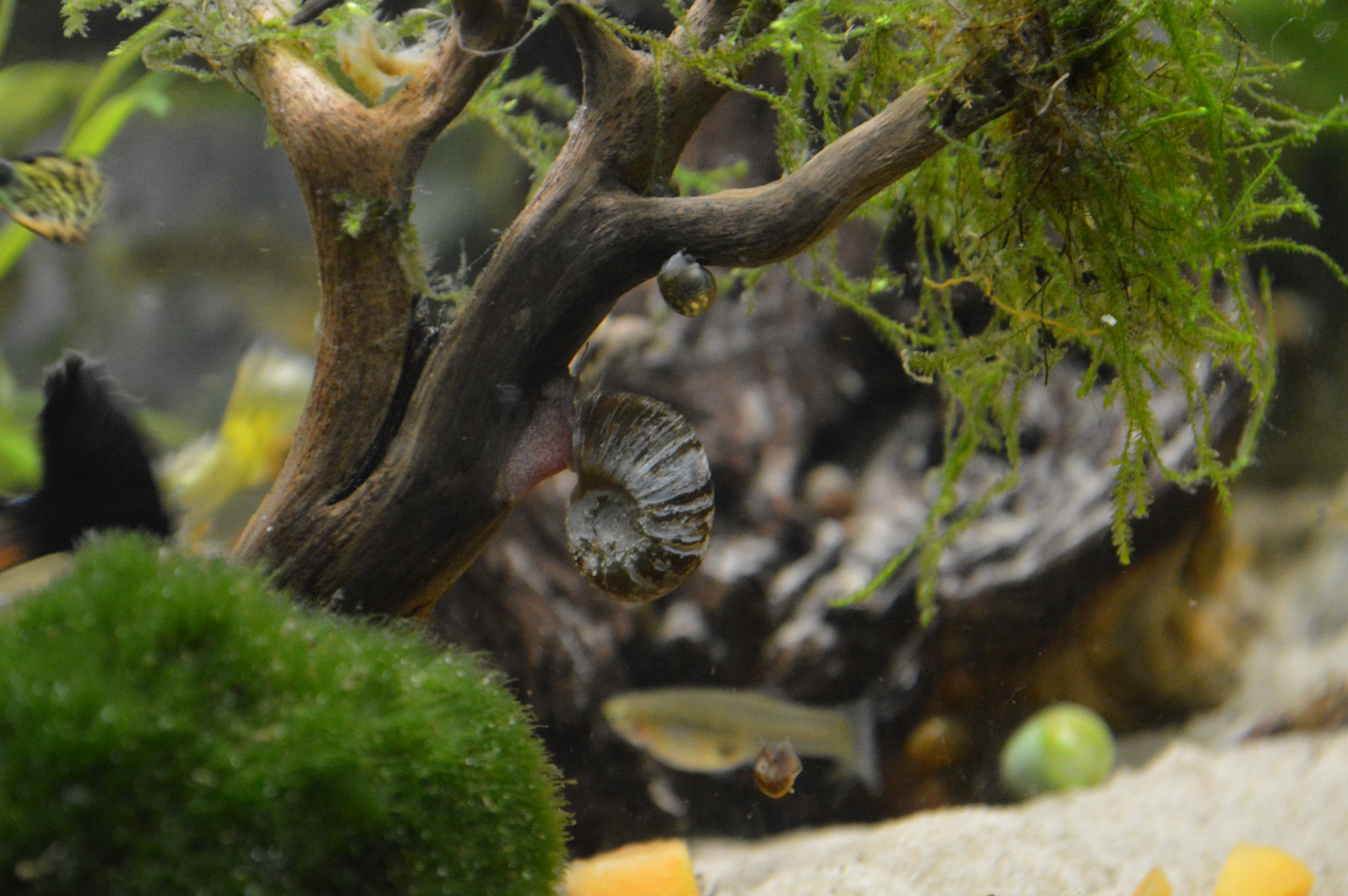
Ramshorn snail with calcium deficiency.

Ramshorn snails generally will eat only the most delicate plants, preferring algae, uneaten fish food, and dead fish. Some varieties do particularly enjoy eating the leaves of stem plants such as cabomba and anacharis.

Some aquarium species will eat ramshorn snails. More voracious eaters include puffers, loaches (such as the clown loach or any other member of the genus Botia), crayfish, and most gouramis— though many other fish will also consume snail meat. Apple snails and assassin snails will also prey upon ramshorn snails.

Good fish roommates for snails include, but are not limited to, danios, guppies, White Cloud Mountain minnows, neon tetras, and cory catfish. All of these are non-aggressive fish that cohabit easily with snails.

One should also be aware that pond-reared red ramshorn snails are able to carry various parasitic flukes, which can be transmitted to fish, or humans. Most of these flukes require intermediate hosts, so that leaving the snails in a fish-free aquarium for a month or so will eliminate any parasites.

If the population is kept to a manageable size, ramshorn snails can be good tank cleaners. They eat algae and dead or dying plants generally, so they can be useful. However, if they breed too prolifically, they can become a nuisance. In warm climates (such as those in mainland Australia or the southern United States), they much prefer ponds, especially outdoor ponds. Algae, dead leaves that sink to the bottom, mulm and dead animals can be a problem, as they foul the water. Ramshorn snails eat all of these things.

== Role as aquarium pest ==
Most ramshorn snails are considered minor aquarium pests. They may arrive in a tank as egg bundles hidden in newly acquired plants. Although their red color may make them somewhat interesting aquarium subjects, their hermaphroditic ability to breed prolifically from any two specimens can make them troublesome. If the aquarium isn't over fed then the snail population will be kept in check naturally.

Manual methods include baiting the snails with lettuce (run it under hot water first and leave overnight), cucumber slices, or food pellets. These may be left out in the open, and removed with their snails, or kept in some container, such as a film canister weighed down with a pebble, and containing holes drilled in it.

Introducing animals to control a snail population can require some thought. Other aquarium fish may not be compatible, and some larger adult snails may be too big to be eaten by smaller snail-eating species. Snail eating species also do not usually discriminate between different types of snails, although this is usually not much of a concern.

Snail poisons are generally considered to be a last resort, as most of them are copper-based and are potentially toxic to plants and fish and particularly dangerous to other invertebrates. Even new safer chemicals that do not harm the other aquarium inhabitants may cause damage if large numbers of dead snails are allowed to decompose. For this reason, it is best to prevent over population by avoiding overfeeding of the tank.

Incubation time is strongly influenced by water temperature. At 20–22°C (68–72°F), eggs typically hatch in 18–24 days; at 25–27°C (77–80°F), hatching occurs in approximately 10–12 days; and at 27–29°C (81–84°F), hatching can occur in as few as 7–9 days.

== "Giant ramshorn" snails ==
Totally unrelated to these ramshorn snails is the species Marisa cornuarietis, which is often sold at pet stores under the name "Columbian ramshorn" or "giant ramshorn" snail. This species is actually a kind of apple snail, albeit one with a planispiral shell. They are distinguished by having an operculum by which they can close themselves into their shell, two pairs of tentacles, separate genders, and a siphon on the left side.

Its shell is yellowish, with brown stripes running the length of the shell. These apple snails lay gelatinous masses of eggs on submerged portions of plants. They can grow to up to four centimeters in size. They generally will not become a pest, although they can consume large amounts of plant matter. They are very large compared to other Ramshorn snails.
