= Madelaine Böhme =

German palaeontologist

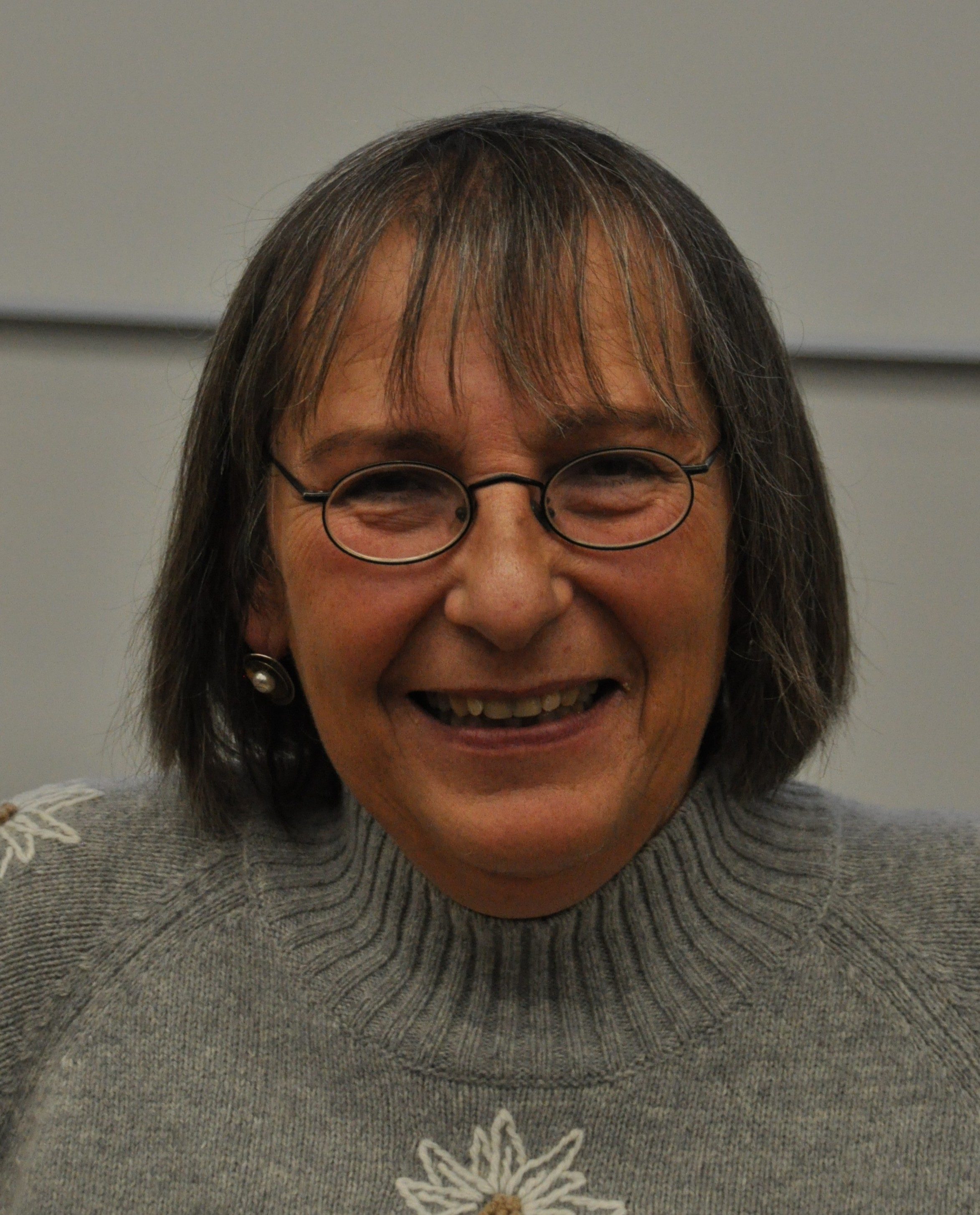
- Madelaine Böhme in 2026
- Born: 1967 (age 58–59); Plovdiv, Bulgaria

Academic background
- Education: Freiberg University of Mining and Technology
- Alma mater: Leipzig University

Academic work
- Discipline: Palaeontologist
- Sub-discipline: Palaeoclimatology
- Institutions: University of Tübingen

Madelaine Böhme (born 1967) is a German palaeontologist and professor of palaeoclimatology at the University of Tübingen.

== Life ==
Böhme was born in 1967 in Plovdiv, Bulgaria. She studied at the Freiberg University of Mining and Technology and Leipzig University, completing her doctorate in paeleontology there in 1997 and habilitation in geology and palaeontology at LMU Munich in 2003. In 2009, she became professor of terrestrial palaeoclimatology in Tübingen.

== Scientific discoveries ==
Work published in 2017 by a team including Böhme established that Graecopithecus freybergi fossils found in Greece were 7.2 million years old, and hypothesized that the species was maybe hominin.

In 2019, Böhme and her team were the first to describe Danuvius guggenmosi, an extinct species of great apes with adaptations for bipedalism that lived 11.6 million years ago.

In 2022, alongside Gerald Mayr and Thomas Lechner, Böhme described Allgoviachen tortonica, a new genus and species of anatid bird from the Hammerschmiede clay pits of Bavaria, Germany.

Below is a list of taxa that Böhme has contributed to naming:

Year	Taxon	Authors
2022	Allgoviachen tortonica gen. et sp. nov.	Mayr, Lechner, & Böhme
2021	Maomingosuchus acutirostris sp. nov.	Massonne, Augustin, Matzke, Weber, & Böhme
2019	Orientalosuchus naduongensis gen. et sp. nov.	Massonne, Vasilyan, Rabi, & Böhme
2019	Banhxeochelys trani gen. et sp. nov.	Garbin, Böhme, & Joyce
2019	Danuvius guggenmosi gen. et sp. nov.	Böhme, Spassov, Fuss, Tröscher, Deane, Prieto, Kirscher, Lechner, & Begun
2018	Varanus mokrensis sp. nov.	Ivanov, Ruta, Klembara, & Böhme
