= Spermophilinus =

Spermophilinus Temporal range: Neogene

Scientific classification
- Kingdom: Animalia
- Phylum: Chordata
- Class: Mammalia
- Order: Rodentia
- Family: Sciuridae
- Subfamily: Xerinae
- Genus: †Spermophilinus; De Brujin & Mein, 1968

Type species
- Spermophilinus bredai Von Meyer, 1848

Other species
- Spermophilinus beasnus Spermophilinus giganteus Spermophilinus turolensis

Extinct genus of rodents

Spermophilinus is an extinct genus of xerine sciurid that lived during the Neogene period.

== Palaeoecology ==
Dental microwear of S. bredai fossils at the Tortonian site of Grytsiv in Ukraine shows that this species ate hard fruits and seeds, with little evidence of grass consumption.
