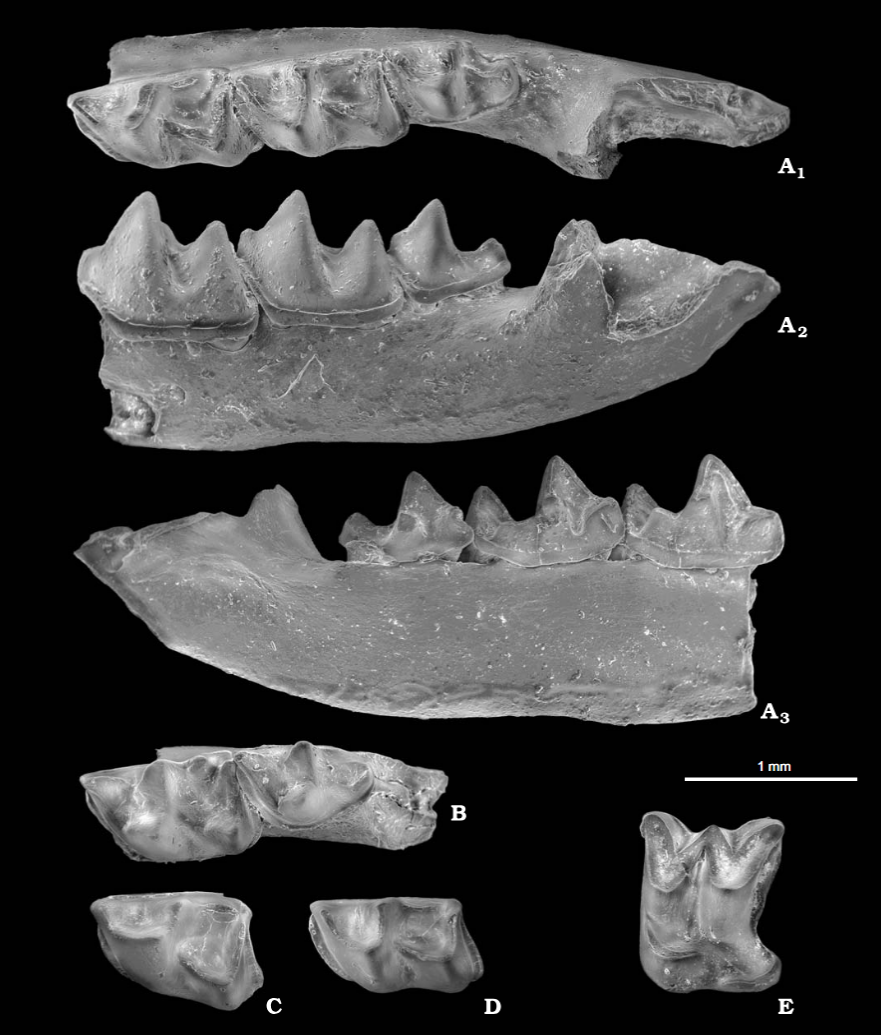
- Paenelimnoecus truyolsi mandible from the middle Miocene of Spain

Scientific classification
- Kingdom: Animalia
- Phylum: Chordata
- Class: Mammalia
- Order: Eulipotyphla
- Family: Soricidae
- Genus: †Paenelimnoecus; Baudelot, 1972

Species
- †Paenelimnoecus micromorphus; †Paenelimnoecus truyolsi; †Paenelimnoecus crouzeli; †Paenelimnoecus obtusus; †Paenelimnoecus chinensis; †Paenelimnoecus repenningi; †Paenelimnoecus pannonica

= Paenelimnoecus =

Paenelimnoecus Temporal range: Miocene

Genus of Miocene shrew

Paenelimnoecus is an extinct genus of allosoricin shrew from the Miocene epoch. At present, its fossil range is restricted to Eurasia. It has a complicated taxonomic history and it is uncertain exactly which species belong to it. Its higher classification is also tentative.
