= Dinosorex =

Scientific classification
- Domain: Eukaryota
- Kingdom: Animalia
- Phylum: Chordata
- Class: Mammalia
- Order: Eulipotyphla
- Family: †Heterosoricidae
- Genus: †Dinosorex; Engesser, 1972

Extinct genus of mammals

Dinosorex is an extinct eulipotyphlan genus, popularly referred to as giant terror shrews due to their fearsome lower incisors. Dinosorex lived in Europe from the late Oligocene or early Miocene to the late Miocene, with a range that stretched from Ukraine to Iberia. It was about the size of a modern hedgehog, but its enlarged and strengthened incisors (which have been found to contain iron particles within the enamel) may have allowed it to adopt a partially carnivorous diet, as opposed to the strictly insectivorous diet of most modern mammals of that size.

== Taxonomy ==
The genus was described in 1972 by B. Engesser. It comprises the following species:

- D. anatolicus
- D. engesseri
- D. huerzeleri
- D. pachygnathus
- D. sansaniensis
- D. zapfei
