= Pforzen =

- Municipality
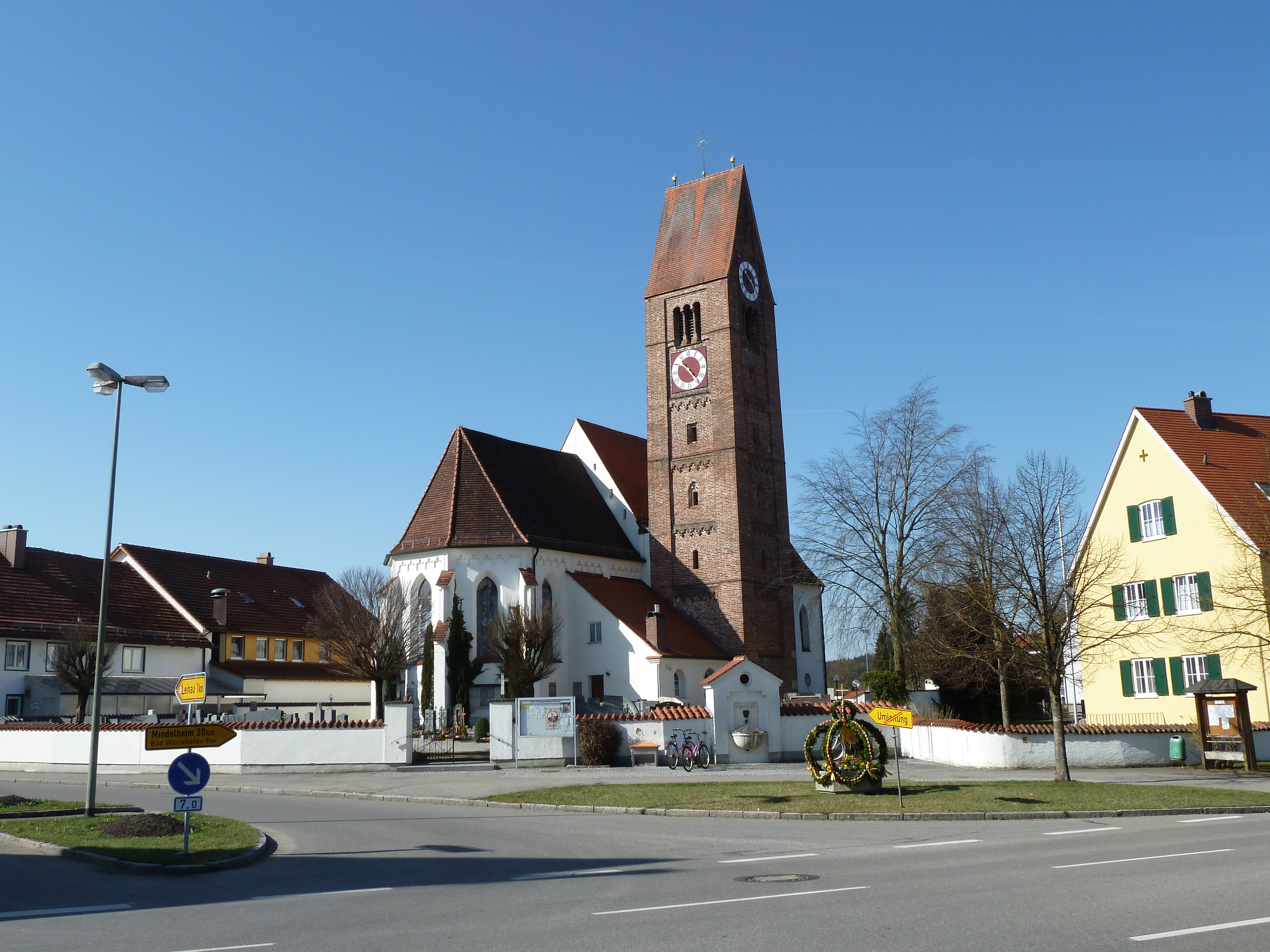
- Church of Saint Valentine

- Coat of arms

- Location of Pforzen within Ostallgäu district
- Interactive map of Pforzen
- Location within Germany Location within Bavaria
- Coordinates: 47°56′N 10°37′E
- Country: Germany
- State: Bavaria
- Admin. region: Schwaben
- District: Ostallgäu
- Municipal assoc.: Pforzen

Government
  - Mayor (2020–26): Herbert Hofer

Area
  - Total: 23.69 km^{2} (9.15 sq mi)
- Elevation: 656 m (2,152 ft)

Population (2025-12-31)
  - Total: 2,429
  - Density: 102.5/km^{2} (265.6/sq mi)
- Time zone: UTC+01:00 (CET)
  - Summer (DST): UTC+02:00 (CEST)
- Postal codes: 87666
- Dialling codes: 08346
- Vehicle registration: OAL
- Website: www.pforzen.de

Pforzen (German pronunciation: [ˈpfɔʁtsn̩]) is a municipality in Ostallgäu, Bavaria.

== Cemetery ==
Near Pforzen is an extended Alemannic cemetery that was in use from the 5th up to the 8th century. A total of 442 graves were excavated in two campaigns in 1991/2 and 1996. Two items bearing runic inscriptions were recovered, the Pforzen buckle in 1992 and an ivory ring in 1996.

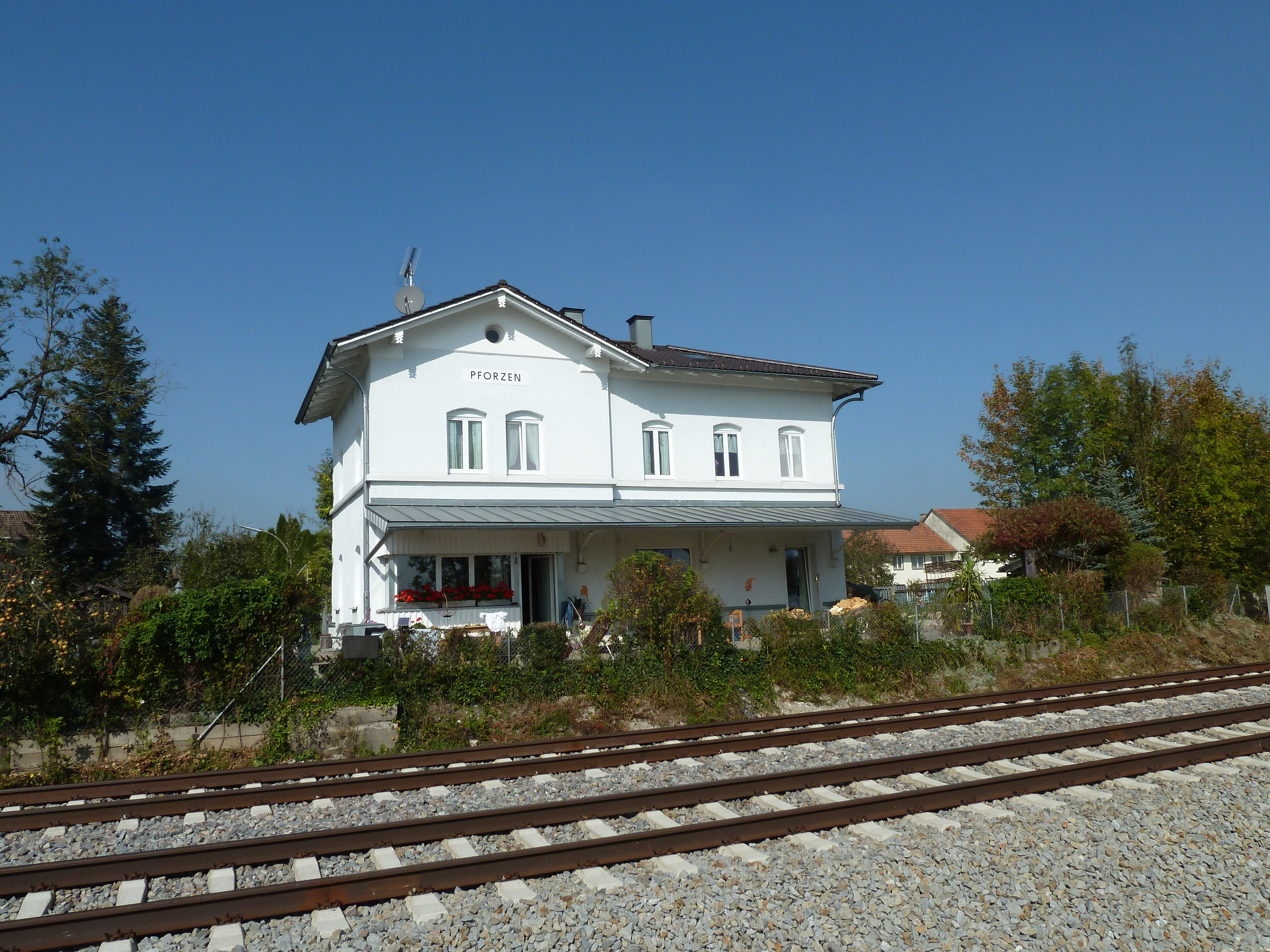
Former train station in Pforzen
