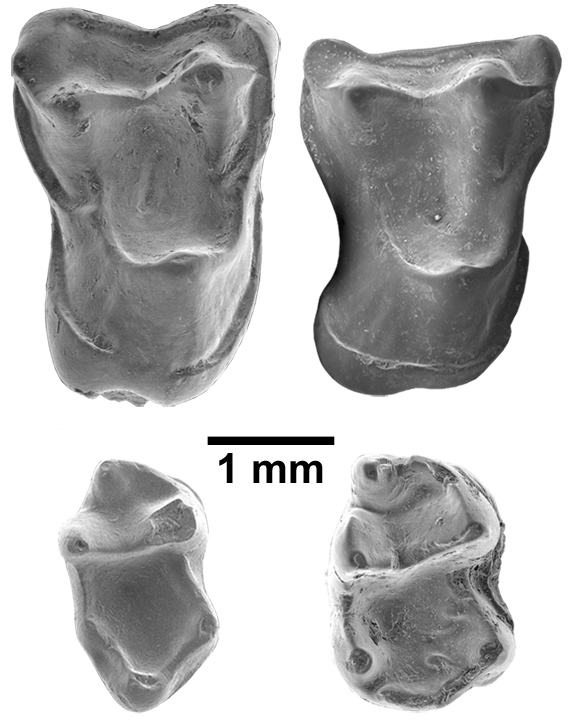
- Four isolated teeth of Afrasia djijidae. Clockwise from top left: right second upper molar (M2), right first upper molar (M1), right lower second molar (m2), and right lower third molar (m3).

Scientific classification
- Kingdom: Animalia
- Phylum: Chordata
- Class: Mammalia
- Order: Primates
- Family: †Afrotarsiidae
- Genus: †Afrasia; Chaimanee et al. 2012
- Species: †A. djijidae

Binomial name
- †Afrasia djijidae Chaimanee et al. 2012

= Afrasia djijidae =

Afrasia djijidae Temporal range: 40 Ma Late Middle Eocene

Eocene fossil primate from Myanmar

Afrasia djijidae is a fossil primate that lived in Myanmar approximately 37 million years ago, during the late middle Eocene. The only species in the genus Afrasia, it was a small primate, estimated to weigh around 100 grams (3.5 oz). Despite the significant geographic distance between them, Afrasia is thought to be closely related to Afrotarsius, an enigmatic fossil found in Libya and Egypt; the Libyan fossils date to 38–39 million years ago. If this relationship is correct, it suggests that early simians (a related group or clade consisting of monkeys, apes, and humans) dispersed from Asia to Africa during the middle Eocene and would add further support to the hypothesis that the first simians evolved in Asia, not Africa. Neither Afrasia nor Afrotarsius, which together form the family Afrotarsiidae, is considered ancestral to living simians, but they are part of a side branch or stem group known as eosimiiforms. Because they did not give rise to the stem simians that are known from the same deposits in Africa, early Asian simians are thought to have dispersed from Asia to Africa more than once prior to the late middle Eocene. Such dispersals from Asia to Africa also were seen around the same time in other mammalian groups, including hystricognathous rodents and anthracotheres.

Afrasia is known from four isolated molar teeth found in the Pondaung Formation of Myanmar. These teeth are similar to those of Afrotarsius and Eosimiidae, and differ only in details of the chewing surface. For example, the back part of the third lower molar is relatively well-developed. In the Pondaung Formation, Afrasia was part of a diverse primate community that also includes the eosimiid Bahinia and members of the families Amphipithecidae and Sivaladapidae.

== Etymology ==
The name Afrasia derives from the continental names "Africa" and "Asia", and refers to the occurrence of eosimiiform primates on both continents. The species, A. djijidae, was named in memory of a young girl from Mogaung village in central Myanmar.

== Evolutionary history ==
Phylogeny of Paleogene simians

- Primates
  - Strepsirrhini (†adapiforms, lemurs, & lorisoids)
  - Haplorhini
    - †Omomyidae + Tarsiidae (tarsiers)
    - - †Eosimiiformes
        - †Afrotarsiidae
          - †Afrasia djijidae
          - †Afrotarsius libycus
        - †Eosimiidae
          - †Bahinia
          - - †Eosimias
            - †Phenacopithecus
      - - - †Parapithecidae
          - †Proteopithecidae
        - - Platyrrhini (New World monkeys)
          - - †Amphipithecidae
            - - †Oligopithecidae
              - †Propliopithecidae

According to Chaimanee et al. 2012, the close relationship between Afrasia djijidae from Southeast Asia and Afrotarsius libycus from North Africa demonstrates one of at least two dispersals of stem simians from Asia to Africa during the middle Eocene.

Afrasia djijidae was first described in 2012 on the basis of isolated teeth from the 37-million-year-old Pondaung Formation, at a locality near the village of Nyaungpinle in Myanmar. Prior to the discovery of A. djijidae, early Asian simians were typically classified in two families, Eosimiidae and Amphipithecidae. While eosimiids are generally considered the most basal simian clade (a stem group of simians), the phylogenetic placement of amphipithecids is more disputed. Amphipithecids are usually considered to share affinities with either eosimiids or crown simians (those simians that are part of the smallest clade that contains the living simians); the latter view is favored.

Eosimiids were first described from findings in China in 1994 and are still best known there (two genera are now known, Eosimias and Phenacopithecus), but have also been recorded in Pakistan (Phileosimias) and Myanmar (Bahinia). All species had a small body size and a mix of primitive (ancestral) and derived traits. Bahinia, which is larger than the known Chinese eosimiids, is from the Pondaung Formation, the same stratum as Afrasia, and the morphology of its molars bridges the gap between the more primitive molars of Eosimias and the more derived molars of the later Eocene African simians. Afrasia, on the other hand, is more comparable in size to the eosimiids from China.

The upper molars of Afrasia are nearly identical in morphology and size to those of Afrotarsius, an animal known from 38- to 39-million-year-old deposits in Libya (species Afrotarsius libycus) and about 30-million-year-old deposits in Egypt (A. chatrathi). Afrotarsius was originally described as a tarsier, but later suggested to be related to primitive simians. Because of their close similarities, Afrasia and Afrotarsius are together placed in the family Afrotarsiidae. A phylogenetic analysis placed Afrasia as a sister group to Afrotarsius, forming the family Afrotarsiidae. Afrotarsiidae was found to be most closely related to Eosimiidae, and unrelated to tarsiers. The clade formed by Afrotarsiidae and Eosimiidae was designated as the infraorder Eosimiiformes by Chaimanee et al. in 2012. Eosimiiformes are the sister group of all other simians, living and fossil. However, the classification of Afrotarsius as a stem simian is not accepted by all researchers, and the phylogenetic claims and their implications rest on only the four molars of Afrasia initially discovered.

=== Biogeography ===
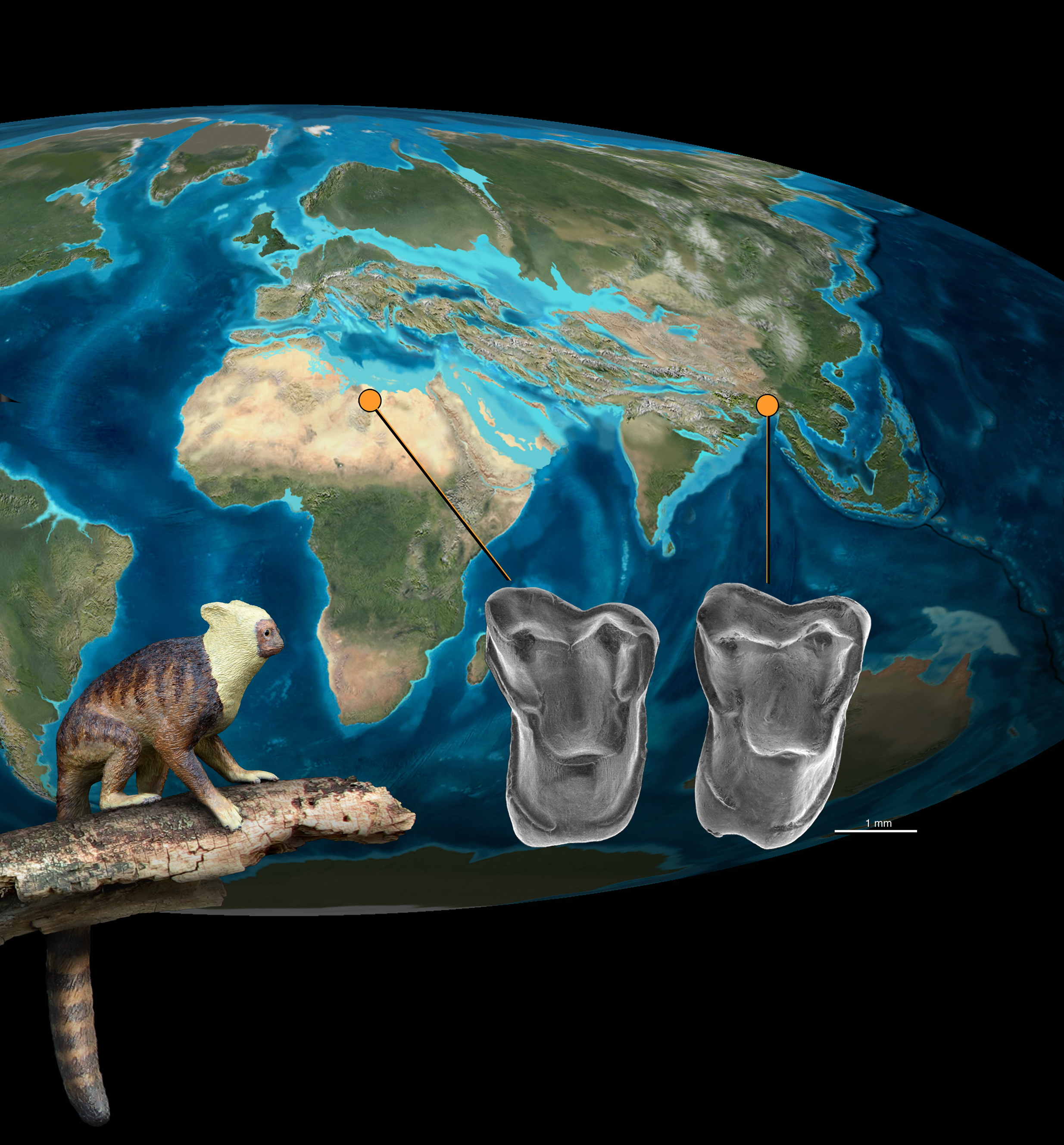
Afrasia from Asia and Afrotarsius from Africa exhibit similar morphology of their teeth and lived in the late middle Eocene, suggesting stem simians dispersed from Asia to Africa around that time.

Several hypotheses compete to explain the geographic origins of simians. Of the two most popular views, one hypothesis states that simians originated in Asia, while the other favors Africa as their place of origin. Both their ancient origins and the sparse fossil record in Africa and Asia complicate the debate. Convergent evolution also makes it difficult for researchers to determine the relationships between fossils. Also, the earliest fossils, which do not match up with molecular clock estimates for simian origins, have been found in both Afro-Arabia and Asia. At the time, both landmasses would have been separated by the Tethys Sea.

The oldest undisputed simians from Africa also date to the late middle Eocene. Afrotarsius was found in the Dur At-Talah escarpment in Libya, which dates to 38–39 million years ago and also contains the parapithecid Biretia and the oligopithecid Talahpithecus. Although diverse, these primates were all very small in size, much like eosimiids. Simian classification for older fossils from Africa are more contested. Altiatlasius, a fossil primate from the late Paleocene of Morocco, is too fragmentary to ascertain its true affinities. Algeripithecus was popularly considered an early middle Eocene simian; however, less fragmentary remains uncovered between 2003 and 2009 suggest it was a type of azibiid, a group of strepsirrhine primates likely related to lemuriform primates (lemurs and lorisoids).

According to the team who discovered Afrasia, headed by Jean-Jacques Jaeger, the similarities in tooth morphology, body size, and age suggest a phylogenetic relationship with Afrotarsius despite the geographic separation. They suggested that afrotarsiid simians from Asia dispersed across the Tethys Sea to Africa around the middle Eocene, giving rise to Afrotarsius. A reverse migration—as suggested by the hypothesis of the African origin for simians—is not favored due to the close phylogenetic relationship between the older Asian eosimiids and Afrasia. However, to explain the origins of Proteopithecidae, Parapithecidae, and crown simians from the African fossil record, a higher simian clade also needed to disperse from Asia to Africa before the late middle Eocene since neither Afrasia nor Afrotarsius could have given rise to this group. Such dispersals from Asia to Africa were not uncommon, since hystricognathous rodents, anthracotheres, and possibly other mammalian fauna from Asia arrived around the same time.

== Anatomy ==
Afrasia is known from four isolated teeth: a first upper molar (M1), with a length of 2.13 mm and width of 3.06 mm; a second upper molar (M2), the holotype, of 2.27 mm by 3.35 mm; a second lower molar (m2) of 2.09 mm by 1.41 mm; and a third lower molar (m3) of 2.05 mm by 1.27 mm. Like other eosimiiforms, it was a small primate that weighed around 108 or 94 g (3.8 or 3.3 oz), which is estimated based on the measurements of its M2 and M1, respectively. It is generally similar to other eosimiiforms in general and Afrotarsius in particular; some distinguishing features are the well-developed small cusps (conules) on the upper molars, the variable development of the lingual cingulum (a shelf on the inner, or lingual, side of the tooth) of the upper molars, and the unreduced talonid (posterior portion) on the m3. Its teeth are smaller than those of the eosimiids Phenacopithecus, Bahinia, and Phileosimias.

The M2 is similar to that of eosimiids and almost identical to that of Afrotarsius libycus. It shows well-developed small accessory cusps (the paraconule and metaconule) that are connected to equally well-developed crests. The conules are stronger than in Eosimias and Bahinia, but weaker than in Phileosimias. The stylar shelf, the outer area of the tooth, is broad, particularly at the metacone cusp. However, the shelf is better developed near the paracone cusp in Afrasia than in Afrotarsius, which makes the ectoflexus (an invagination in the outer wall of the tooth) more symmetrical in the former. The parastyle, a small cusp in the outer front corner of the tooth, is located more buccally (towards the outer side of the tooth) than in Afrotarsius and is larger. The stylar shelf is larger than that of Bahinia and Phileosimias, but smaller than that of Eosimias. The parastyle is also less developed than in Eosimias, but the protocone, the main cusp on the lingual side of the tooth, is more expansive. The lingual cingulum is incomplete; it is stronger in Phenacopithecus.

M1 is similar to M2, but somewhat smaller. The ectoflexus is less apparent, the stylar shelf is narrower, there is no crest behind the metaconule, and the lingual cingulum is continuous. The condition of the parastyle more closely resembles that in Afrotarsius.

In m2, the trigonid (the front portion of the tooth) consists of three very distinct cusps: the paraconid at the front, and behind it the paired protoconid (on the buccal side) and metaconid (on the lingual side). These three cusps are less discrete in Afrotarsius. The paraconid is distinct from the paracristid, the crest that connects it to the protoconid, and is located more lingually than in Afrotarsius. Between this cusp and the metaconid behind it, the central basin of the trigonid is open towards the lingual margin of the tooth. The protocristid is transversely oriented and V-shaped in profile. The back portion of the tooth, the talonid, is broader; Eosimias has a narrower talonid. The main cusps, the buccal hypoconid and lingual entoconid, are opposite each other on the margins of the tooth (the entoconid is further to the front in Phenacopithecus). A crest, the cristid obliqua, connects the front side of the hypoconid to the protoconid. It is less obliquely oriented than in Eosimias and Phenacopithecus. A crest, the postcristid, descends from the hypoconid along the back margin of the tooth and almost reaches the entoconid, which is separated by a notch. It incorporates the third talonid cusp, the hypoconulid, which is indistinct in Afrasia. In Afrotarsius and eosimiids (except the Pakistani Phileosimias), this crest reaches the entoconid. There is a cingulum, or shelf, on the buccal side of m2.

The last lower molar, m3, is smaller and has a longer talonid, with a well-developed hypoconulid lobe at the back, and generally resembles that of Phenacopithecus, but the trigonid is smaller. The paraconid is distinct. The hypoconulid lobe is longer than in Afrotarsius and the entoconid is located further to the front. Unlike on m2, there is no notch between the hypoconulid and entoconid, though a valley is present.

== Range and ecology ==
Afrasia has only been found in the Eocene Pondaung Formation of central Myanmar, a rock unit dated to about 40 million years ago. Although several tons of sediments in the area have been screened for fossils, Afrasia is still known only from four teeth, suggesting that it was a rare species.

Since fossils were first discovered there in 1916, a rich fossil fauna has been recovered in the Pondaung Formation. In addition to Afrasia, primates found there include the eosimiid Bahinia; the amphipithecids Pondaungia, Ganlea, and Myanmarpithecus; and the sivaladapids Paukkaungia and Kyitchaungia.
