= Pondaung Formation =

Geologic formation in Myanmar

- Stratigraphic range: Middle Eocene
- Type: Formation
- Underlies: Yaw Formation
- Overlies: Tabyin Formation
- Thickness: Up to 2 km 500 m (part with terrestrial fossils)

Location
- Country: Myanmar

The Pondaung Formation (Burmese: ပုံတောင်ကျောက်လွှာစု) is a geologic formation in central Myanmar. The Pondaung Formation has been dated to the late middle Eocene, about 40 million years ago. The formation preserves a rich fauna of fossil mammals, the so-called Pondaung fauna, and is especially well known for its fossil anthracotheres and primates. The paleoenvironment was a warm and forested terrestrial inland habitat, with several river channels. Local habitats varied from dense forests to more open-forested wetlands.

== Mammal fossils ==
=== Artiodactyls ===
==== Agriochoerids ====
Genus/family	Species	Notes/affinities	Image
Agriochoeridae	Gen et sp. nov.	Undescribed new species and genus	
Agriochoeridae	cf. gen et sp. nov.	Undescribed new species and genus	

==== Anthracotheres ====
The anthracotheres of the Pondaung Formation have been revised several times. Tsubamoto et al. (2000) recognized the three genera Anthracohyus, Anthracothema, and Anthracokeryx, and twelve species. The list here mostly follows the more recent 2008 revision by Aung N. Soe (adding species described later), which recognized eight species, in the genera Anthracohyus, Anthracotherium, Anthracokeryx, and Siamotherium.

Genus/family	Species	Notes/affinities	Image
Anthracohyus	A. choeroides		
Anthracotherium	A. crassum		
Anthracotherium	A. magnum		
Anthracotherium	A. pangan		
Anthracokeryx	A. birmanicum		
Anthracokeryx	A. tenuis		
Myaingtherium	M. kenyapotamoides		
Siamotherium	S. krabiense		
Siamotherium	S. pondaugnensis		

==== Helohyids ====
Genus/family	Species	Notes/affinities	Image
Pakkohyus	P. lahirii	An helohyid	

==== Ruminants ====
Genus/family	Species	Notes/affinities	Image
Indomeryx	I. arenae		
Indomeryx	I. cotteri		

==== Unplaced ====
Genus/family	Species	Notes/affinities	Image
Myanmarius	M. chitseini	The upper molars suggest raoellid affinity. If excluded, the other fossils suggest closer relations to suoids.	

=== Hyaenodonts ===
Genus/family	Species	Notes/affinities	Image
Kyawdawia	K. lupina	A hyainailourid	
Yarshea	Y. cruenta	A hyainailourid	
Orienspterodon	O. dahkoensis	A hyainailourid	

=== Perissodactyls ===
==== Brontotheres ====
Genus/family	Species	Notes/affinities	Image
Bunobrontops	B. savagei	A primitive brontothere	
"Metatelmatherium"	"M". brownii	Does not belong to Metatelmatherium	
"Metatelmatherium"	"M". lahirii	Does not belong to Metatelmatherium	
Sivatitanops	S. cotteri	Dubious	
Sivatitanops	S. birmanicum	Dubious	
Sivatitanops	S.? rugosidens	Dubious	
cf. Palaeosyops	cf. P. sp.	A primitive brontothere; previously described as Bunobrontops sp.	

==== Chalicotherioids ====
Genus/family	Species	Notes/affinities	Image
Eomoropus	E. cf. minimus	An eomoropid	
Eomoropus	E. pawnyunti		
Eomoropidae	Eomoropidae gen. et sp. indet.	An eomoropid	

==== Rhinocerotoids ====
Genus/family	Species	Notes/affinities	Image
cf Ilianodon	cf. I. lunanensis	A hyracodont	
Paramynodon	P. birmanicus	An amynodont. A second species, P. cotteri, was previously recognized but is now considered a synonym of P. birmanicus.	

==== Tapiroids ====
Genus/family	Species	Notes/affinities	Image
Bahinolophus	B. birmanicus	A deperetellid. Previously treated under the name Deperetella birmanicum	
Indolophus	I. guptai		

==== Unplaced ====
Genus/family	Species	Notes/affinities	Image
Hsanotherium	H. parvum	Originally classified as an anthracobunid, perhaps closer to artiodactyls	
Skopailophus	S. burmese	A basal tapiromorph	

=== Primates ===
Genus/family	Species	Notes/affinities	Image
Afrasia	A. djijidae	A primitive anthropoid	
Amphipithecus	A. mogaungensis	An amphipithecid	
Bahinia	B. pondaungensis	An eosimiid	
Eosimias?	E.? pakaungensis	An eosimiid	
Ganlea	G. megacanina	An amphipithecid	
Guangxilemur	G. rarissimus	An sivaladapid	
Kyitchaungia	K. takaii	A sivaladapid	
Myanmarpithecus	M. yarshensis	A primitive anthropoid	
Paukkaungia	P. parva	A sivaladapid	
Pondaungia	P. cotteri	An amphipithecid	
Pondaungia	P. minuta		

=== Rodents ===
Genus/family	Species	Notes/affinities	Image
Pondaungimys	P. anomaluropsis	An anomalurid	
Phiomyidae?	Phiomyidae? indet.	Possibly two unidentified species	

== Non-mammal fossils ==
The Pondaung Formation has also yielded fossils of fish, birds, and various reptiles (crocodilians, lizards, turtles), but no extensive systematic studies have been conducted on these fossils.

=== Reptiles ===
==== Squamates ====
Genus/family	Species	Notes/affinities	Image
Barbaturex	B. morrisoni	A giant acrodont iguanian	
