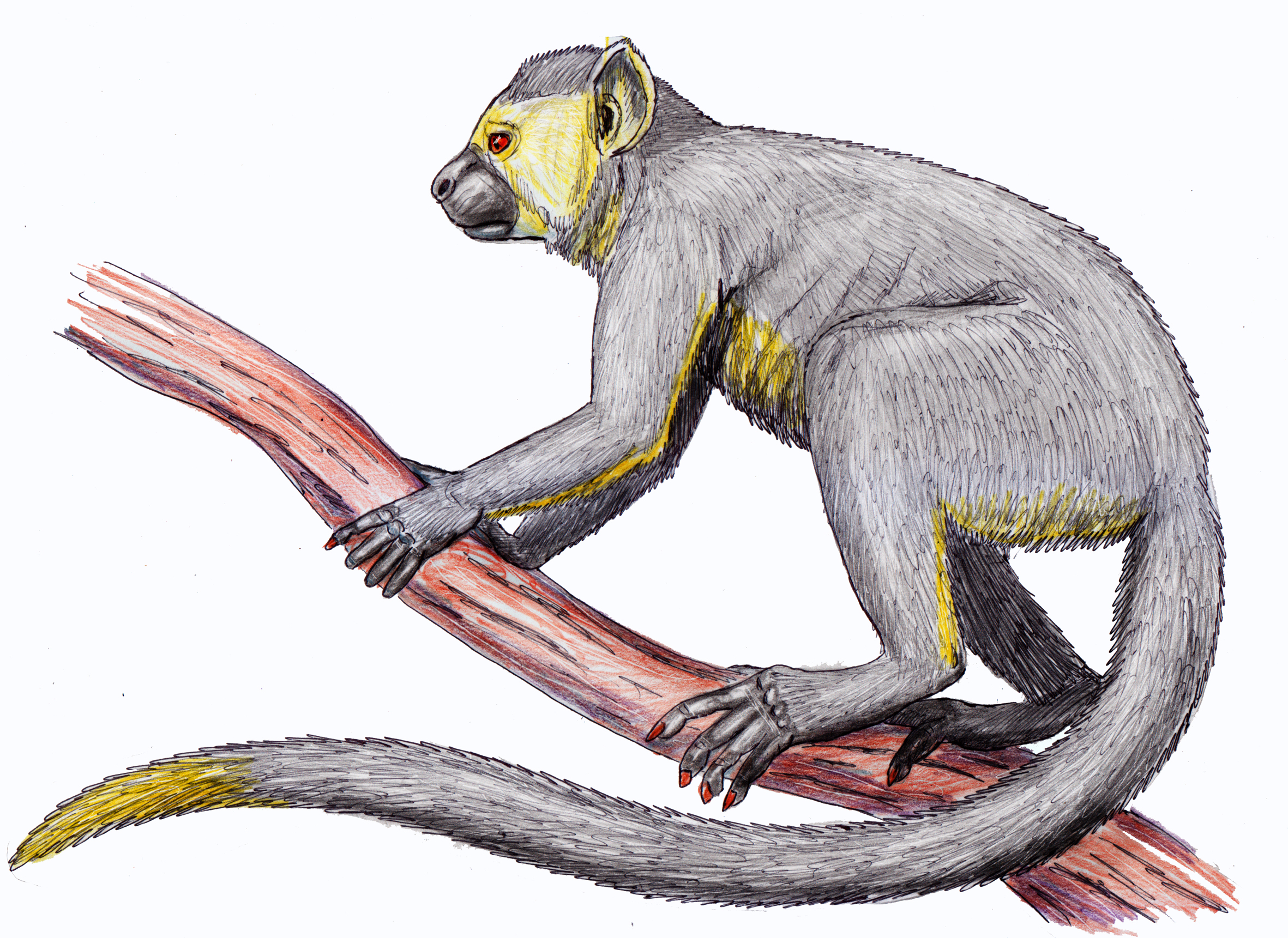
- Life restoration of Eosimias sinensis

Scientific classification
- Kingdom: Animalia
- Phylum: Chordata
- Class: Mammalia
- Infraclass: Placentalia
- Order: Primates
- Suborder: Haplorhini
- Infraorder: †Eosimiiformes; Chaimanee et al., 2012

Taxa
- †Phileosimias; †Afrotarsiidae Ginsburg & Mein, 1987; †Afrotarsius; †Afrasia; †Eosimiidae

= Eosimiiformes =

Eosimiiformes Temporal range: 45–30 Ma Middle Eocene–Early Oligocene

Extinct infraorder of primates

Eosimiiformes is an extinct clade of Paleogene haplorhine primates whose fossils have been found in Africa, South America, and South Asia. They comprised the families Afrotarsiidae and Eosimiidae.

Below is a phylogeny of the eosimiiforms after Marivaux et al. (2023) in their description of Ashaninkacebus:

- - Simiiformes
  - - †Eosimiiformes
      - †Phileosimias
      - - †Afrotarsiidae
          - †Afrotarsius
          - †Afrasia
        - †Eosimiidae
          - †Amamria
          - - - †Eosimias
              - †Phenacopithecus
            - - †Bahinia
              - †Ashaninkacebus
