= Afrotarsius =

Afrotarsius Temporal range: Eocene to Oligocene

Scientific classification
- Kingdom: Animalia
- Phylum: Chordata
- Class: Mammalia
- Infraclass: Placentalia
- Order: Primates
- Infraorder: Tarsiiformes
- Family: †Afrotarsiidae
- Genus: †Afrotarsius; Simons & Bown, 1985

Type species
- †Afrotarsius chatrathi Simons & Bown, 1985

Species
- Afrotarsius chatrathi Simons & Bown, 1985; Afrotarsius libycus Jaeger et al., 2010

Extinct genus of primates

Afrotarsius is a primate found in the Paleogene of Africa.

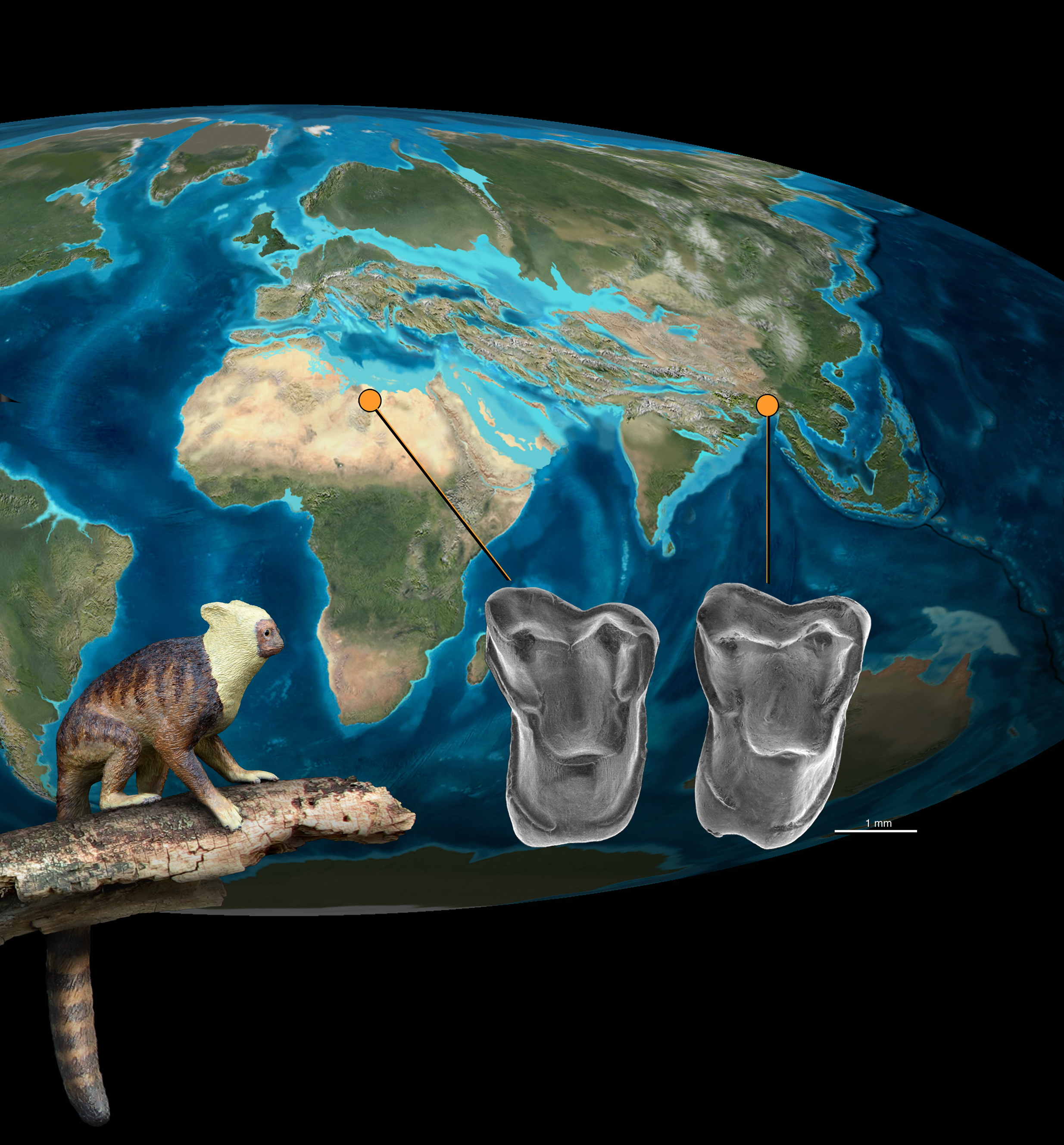
Afrasia from Asia and Afrotarsius from Africa exhibit similar morphology of their teeth and lived in the late middle Eocene, suggesting stem simians dispersed from Asia to Africa around that time.

The first species to be named, Afrotarsius chatrathi, was named in 1985 on the basis of a single lower jaw from the Oligocene of Fayum, Egypt, and tentatively referred to the tarsier family (Tarsiidae). However, this relationship immediately proved controversial, and in 1987 the animal was placed in a separate family Afrotarsiidae related to simians. A tarsier-like tibiofibula was allocated to Afrotarsius in 1998, but the identity of this bone is controversial. In 2010, a second species of the genus, Afrotarsius libycus, was named from the Eocene of Dur At-Talah, Libya, on the basis of isolated upper and lower teeth. Features of these teeth were interpreted as additional evidence for a relationship between Afrotarsius and anthropoids. A second afrotarsiid genus, Afrasia, was named in 2012 from the Eocene Pondaung Formation of Myanmar. In the same paper, Afrotarsiidae was placed together with the Asian Eosimiidae in an infraorder Eosimiiformes, in the simians. However, some studies indicate that it should be placed in Tarsiiformes.

== Evolutionary history ==
Phylogeny of Paleogene simians

- Primates
  - Strepsirrhini (†adapiforms, lemurs, & lorisoids)
  - Haplorhini
    - †Omomyidae + Tarsiidae (tarsiers)
    - - †Eosimiiformes
        - †Afrotarsiidae
          - †Afrasia djijidae
          - †Afrotarsius libycus
        - †Eosimiidae
          - †Bahinia
          - - †Eosimias
            - †Phenacopithecus
      - - - †Parapithecidae
          - †Proteopithecidae
        - - Platyrrhini (New World monkeys)
          - - †Amphipithecidae
            - - †Oligopithecidae
              - †Propliopithecidae

According to Chaimanee et al. 2012, the close relationship between Afrasia djijidae from Southeast Asia and Afrotarsius libycus from North Africa demonstrates one of at least two dispersals of stem simians from Asia to Africa during the middle Eocene.
