= K. Christopher Beard =

American paleontologist

Kenneth Christopher Beard is an American paleontologist, an expert on the primate fossil record and a 2000 MacArthur Fellowship "Genius" Award Winner. Beard's research is reshaping critical debates about the evolutionary origins of mammals, including primates, routinely questioning current thinking about their geographical origins. Dr. Beard is the former Curator of the Carnegie Museum of Natural History, and Mary R. Dawson Chair of Vertebrate Paleontology, at University of Pittsburgh. He is currently Distinguished Foundation Professor, Senior Curator at the University of Kansas. He was co-author with Dan Gebo about an extinct primate from China. Dr. Beard also authored the book The Hunt for the Dawn Monkey: Unearthing the Origins of Monkeys, Apes and Humans. Beard was also part of the research teams that discovered Teilhardina, the earliest primate ever found in North America, and Eosimias, one of the earliest higher primates yet discovered. He worked with NASA to scan a Tyrannosaurus rex skull. Beard received his PhD from the Functional Anatomy and Evolution Program at Johns Hopkins University School of Medicine in 1989.

Below is a list of taxa that Beard has contributed to naming:

Year	Taxon	Authors
2026	Tetonius varleyorum sp. nov.	Rhinehart, Anemone, & Beard
2026	Saharopithecus salemi gen. et sp. nov.	Jaeger, Chaimanee, Benammi, Marivaux, Chavasseau, Beard, Valentin, Hlal, Bilal, Coster, & Brunet
2024	Phenacolemur cavatus sp. nov.	Anemone, Jones, Van Regenmorter, & Beard
2023	Palaeohodites naduensis gen. et sp. nov.	Rust, Ni, Tietjen, & Beard
2023	Ignacius dawsonae sp. nov.	Miller, Tietjen, & Beard
2023	Ignacius mckennai sp. nov.	Miller, Tietjen, & Beard
2023	Ceutholestes acerbus sp. nov.	Jones & Beard
2023	Plagioctenodon dawsonae sp. nov.	Jones & Beard
2023	Plagioctenodon goliath sp. nov.	Jones & Beard
2023	Plagioctenoides cryptos sp. nov.	Jones & Beard
2021	Nesomomys bunodens gen. et sp. nov.	Beard, Métais, Ocakoğlu, & Licht
2021	Altaynycteris aurora gen. et sp. nov.	Jones, Li, Ni, & Beard
2021	Simonsius harujensis sp. nov.	Mattingly, Beard, Coster, Salem, Chaimanee, & Jaeger
2020	Africtis sirtensis gen. et sp. nov.	Mattingly, Beard, Coster, Salem, Chaimanee, & Jaeger
2019	Chiromyoides kesiwah sp. nov.	Beard, Jones, Thurber, & Sanisidro
2018	Orhaniyeia nauta gen. et sp. nov.	Métais, Coster, Kappelman, Licht, Ocakoğlu, Taylor, & Beard
2018	Galatiadelphys minor gen. et sp. nov.	Métais, Coster, Kappelman, Licht, Ocakoğlu, Taylor, & Beard
2018	Anatolianycteris insularis gen. et sp. nov.	Jones, Coster, Licht, Métais, Ocakoğlu, Taylor, & Beard
2018	Carpolestes twelvemilensis sp. nov.	Mattingly, Sanisidro, & Beard
2016	Apidium zuetina sp. nov.	Beard, Coster, Salem, Chaimanee, & Jaeger
2014	Ectypodus arctos sp. nov.	Beard & Dawson
2013	Archicebus achilles gen. et sp. nov.	Ni, Gebo, Dagosto, Meng, Tafforeau, Flynn, & Beard
2013	Tarkops mckennai gen. et sp. nov.	Ni, Meng, Beard, Gebo, Wang, & Li
2008	Teilhardina magnoliana sp. nov.	Beard
2007	Archetypomys erlianensis gen. et sp. nov.	Meng, Li, Ni, Wang, & Beard
2007	Neimengomys qii gen. et sp. nov.	Meng, Ni, Li, Beard, Gebo, Wang, & Wang
2007	Baataromomys ulaanus gen. et sp. nov.	Ni, Beard, Meng, Wang, & Gebo
2004	Eosimias dawsonae sp. nov.	Beard & Wang
2004	Phenacopithecus krishtalkai sp. nov.	Beard & Wang
2004	Phenacopithecus xueshii gen. et sp. nov.	Beard & Wang
1996	Eosimias centennicus sp. nov.	Beard, Tong, Dawson, Wang, & Huang
1994	Macrotarsius macrorhysis sp. nov.	Beard, Qi, Dawson, Wang, & Li
1994	Adapoides troglodytes gen. et sp. nov.	Beard, Qi, Dawson, Wang, & Li
1994	Eosimias sinensis gen. et sp. nov.	Beard, Qi, Dawson, Wang, & Li
1988	Smilodectes gingerichi sp. nov.	Beard
1988	Copelemur australotutus sp. nov.	Beard

== Awards ==
- 2000 MacArthur Fellows Program

== Books ==
- The hunt for the dawn monkey: unearthing the origins of monkeys, apes, and humans, University of California Press, 2004, ISBN 978-0-520-23369-0
- "Mammalian Biogeography and Anthropoid Origins", Primate biogeography: progress and prospects, Editors Shawn M. Lehman, John G. Fleagle, Springer, 2006, ISBN 978-0-387-29871-9
- "Basal Anthropoids", The primate fossil record, Editor Walter Carl Hartwig, Cambridge University Press, 2002, ISBN 978-0-521-66315-1
- "Early Wasatchian Mammals From the Gulf Coastal Plain of Mississippi", Eocene biodiversity: unusual occurrences and rarely sampled habitats, Editor Gregg F. Gunnell, Springer, 2001, ISBN 9780306465284

== Papers ==
- Beard, Kenneth Christopher; Qi, Tao; Dawson, Mary R.; Wang, Banyue; Li, Chuankuei (14 April 1994). "A diverse new primate fauna from middle Eocene fissure-fillings in southeastern China". Nature. 368 (6472): 604–609. Bibcode:1994Natur.368..604B. doi:10.1038/368604a0. ISSN 0028-0836. PMID 8145845.
- Beard, Kenneth Christopher (11 March 2008). "The oldest North American primate and mammalian biogeography during the Paleocene–Eocene Thermal Maximum". Proceedings of the National Academy of Sciences of the United States of America. 105 (10): 3815–3818. Bibcode:2008PNAS..105.3815B. doi:10.1073/pnas.0710180105. ISSN 0027-8424. PMC 2268774. PMID 18316721.
- Beard, Kenneth Christopher; Coster, Pauline M. C.; Ocakoğlu, Faruk; Licht, Alexis; Métais, Grégoire (4 December 2023). "Dental anatomy, phylogenetic relationships and paleoecology of Orhaniyeia nauta (Metatheria, Anatoliadelphyidae), a Gondwanan component of the insular Eocene mammal fauna of Balkanatolia (north-central Turkey)". Journal of Mammalian Evolution. 30 (4): 859–872. doi:10.1007/s10914-023-09680-6. ISSN 1064-7554 – via Springer Nature Link.
- Métais, Grégoire; Coster, Pauline; Licht, Alexis; Ocakoglu, Faruk; Beard, Kenneth Christopher (11 December 2023). "Additions to the late Eocene Süngülü mammal fauna in Easternmost Anatolia and the Eocene-Oligocene transition at the periphery of Balkanatolia". Comptes Rendus Palevol. 22 (35): 711–727.
