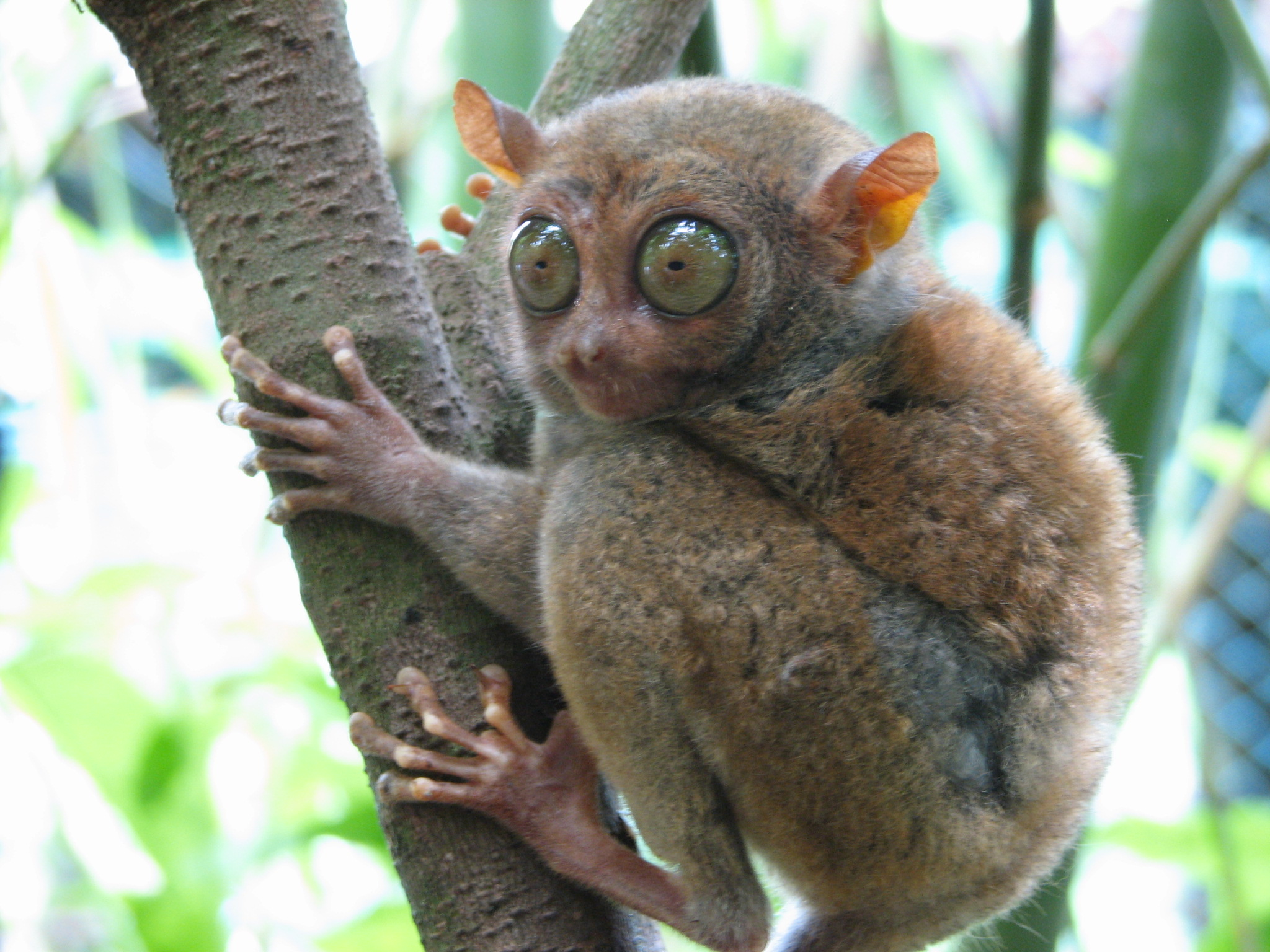
- Carlito syrichta

Scientific classification
- Kingdom: Animalia
- Phylum: Chordata
- Class: Mammalia
- Order: Primates
- Suborder: Haplorhini
- Infraorder: Tarsiiformes; Gregory, 1915

Families
- See text

Synonyms
- †Omomyiformes (cladistically including the Tarsiidae)

= Tarsiiformes =

Tarsiiformes Temporal range: 56–0 Ma Late Paleocene to Recent

Group of primates

Tarsiiformes /ˈtɑːrsi.ɪfɔːrmiːz/ are a group of primates that once ranged across Europe, northern Africa, Asia, and North America, but whose extant species are all found in the islands of Southeast Asia. Tarsiers (family Tarsiidae) are the only living members of the infraorder; other members of Tarsiidae include the extinct Tarsius eocaenus from the Eocene, and Tarsius thailandicus from the Miocene. Two extinct genera, Xanthorhysis and Afrotarsius, are considered to be close relatives of the living tarsiers, and are generally classified within Tarsiiformes, with the former grouped within family Tarsiidae, and the latter listed as incertae sedis (undefined). Omomyids are generally considered to be extinct relatives, or even ancestors, of the living tarsiers, and are often classified within Tarsiiformes.

Other fossil primates, including Microchoeridae, Carpolestidae, and Eosimiidae, have been included in this classification, although the fossil evidence is debated. Eosimiidae has also been classified under the infraorder Simiiformes (with monkeys and apes), and most experts now consider Eosimiidae to be stem simians. Likewise, Carpolestidae is often classified within the order Plesiadapiformes, a very close, extinct relative of primates.

These conflicting classifications lie at the heart of the debate over early primate evolution. Even the placement of Tarsiiformes within suborder Haplorhini, as a sister group to the simians (monkeys and apes), is still debated.

== Classification ==
Generally accepted members of this infraorder include the living tarsiers, the extinct omomyids, two extinct fossil genera, and two extinct fossil species within the genus Tarsius. As haplorhines, they are more closely related to monkeys and apes than to the strepsirrhine primates, which include lemurs, galagos, and lorises.

Infraorder Tarsiiformes/Omomyiformes (Note: Other extinct taxa that are thought to belong to Tarsiiformes but are yet unranked include Ekgmowechashala, Kohatius, Altanius, and Altiatlasius.)

- †Archicebidae
- †Omomyidae (likely paraphyletic)
  - Subfamily Anaptomorphinae
  - Subfamily Microchoerinae
  - Subfamily Omomyinae
- Family Tarsiidae: tarsiers
  - Genus †Afrotarsius (Note: Alternatively, this genus is sometimes listed in the family Afrotarsiidae within Tarsiiformes, or as a family within the infraorder Simiiformes.)
  - Genus †Xanthorhysis
  - Genus Tarsius
  - Genus Cephalopachus
  - Genus Carlito (Note: In 2010, Colin Groves and Myron Shekelle suggested splitting the living tarsiers into three genera: Tarsius, Cephalopachus, and Carlito.)
