= Ganlea =

Ganlea Temporal range: Late Eocene, 37-38 Ma

Scientific classification
- Kingdom: Animalia
- Phylum: Chordata
- Class: Mammalia
- Order: Primates
- Family: †Amphipithecidae
- Genus: †Ganlea; Beard et al., 2009
- Species: †G. megacanina

Binomial name
- †Ganlea megacanina Beard et al., 2009

Extinct genus of primates

Ganlea is a fossil primate from central Myanmar, formerly known as Burma. Its age is about 38 million years, living during the late Eocene epoch. Ganlea belongs to the group of anthropoids (i. e. humans, apes and monkeys), and is in the family Amphipithecidae. It is older than any other known anthropoid from Africa, and is the second oldest known from Asia. Its remains consist of teeth and jawbones belonging to 10 to 15 individuals found near the city of Bagan in the central part of the country.

== Description ==
The teeth of Ganlea have many diagnostic features that help to show its relations with other anthropoids. It is thought to be closely related to the genera Myanmarpithecus, Pondaungia and Siamopithecus, both found from the same area as Ganlea. In all of these genera, the canine tooth is enlarged and compressed anteroposteriorly, making it quite wide. A great deal of tooth wear has been observed in Ganlea, which has been viewed as an adaptation for consuming nuts and seeds, similar to the modern Saki monkey. The large size of the canine tooth in Ganlea gives it the specific name "megacanina".

== Classification ==
Phylogenetic analyses conducted upon the description of Ganlea suggest that the amphipithecids are closely related to New World monkeys (Platyrrhini) and the extinct propliopithecids. This places it firmly within Haplorrhini. Darwinius, a primate recently described and quickly claimed a transitional fossil of great importance to human ancestry, is a member of the Adapiformes, which has recently been viewed as a transitional group between Strepsirrhini and Haplorrhini. This means that Ganlea is more closely related to modern monkeys and apes than Darwinius is.

Because of its age, Ganlea has been called a missing link that places the origin of all anthropoids (including humans) in Asia rather than Africa as was previously thought. However, doubts have been raised towards the claim that it is the ancestor of all other anthropoids. Other extinct primates such as Eosimias seem to be more basal members than Ganlea. Because Ganlea is a true anthropoid, it has been seen as more likely to be a direct ancestor of monkeys and apes (and thus humans) than Darwinius would. However, the phylogenetic analysis that was conducted on it suggests that it is too derived to have been an ancestral anthropoid, and its close relation with New World monkeys seems to imply that it was not a human ancestor, as apes are believed to have evolved from Old World monkeys.

== Palaeobiology ==
The specimen NMMP-39, because of its estimated body mass derived from the size of its talus being 2.7 kg, has been suggested to belong to either Ganlea megacanina or the contemporary primate Myanmarpithecus yarshensis.

=== Palaeoecology ===
Based on its body mass, dental microwear patterns, and shearing quotient quantification, Ganlea engaged in both folivory and frugivory. Its protruding canines were likely used to husk hard fruits in order to access soft seeds inside them.

== See also ==
- Anthrasimias
- Biretia
