= Phileosimias =

Phileosimias Temporal range: 33.9–28.4 Ma Early Oligocene

Scientific classification
- Domain: Eukaryota
- Kingdom: Animalia
- Phylum: Chordata
- Class: Mammalia
- Order: Primates
- Suborder: Haplorhini
- Infraorder: Simiiformes
- Family: †Eosimiidae
- Genus: †Phileosimias; Marivaux et al., 2005

Species
- Phileosimias kamali; Phileosimias brahuiorum

Extinct genus of primates

Phileosimias ("Eosimias ally") is an extinct genus of primates with two species, P. kamli and P. bahuiorum, that are believed to be amongst the early simians.

Marivaux et al. announced in 2005 their discovery of fossils of two new species, Phileosimias kamali and Phileosimias brahuiorum, found in the Bugti Hills of Pakistan. They concluded that Phileosimias are almost certainly early simians. However, they felt the fossil evidence (primarily dental specimens) was insufficient to categorise them as Eosimiidae (along with other early simians) or whether they were sufficiently different to be placed into a separate group. The shapes of their molars and premolars differ from species already classified as Eosimidae.

The two species are Phileosimias brahuiorum and Phileosimias kamali, which is slightly larger, but both are estimated to have weighed about 250 grams. They were extant during the Early Oligocene epoch.

- Simians/ (52) Eosimiidae
  - Eosimiidae s.s. (50)
    - (45)
      - Eosimias (†40 Mya)
      - Phenacopithecus (†42)
    - (45)
      - Bahinia (†32)
      - Nosmips aenigmaticus (†37)
  - - - Phileosimias brahuiorum (†30)
      - Phileosimias kamali (†30)
    - (48)
      More advanced Simians
