= Sungulusimias =

Sungulusimias Temporal range: Eocene

Scientific classification
- Kingdom: Animalia
- Phylum: Chordata
- Class: Mammalia
- Order: Primates
- Suborder: Haplorhini
- Infraorder: Simiiformes
- Family: †Eosimiidae
- Genus: †Sungulusimias
- Species: †S. unayae

Binomial name
- †Sungulusimias unayae Métais et al., 2023

Extinct genus of primates

Sungulusimias is an extinct genus of eosimiid primate that inhabited Turkey during the Eocene epoch. It contains the species S. unayae.
