= Archicebus =

Archicebus Temporal range: Early Eocene, 55.8–54.8 Ma
- Holotype

Scientific classification
- Kingdom: Animalia
- Phylum: Chordata
- Class: Mammalia
- Order: Primates
- Infraorder: Tarsiiformes
- Family: †Archicebidae; Ni et al. 2013
- Genus: †Archicebus; Ni et al. 2013
- Species: †A. achilles

Binomial name
- †Archicebus achilles Ni et al. 2013

Genus of fossil primates that lived in the early Eocene forests (~55 million years ago

Archicebus is a genus of fossil primates that lived in the early Eocene forests (~55.8–54.8 million years ago) of what is now Jingzhou in the Hubei Province in central China, discovered in 2013. The only known species, A. achilles, was a small primate, estimated to weigh about 20–30 grams (0.7–1.1 oz), and is the only known member of the family Archicebidae. When discovered, it was the oldest fossil haplorhine primate skeleton found, appearing to be most closely related to tarsiers and the fossil omomyids, although A. achilles is suggested to have been diurnal, whereas tarsiers are nocturnal. Resembling tarsiers and simians (monkeys and apes), it was a haplorhine primate, and it also may have resembled the last common ancestor of all haplorhines.

== Discovery and naming ==
The holotype is specimen IVPP V18618 and it was discovered across two slabs of slate in c. 2003 by a farmer who was digging in Jingzhou, China.

Archicebus achilles was named and described by Ni et al. (2013).

== Etymology ==
Archicebus achilles was named for being the oldest-known primate skeleton (as of 2013) and for its distinguishing calcaneus (heel bone). The generic name, Archicebus, was constructed from arche (ἀρχή), the Ancient Greek word for "beginning", and cebus, the Latin version of the Ancient Greek kêbos (κῆβος), which refers to a long-tailed monkey. The species name, achilles, is a reference to Achilles, the Greek hero of the Trojan War from Greek mythology.

== Evolutionary history ==
Archicebus achilles exhibits similarities with simians with regard to the shape of its calcaneus and the proportions of its metatarsals, yet its skull, teeth, and appendicular skeleton resemble those of tarsiers. According to phylogenetic analysis, all of these traits taken together suggest it is the most basal member of the tarsiiform clade within the suborder Haplorhini. Considering its age, and since simians are a sister group to tarsiiforms, A. achilles may closely resemble the common ancestor of haplorhines and possibly the last common ancestor of all primates.

Phylogeny of primates

- Primates
  - Strepsirrhini
    - †Adapiformes
    - Lemuriformes (lemurs)
    - Lorisiformes (Lorises & relatives)
  - Haplorhini
    - Tarsiiformes
      - †Archicebus
      - - †Omomyidae
        - Tarsiidae (tarsiers)
    - Anthropoidea
      - Platyrrhini (New World monkeys)
      - Catarrhini
        - Cercopithecoidea (Old World monkeys)
        - Hominoidea (apes)

According to Ni et al. 2013, Archicebus is a basal member of the clade containing tarsiers, making it a close relative of monkeys and apes.

=== Biogeography ===
The discovery of A. achilles adds further support to the hypothesis that primates originated in Asia, and not in Africa, with many simians (a group of them) migrating to the latter continent thereafter.

== Anatomy ==
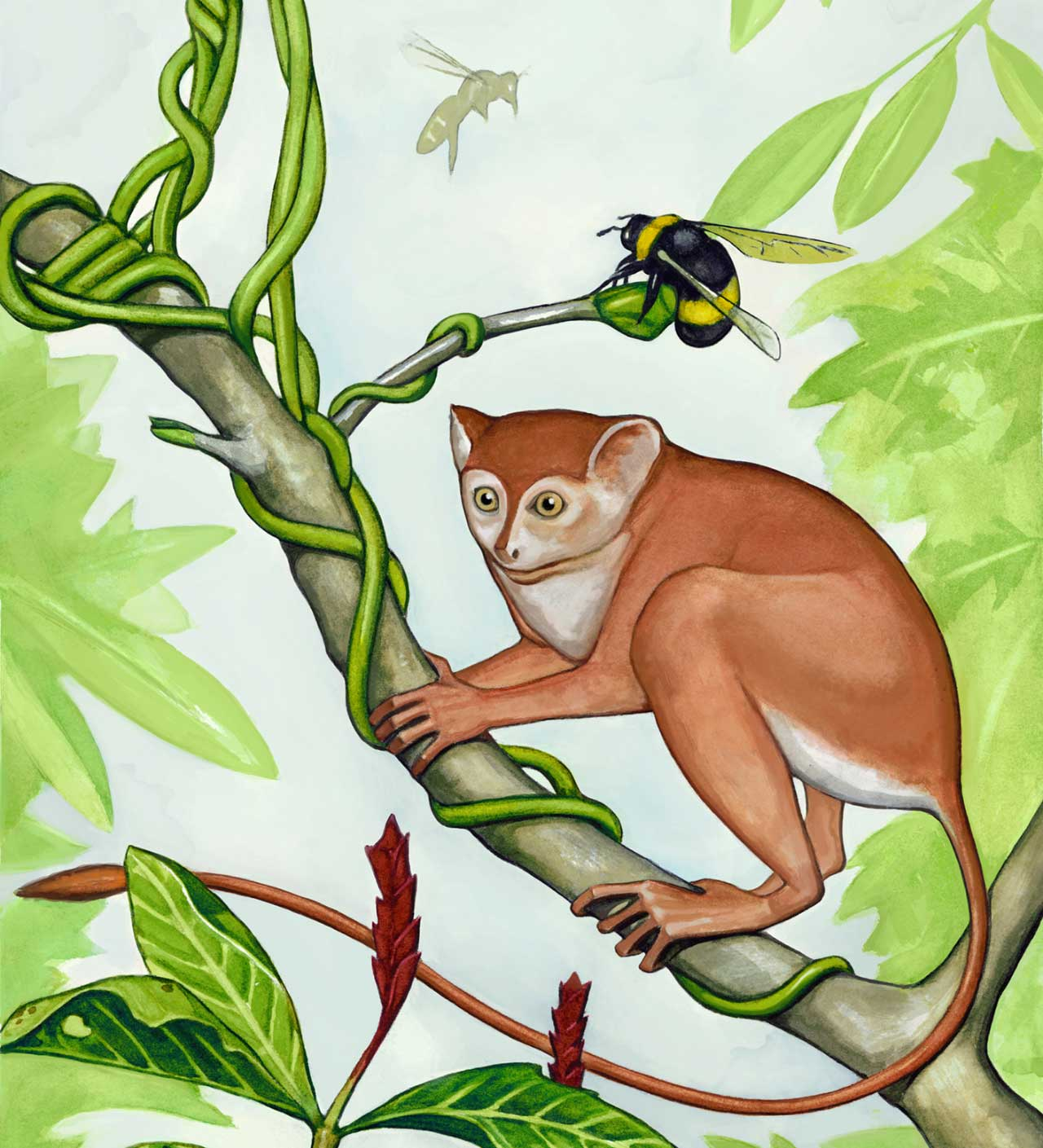
An artist's reconstruction of Archicebus achilles

A. achilles is estimated to have weighed 20 to 30 g (0.7 to 1.1 oz), making it comparable in size to today's smallest living primates, mouse lemurs.

== Range and ecology ==
A. achilles lived in the forests of the warm Eocene epoch, approximately 55.8 to 54.8 million years ago in a part of Asia near what now is Jingzhou, in the southern Hubei Province of China.

Judging from its large canine teeth and sharp crests on its premolars, A. achilles was insectivorous. Unlike tarsiers, however, its smaller eyes suggest it was diurnal, a pattern previously suggested by other early haplorhines, such as Teilhardina asiatica. Its hind limbs suggest it did a lot of leaping; however, its hips, shoulders, and feet also suggest that it was not a vertical clinger and leaper such as tarsiers and galagos are, but likely moved through the trees in a more generalized quadrupedal fashion by grasping tree limbs from above.
