= Afrasia =

Afrasia may refer to:

- Afro-Asia, the landmass consisting of Africa and Asia
- Afro-Eurasia, the landmass consisting of Africa and Eurasia
- Afrasia (primate), a fossil primate from Myanmar
- AfrAsia Bank, a Mauritius bank
