= Adapoides =

Adapoides Temporal range: Early - Late Eocene

Scientific classification
- Domain: Eukaryota
- Kingdom: Animalia
- Phylum: Chordata
- Class: Mammalia
- Order: Primates
- Suborder: Strepsirrhini
- Family: †Adapidae
- Genus: †Adapoides; Beard et al., 1994
- Species: †A. troglodytes

Binomial name
- †Adapoides troglodytes Beard et al., 1994

Extinct genus of primates

Adapoides is a genus of adapiform primate dating to the Middle Eocene in Asia. It is represented by one species, Adapoides troglodytes.
