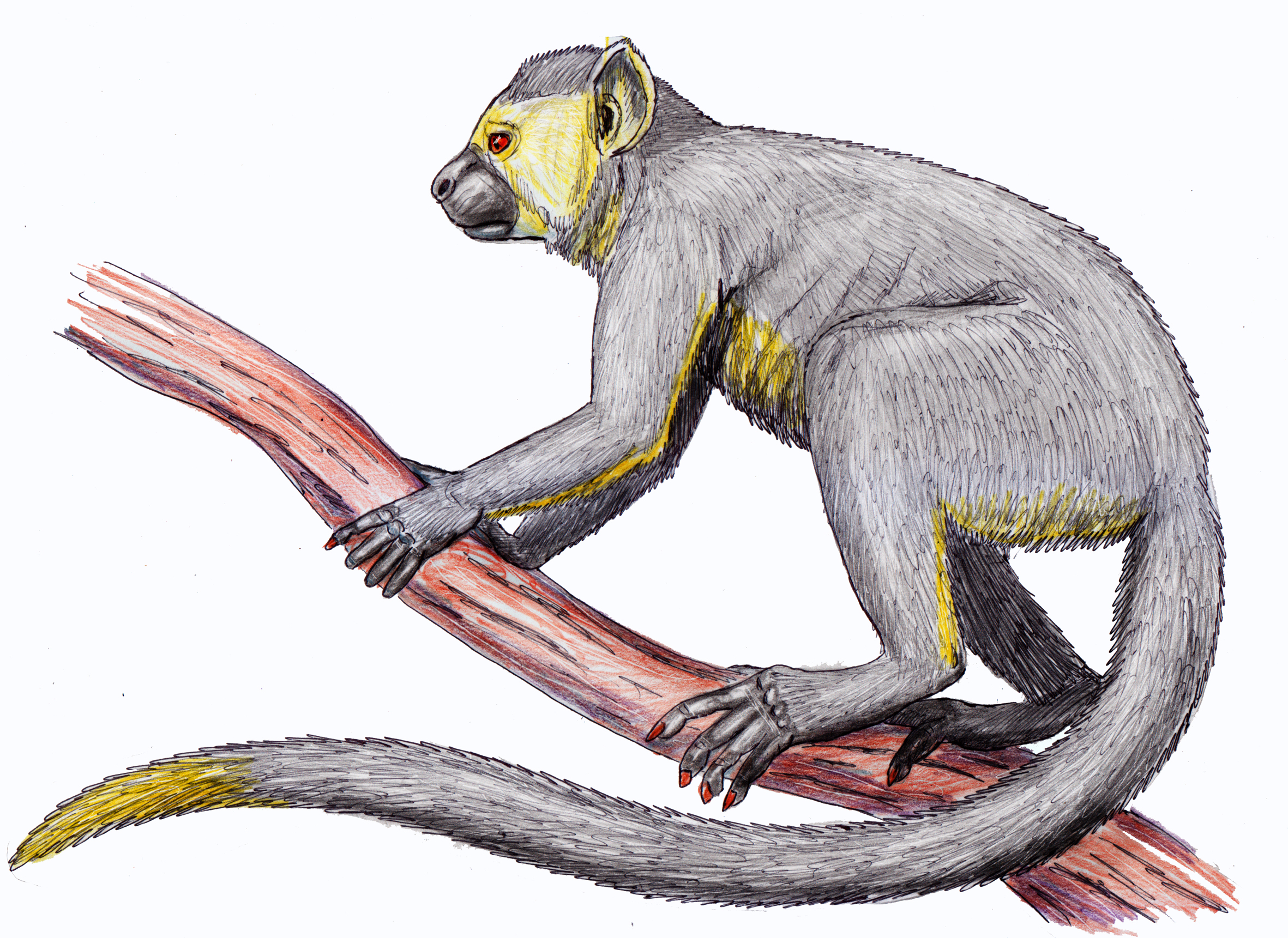
- Life restoration of Eosimias sinensis

Scientific classification
- Kingdom: Animalia
- Phylum: Chordata
- Class: Mammalia
- Infraclass: Placentalia
- Order: Primates
- Infraorder: Simiiformes
- Family: †Eosimiidae; Beard et al., 1994

Genera
- †Anthrasimias; †Ashaninkacebus; †Bahinia; †Eosimias; †Phenacopithecus; †Sungulusimias; †Phileosimias; †Nosmips?

= Eosimiidae =

Eosimiidae Temporal range: 45–30 Ma Middle Eocene–Early Oligocene

Family of primates that are possibly extinct

Eosimiidae is the possible family of extinct primates believed to be the earliest simians.

== Taxonomy ==
When they were discovered, the possibility that eosimiids were outside and ancestral to simians was considered (Culotta 1992), but subsequent work showed them to be true simians (Kay et al. 1997, Ross et al. 1998). Some scholars continue to question whether the eosimiids are simians, as they seem closer to Tarsiiformes - Gunnell and Miller (2001), for instance, found that eosimiid morphology did not match up to anthropoid (i.e. simian) morphology. However, most experts now place eosimiids as stem simians - Williams, Kay and Kirk (2010) note more and more evidence points to that conclusion.

Williams, Kay and Kirk note that (as at late 2009), accounting for all proposed species, there would be 11 species in total in 8 genera (Amphipithecidae, Anthrasimias, Ashaninkacebus, Bahinia, Eosimias, Phenacopithecus, Phileosimias, Sungulusimias). There appears to be a wealthy diversity of eosimiids in Brazil, China, India, Myanmar, Pakistan and Turkey.

With several genera, such as Phileosimias, and Anthrasimias, their classification as eosimiids appears to be unclear. Marivaux et al. (2005) suggest three definite groups of Eosimiidae: Bahinia, Phenacopithecus and Eosimias. They announced their discovery of fossils of two new species, Phileosimias kamali and Phileosimias brahuiorum. They concluded that Phileosimias are also early simians, and that the more modern simians may have emerged as their sister group. Williams, Kay and Kirk (2010) note that both Gunnell et al. (2008) and Kay et al. (2009) argue that Anthrasimias should be classified as Adapiforms, and that Rosenberger and Hogg express doubts about Bahinia pondaungensis. They also note that whilst most analyses link Amphipithecidae to anthropoids (i.e. simians), there is a lack of certainty as they show resemblances to adapiforms and omomyiforms as well as to catarrhine simians.

== Phylogeny ==
Below is a phylogenic tree with some of the extinct simian species with the more modern species emerging within the Eosimiidae. Anthrasimias is not shown. The simians originated in Asia, while the crown simians were in Afro-Arabia. It is indicated approximately how many million years ago (Mya) the clades diverged into newer clades. In this tree, Eosimiidae as conventionally defined, shown as italic, is a paraphyletic, 'grade' or stem group in this assessment. Paraphyletic groupings are problematic, as one can not talk precisely about their phylogenic relationships, their characteristic traits and literal extinction. Cladistically the 'higher' monkeys are included. The Ekgmowechashalidae are more frequently recovered as adapiforms in recent analyses, in which case Eosimiidae may become equivalent to the simians. Alternatively, with Phileosimias and Amphipithecidae placed outside of Eosimiidae sensu stricto, monophyly would be restored.

- Haplorhini (64)
  - Tarsiiformes
  - Simians (54)
    - Ekgmowechashalidae (39)
      - Muangthanhinius (†32 Mya)
      - (36)
        - Gatanthropus micros (†30)
        - Bugtilemur (†29)
      - Ekgmowechashala
    - Eosimiidae (52)
      - Eosimiidae s.s.(50)
        - (45)
          - Eosimias (†40)
          - Phenacopithecus (†42)
        - (45)
          - Bahinia (†32)
          - Nosmips aenigmaticus (†37)
      - - Phileosimias (†30)
        - (48)
          - Amphipithecidae (†35)
          - (45)
            - Parapithecoidea (†30)
            - (42)
              - Proteopithecus sylviae (†34)
              - Crown Simia (40)

== See also ==
- Evolutionary biology
- Afrasia
