= Altiatlasius =

Altiatlasius Temporal range: Late Paleocene, 57 Ma

Scientific classification
- Kingdom: Animalia
- Phylum: Chordata
- Class: Mammalia
- Infraclass: Placentalia
- Order: Primates
- Genus: †Altiatlasius; Sigé et al., 1990
- Species: †A. koulchii

Binomial name
- †Altiatlasius koulchii Sigé et al., 1990

Extinct genus of primates

Altiatlasius is an extinct genus of mammal, which may have been the oldest known primate, dating to the Late Paleocene (c.57 ma) from Morocco. The only species, Altiatlasius koulchii, was described in 1990.

Its true taxonomic position remains controversial. It has also been suggested that it should be classified as a plesiadapiform (an extinct group of arboreal mammals thought to be ancestral to primates) or that it should be recognized as a euprimate, either as an omomyid (a branch of fossil primates thought to be closely related to tarsiers), an early tarsiiform, or the oldest stem simian (monkeys and apes).

== Evolutionary history and taxonomy ==
Altiatlasius koulchii, potentially the oldest known euprimate, is known only from ten isolated upper and lower molars and a fragment of a mandible. (Note: A lower molar and two half-teeth have also been found in the region and are suspected to be related to Altiatlasius.) These fossils date to the Late Paleocene, approximately 57 million years ago, (Note: According to molecular clock studies, the last common ancestor of all primates is estimated to date between 63 and 90 million years ago. Yet the oldest estimates conflict with the fossil record.) and come from the Jbel Guersif Formation in the Ouarzazate Basin of Morocco. First described in 1990 by Sigé et al., Altiatlasius was originally proposed to be an omomyid, possibly close to the split with simians (monkeys and apes). It has also been classified in the family Toliapinidae, a type of plesiadapiform found in Europe. Other classifications assume they are stem euprimates, eosimiid-like simians, or an early tarsiiform. Many authorities consider Altiatlasius to be the oldest stem simian. Godinot (1994) and Bajpai et al. (2008) both support the view that it is an early anthropoid (simian).

Together with the Early to Middle Eocene fossil primate Algeripithecus (originally thought to be the oldest crown simian) from Algeria, Altiatlasius helped strengthen the argument for an African origin of simian primates. However, when additional fossil remains of Algeripithecus were found, it was shown to be a strepsirrhine primate instead of a haplorhine, placing it with the azibiids, a group thought to be most closely related to lemuriforms (living lemurs and lorisoids). Because Algeripithecus was radically reclassified with the discovery of more fossils, equally fragmentary remains of Altiatlasius leave its phylogenetic affinities questionable. Also, the 20 million year gap in the fossil record between Altiatlasius and the first parapithecoids raises questions about the validity of the African origins hypothesis for simians.
