= Ashaninkacebus =

Ashaninkacebus Temporal range: Palaeogene

Scientific classification
- Kingdom: Animalia
- Phylum: Chordata
- Class: Mammalia
- Order: Primates
- Family: †Eosimiidae
- Genus: †Ashaninkacebus
- Species: †A. simpsoni

Binomial name
- †Ashaninkacebus simpsoni Marivaux et al., 2023

Extinct genus of primates

Ashaninkacebus is an extinct genus of eosimiid that lived around the time of the Eocene-Oligocene transition. The discovery of Ashaninkacebus has been used to suggest there was a third colonization of South America by primates, alongside the rafting events undergone by Platyrrhines and Parapithecids in the Paleogene.

== Taxonomy ==
Ashaninkacebus is a member of the Eosimiidae, a family considered to be stem-simians. The genus contains one species, A. simpsoni. The name of the genus is derived from the Asháninka ethnic group native to the region in which the fossils were discovered, as well as the Ancient Greek "cebus" (meaning "monkey"). The species name is referring to George Gaylord Simpson, a prominent mid-20th century paleontologist.

== Description ==
A. simpsoni is known from a single tooth, in specific the upper first molar. The molar is low-crowned, and lacks conules or a parastyle (a cusp on the buccal side of the tooth), though the tooth has a complete buccal cingulum, a trait rarely seen in non-eosimiid primates. Features of the dental anatomy have been compared to contemporary basal platyrrhines such as Perupithecus, with both taxa having similar dental morphology to South Asian members of Eosimiidae and African relatives of Oligopithecids respectively.

== Distribution ==
Fossils of A. simpsoni have been found in Western Amazonia.
