= Archetypomys =

Archetypomys Temporal range: early Eocene

Scientific classification
- Kingdom: Animalia
- Phylum: Chordata
- Class: Mammalia
- Order: Rodentia
- Family: †Archetypomyidae; Meng et al., 2007
- Genus: †Archetypomys; Meng et al., 2007
- Species: †A. erlianensis

Binomial name
- †Archetypomys erlianensis Meng et al. 2007

Extinct genus of rodents

Archetypomys is an extinct genus of early Eocene rodent and the only member of the family Archetypomyidae. A single species, Archetypomys erlianensis, has been described from Inner Mongolia. Archetypomys was a very small rodent intermediate in morphology between the basal rodent family Alagomyidae and more advanced rodents.
