= Marcgodinotius =

Marcgodinotius Temporal range: 56.0–47.8 Ma Early Eocene

Scientific classification
- Kingdom: Animalia
- Phylum: Chordata
- Class: Mammalia
- Infraclass: Placentalia
- Order: Primates
- Suborder: Strepsirrhini
- Family: †Notharctidae
- Genus: †Marcgodinotius; Bajpai et al., 2005
- Species: †M. indicus

Binomial name
- †Marcgodinotius indicus Bajpai et al., 2005

Extinct genus of primates

Marcgodinotius is a genus of adapiform primate that lived in Asia during the early Eocene. It is a monotypic genus, the only species being Marcgodinotius indicus. Another adapiform primate Suratius robustus was found in the same horizon. Anthrasimias may be a junior synonym of Marcgodinotius and Anthrasimias gujaratensis a junior synonym of Marcgodinotius indicus.

Marcgodinotius indicus was a species of primate first found in Gujarat, India in 2005. It is believed to have lived about 55 million years ago, during the early Eocene. It weighed around 75 grams which would make it only slightly larger than the world's smallest primates, the mouse lemurs and the dwarf galagos.

The generic name, Anthrasimias, referred to anthra, Greek for coal, because the fossils were found in a coal mine, and simias, Latin for monkey or ape.

Additional material (a partial left petrosal bone and a fragmenatry stapes bone) likely belonging to the genus from the Vastan Lignite Mine of the Cambay Shale Formation also in Gujarat, this find is one of the oldest euprimate petrosal bones known to date.

== See also ==
- Ganlea
- Biretia
