= Nosmips =

Nosmips Temporal range: 38.0–33.9 Ma Late Eocene

Scientific classification
- Domain: Eukaryota
- Kingdom: Animalia
- Phylum: Chordata
- Class: Mammalia
- Order: Primates
- Family: incertae sedis
- Genus: †Nosmips; Seiffert, 2010
- Species: †N. aenigmaticus

Binomial name
- †Nosmips aenigmaticus Seiffert, 2010

Extinct genus of primates

Nosmips aenigmaticus is a rare fossil primate known only from 12 teeth. Most teeth were found at a site in the Fayum Depression about 40 miles (64 km) outside Cairo, Egypt.

Nosmips aenigmaticus probably lived 37 million years ago in Africa and has not been successfully classified within any group of primates. In particular, it is distinct from the three main branches of primate found in Africa at the time - anthropoids, adapiforms and lemuriforms. It is weakly associated with the Eosimiidae. Its premolars are specialised and the tooth enamel displays extensive signs of pitting, which would appear to be consistent with a diet of either seeds or fruits with hard pits.

== Name ==
Nosmips is an anagram of Simpson. The name was chosen to honour paleontologist and anagram enthusiast George Gaylord Simpson.
