= Anthracohyus =

Scientific classification
- Domain: Eukaryota
- Kingdom: Animalia
- Phylum: Chordata
- Class: Mammalia
- Order: Artiodactyla
- Family: †Anthracotheriidae
- Genus: †Anthracohyus

Extinct genus of mammals

Anthracohyus was a genus of extinct artiodactyl ungulate mammal belonging to Anthracotheriidae that lived in Asia during the middle to late Eocene.

== Taxonomy ==
Anthracohyus is treated as a junior synonym of Anthracotherium by Tsubamoto et al. (2002) based on similarities in dental morphology. However, this synonymy was rejected by Lihoreau and Ducrocq (2007).

== Distribution ==
Fossils of Anthracohyus are known from Myanmar, and Thailand.
