= Muangthanhinius =

Muangthanhinius Temporal range: Late Eocene

Scientific classification
- Domain: Eukaryota
- Kingdom: Animalia
- Phylum: Chordata
- Class: Mammalia
- Order: Primates
- Suborder: Strepsirrhini
- Infraorder: †Adapiformes
- Family: †incertae sedis
- Genus: †Muangthanhinius; Marivaux et al., 2006
- Species: †M. siami

Binomial name
- †Muangthanhinius siami Marivaux et al., 2006

Extinct genus of primates

Muangthanhinius is a genus of adapiform primate that lived in Asia during the late Eocene.

== Classification ==
Muangthanhinius was initially classified as incertae sedis within Adapiformes because Marivaux et al. (2006) noted its distinctness from other named adapiform families. The authors noted its similarity to Bugtilemur, questioning the latter's putative lemuriform affinities. Ni et al. (2016) recovered Muangthanhinius as part of the family Ekgmowechashalidae along with Ekgmowechashala, Bugtilemur, and Gatanthropus.
