= Kyitchaungia =

Kyitchaungia Temporal range: Eocene

Scientific classification
- Kingdom: Animalia
- Phylum: Chordata
- Class: Mammalia
- Order: Primates
- Suborder: Strepsirrhini
- Family: †Sivaladapidae
- Genus: †Kyitchaungia; Beard et al. 2007
- Species: †K. takaii

Binomial name
- †Kyitchaungia takaii Beard et al. 2007

Extinct genus of primates

Kyitchaungia is an extinct monotypic genus of adapiform primate that lived in Asia during the Eocene.

== Etymology ==
The generic name Kyitchaungia derives from the Burmese word kyitchaung, meaning gully or depression. The specific epithet of the type species, Kyitchaungia takaii, honours Dr. Masanaru Takai, who organised the expedition that discovered the holotype of Kyitchaungia.

== Palaeobiology ==
=== Locomotion ===
The proximal femur morphology of Kyitchaungia indicates that the genus was anatomically adapted for arboreal quadrupedal locomotion and possessed competency at leaping as well.
