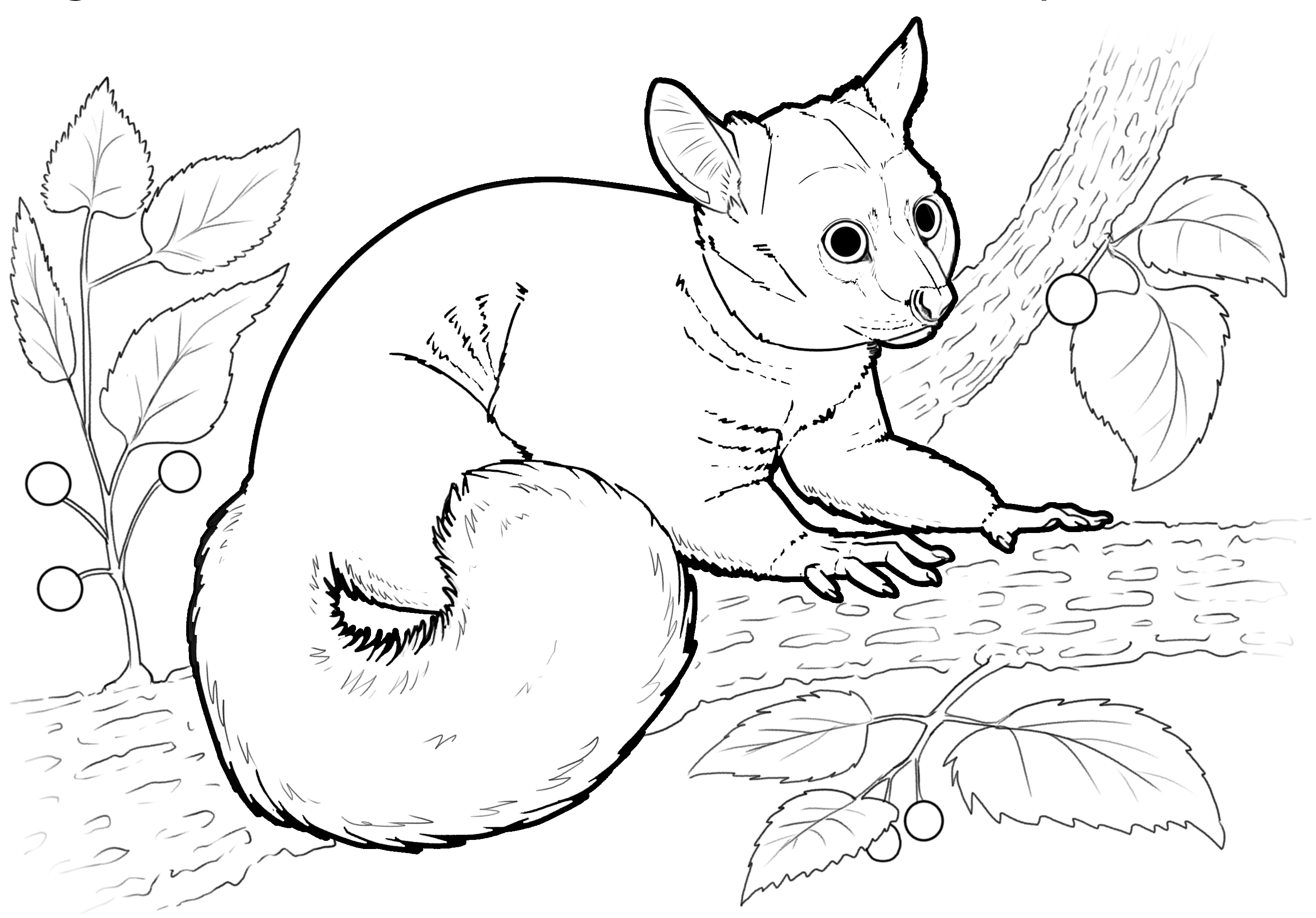
- Life restoration

Scientific classification
- Kingdom: Animalia
- Phylum: Chordata
- Class: Mammalia
- Order: Primates
- Suborder: Strepsirrhini
- Infraorder: †Adapiformes
- Family: †Ekgmowechashalidae
- Genus: †Ekgmowechashala; Macdonald, 1963

Type species
- †Ekgmowechashala philotau Macdonald, 1963

Species
- †Ekgmowechashala philotau Macdonald, 1963; †Ekgmowechashala zancanellai Samuels, Albright, and Fremd, 2015

= Ekgmowechashala =

Ekgmowechashala Temporal range: 30.8–26.3 Ma

Extinct genus of primates

Ekgmowechashala (Sioux: "little cat man") is an extinct genus of primate belonging to Adapiformes.

== Description and significance ==
With a weight of approximately 5 pounds (2.3 kg), around 1 foot (0.3 m) tall and resembling a lemur, Ekgmowechashala is the only known North American primate of its time; it lived during the late Oligocene and early Miocene.

== Classification ==
The classification of this form has long been problematic. It was variously classified as a member of the extinct family Omomyidae (related to tarsiers) and the similarly extinct Plagiomenidae (related to colugos), but has been recently reassigned to Adapiformes, the extinct relatives of lemurs and other strepsirrhines. A cladistic analysis by Ni et al. (2016) reaffirmed the adapiform placement of Ekgmowechashala by recovering it as sister group to Bugtilemur, Gatanthropus, and Muangthanhinius in Ekgmowechashalidae. An analysis by Rust et al. (2023) found Ekgmowechashala to be most closely related to the newly described Palaeohodites naduensis from the late Eocene of China, and erected the subfamily Ekgmowechashalinae to encompass the two genera.

== Paleobiology ==
The shape of its teeth, and their likeness to those of raccoons, indicate that it ate soft fruit provided by the warm forests of the Rocky Mountains during the early Miocene.

== Fossils ==
Fossil evidence of Ekgmowechashala was discovered on the Pine Ridge Indian Reservation, an Oglala Sioux Native American reservation in South Dakota. Molars were found in 1981 in the basin of John Day River, and these are in the collection of the Burke Museum of Natural History and Culture; in the summer of 1997 John Zancanella of the Bureau of Land Management found a lower molar in the John Day Fossil Beds National Monument.

Ekgmowechashala philotau, known from material in Nebraska and South Dakota, was thought to be the only species of this genus, but material from Oregon has been recently described as a new species, E. zancanellai. A tooth from the Toledo Bend Ranch Local Fauna of far eastern Texas has been assigned to this genus.

== See also ==
- List of fossil primates
