= Paukkaungia =

Paukkaungia Temporal range: Eocene

Scientific classification
- Domain: Eukaryota
- Kingdom: Animalia
- Phylum: Chordata
- Class: Mammalia
- Order: Primates
- Suborder: Strepsirrhini
- Family: †Sivaladapidae
- Genus: †Paukkaungia; Beard et al. 2007
- Species: †P. parva

Binomial name
- †Paukkaungia parva Beard et al. 2007

Extinct genus of primates

Paukkaungia is a genus of adapiform primate that lived in Asia during the Eocene.
