= Amphipithecidae =

Amphipithecidae Temporal range: 38–28.4 Ma Late Eocene to Early Oligocene

Scientific classification
- Kingdom: Animalia
- Phylum: Chordata
- Class: Mammalia
- Order: Primates
- Suborder: Haplorhini
- Infraorder: Simiiformes
- Family: †Amphipithecidae; Godinot, 1994

Extinct family of primates

The Amphipithecidae were simian primates that lived in Late Eocene and Early Oligocene. Fossils have been found in Myanmar, Thailand, and Pakistan. The limited fossil evidence is consistent with, but not exclusive to, arboreal quadrupedalism. In other words, the species may have moved about in trees on four legs, but not with regular leaping as seen in later simians.

What little is known suggests that they are neither adapiform nor omomyid primates, two of the earliest primate groups to appear in the fossil record. Deep mandibles and mandibular molars with low, broad crowns suggest they are simians, a group that includes monkeys, apes, and humans, but are not within the two major extant groups of simians, the Catarrhini and Platyrrhini. Most scholars place them in the simians. However, some scholars suggest that their similarities to simians is the result of convergent evolution and that they should instead be considered Adapiformes.

According to Beard et al., Siamopithecus is the most basal form of amphipithecid.

They vary in size from 6–7 kg (Siamopithecus and Pondaungia), to 1–2 kg (Myanmarpithecus), with Bugtipithecus being even smaller. A number of scholars speculate that the teeth and jaws of the larger Amphipithecidae indicate that they fed on seeds and fruit with hard exteriors, whilst smaller species such as Myanmarpithecus ate soft fruit.

Pondaungia and Amphipithecus are now considered by scholars to be part of the same genus.

== Species ==
- Amphipithecus mogaungensis
- Bugtipithecus inexpectans
- Ganlea megacanina
- Myanmarpithecus yarshensis
- Pondaungia cotteri
- Siamopithecus eocaenus

== Discoveries ==
When fossil hunter Barnum Brown was prospecting along areas of Pondaung Sandstone in Myanmar in 1923, he discovered a mandible with three teeth (Amphipithecus mogaungensis). He did not recognise the significance of his find until 14 years later, when Edwin H. Colbert identified the fossil as a new species of primate and the earliest known simian.

In May 2005, the discovery of dozens of new primate fossils, mainly single teeth, in the Bugti Hills of Pakistan, was announced. They were recognised as belonging to three new species, including Bugtipithecus inexpectans, dated back to the Oligocene some 30 million years ago. (The other new species were in the Eosimiidae family).

In July 2009, the discovery of Ganlea megacanina in the late-middle Eocene Pondaung Formation in central Myanmar was announced. It is smaller than Pondaungia, but larger than Myanmarpithecus. Its robust dentary includes a notably large lower canine tooth, but it had tiny incisors.
