= Pondaungia =

Pondaungia Temporal range: Bartonian

Scientific classification
- Kingdom: Animalia
- Phylum: Chordata
- Class: Mammalia
- Order: Primates
- Family: †Amphipithecidae
- Genus: †Pondaungia; Pilgrim, 1927

Type species
- Pondaungia cotteri Pilgrim, 1927

Other species
- Pondaungia minuta Jaeger and Thein, 1999

Extinct genus of amphipithecid primate

Pondaungia is an extinct genus of amphipithecid primate that lived in Myanmar during the Bartonian stage of the Eocene epoch.

== Description ==
Pondaungia cotteri possessed an extremely robust and massive lower jaw, characterised by a deep mandibular corpus, a thick superior mandibular torus, and an exceptionally robust horizontal ramus. In contrast to most anthropoid primates, it had an unfused mandibular symphysis similar to that of prosimians. Its dental arcade had a parabolic shape.

== Palaeobiology ==
=== Diet ===
Based on the thick enamel of its bunodont molars, its large incisors, and its well developed superficial masseter muscle, Pondaungia was a hard object feeder that was adapted to consume seeds and nuts.

=== Locomotion ===
Based on its talar morphology, Pondaungia was a generalised arboreal quadruped. Its talus did, however, have some characteristics indicating it was also competent at leaping, such as slight trochlear grooving, an almost straight talar neck of moderate length, a relatively high body of the talus, and a rather steep medial talotibial facet.
