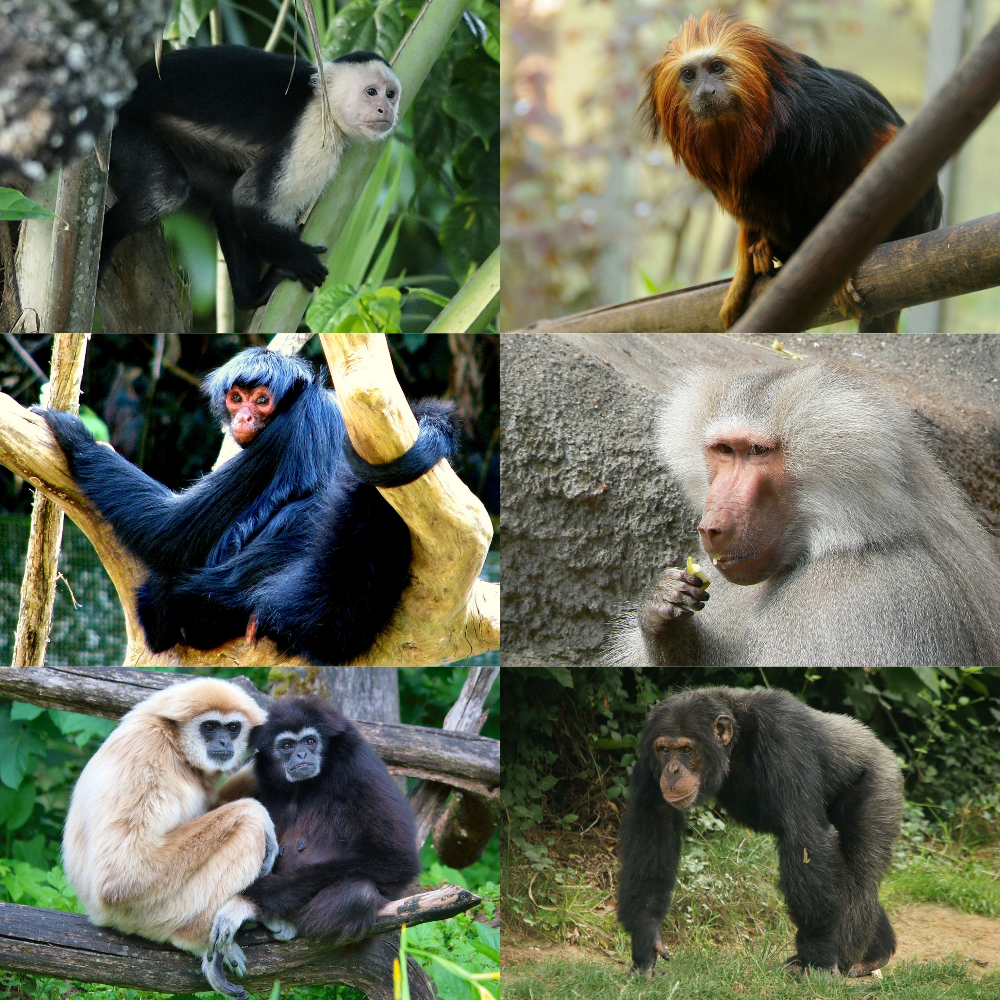

Scientific classification
- Kingdom: Animalia
- Phylum: Chordata
- Class: Mammalia
- Order: Primates
- Suborder: Haplorhini
- Infraorder: Simiiformes; Haeckel, 1866

Parvorders
- Catarrhini; Platyrrhini

Synonyms
- Anthropoids; Pithecoidea; Simiae; Pitheci

= Simian =

Simians Temporal range: Middle Eocene-Holocene, 40–0 Ma

Infraorder of primates

There is a request, submitted by Playdoh2231 (talk), for an audio version of this article to be created. For further information, see WikiProject Spoken Wikipedia. Before starting the task, please check here.

The simians, anthropoids, or higher primates (simian from Latin: simis, lit. 'monkey') are primates of the infraorder Simiiformes (/ˈsɪmi.ɪfɔːrmiːz/), containing all animals traditionally called monkeys and apes. More precisely, they consist of the parvorders Platyrrhini (New World monkeys) and Catarrhini, the latter of which consists of the family Cercopithecidae (Old World monkeys in the stricter sense) and the superfamily Hominoidea (apes – including humans).

The simians are sister group to the tarsiers (Tarsiiformes), together forming the haplorhines. The radiation occurred about 60 million years ago (during the Cenozoic era); 40 million years ago, simians colonized South America, giving rise to the New World monkeys. The remaining simians (catarrhines) split about 25 million years ago into Cercopithecidae and Hominoidea.

== Biological key-features ==
Biological features common to all or most simians include genetic similarities, similarities in eye location and the muscles close to the eyes, internal similarities between ears, dental similarities, and similarities on foot bone structure. The earliest simians were small primates with varied diets, forward-facing eyes, acute color vision for daytime lifestyles, and brains devoted more to vision and less to smell. Living simians in both the New World and the Old World have larger brains than other primates, but they evolved these larger brains independently.

Simians characteristically have relatively large brains, fused mandibles, binocular and color vision, and the females have a single fused uterus. They also have fewer teeth and are more sexually dimorphic in terms of body size and anatomy.

The traits that separate New World simians from Old World simians are the nostrils and their dentation (teeth). New World simians have broad noses with forward facing nostrils and three premolars in each quadrant of the mouth, while Old World simians have narrower noses with downward facing nostrils and a narrow septum and only have two premolars.

== Taxonomy ==
In earlier classification, New World monkeys, Old World monkeys, apes, and humans – collectively known as simians or anthropoids – were grouped under Anthropoidea (/ˌænθrəˈpɔɪdi.ə/; from Ancient Greek ἄνθρωπος (ánthrōpos) 'human' and -οειδής (-oeidḗs) 'resembling, connected to, etc.'), while the strepsirrhines and tarsiers were grouped under the suborder "Prosimii". Under modern classification, the tarsiers and simians are grouped under the suborder Haplorhini, while the strepsirrhines are placed in suborder Strepsirrhini. Strong genetic evidence for this is that five SINEs are common to all haplorhines whilst absent in strepsirrhines — even one being coincidental between tarsiers and simians would be quite unlikely. Despite this preferred taxonomic division, "prosimian" is still regularly found in textbooks and the academic literaturebecause of familiarity, a condition likened to the use of the metric system in the sciences and the use of customary units elsewhere in the United States. In the Anthropoidea, evidence indicates that the Old World and New World primates went through parallel evolution.

Primatology, paleoanthropology, and other related fields are split on their usage of the synonymous infraorder names, Simiiformes and Anthropoidea. According to Robert Hoffstetter (and supported by Colin Groves), the term Simiiformes has priority over Anthropoidea because the taxonomic term Simii by van der Hoeven, from which it is constructed, dates to 1833. In contrast, Anthropoidea by Mivart dates to 1864, while Simiiformes by Haeckel dates to 1866, leading to counterclaims of priority. Hoffstetter also argued that Simiiformes is also constructed like a proper infraorder name (ending in "iformes"), whereas Anthropoidea ends in -"oidea", which is reserved for superfamilies. He also noted that Anthropoidea is too easily confused with "anthropoïdes", which translates to "apes" from several languages.

Some lines of extinct simian also are either placed into the Eosimiidae (to reflect their Eocene origin) and sometimes in Amphipithecidae, thought to originate in the Early Oligocene. Additionally, Phileosimias is sometimes placed in the Eosimiidae and sometimes categorised separately.

== Evolution ==
One theory for the origin of anthropoid primates is that they originated in Africa, with taxa appearing as early as Altiatlasius potentially being suggested to be stem group anthropoids. However, there is also a competing theory suggesting that they may have originated in Asia during the middle to late Eocene, having crossed the Tethys Sea on natural rafts or floating islands alongside other Asian mammals.

The New World monkeys in parvorder Platyrrhini split from the rest of the simian line about 40 million years ago (mya), leaving the parvorder Catarrhini occupying the Old World. This latter group split about 25 mya between the Cercopithecidae and the apes, making Cercopithecidae more closely related to the apes than to the Platyrrhini.

== Classification ==
Phylogeny of living (extant) primates

- Primates (80 Mya)
  - Haplorhini (63 Mya)
    - Simiiformes (42.6 Mya)
      - Catarrhini (29.0 Mya)
        - Hominoidea
        - Cercopithecoidea
      - Platyrrhini
    - Tarsiiformes
  - Strepsirrhini

Cladogram. For each clade, it is indicated approximately how many Mya newer extant clades radiated.

The following is the listing of the various simian families, and their placement in the order Primates:

- Order Primates
  - Suborder Strepsirrhini: nontarsier prosimians
  - Suborder Haplorhini: tarsiers and monkeys, including apes
    - Infraorder Tarsiiformes
    - Infraorder Simiiformes
      - Parvorder Platyrrhini: New World monkeys
        - Family Callitrichidae: marmosets and tamarins
        - Family Cebidae: capuchins and squirrel monkeys
        - Family Aotidae: night or owl monkeys (douroucoulis)
        - Family Pitheciidae: titis, sakis, and uakaris
        - Family Atelidae: howler, spider, and woolly monkeys
      - Parvorder Catarrhini
        - Superfamily Cercopithecoidea: Old World monkeys
          - Family Cercopithecidae
        - Superfamily Hominoidea
          - Family Hylobatidae: gibbons
          - Family Hominidae: great apes, including humans
      - †Amphipithecidae
      - †Eosimiidae
      - †Aseanpithecus

Below is a cladogram with some of the extinct simian species with the more modern species emerging within the Eosimiidae. The simians originated in Asia, while the crown simians were in Afro-Arabia. It is indicated approximately how many Mya the clades diverged into newer clades.

- Haplorhini (64)
  - Tarsiiformes
  - Simians (54)
    - Ekgmowechashalidae (39)
      - Muangthanhinius (†32 Mya)
      - (36)
        - Gatanthropus micros (†30)
        - Bugtilemur (†29)
      - Ekgmowechashala (†)
    - Eosimiidae (52)
      - Eosimiidae s.s.(50)
        - (45)
          - Eosimias (†40)
          - Phenacopithecus (†42)
        - (45)
          - Bahinia (†32)
          - Nosmips aenigmaticus (†37)
      - - Phileosimias (†28)
        - (48)
          - Amphipithecidae (†35)
          - (45)
            - Parapithecoidea
              - Parapithecidae (†30)
              - Proteopithecidae (†34)
            - Crown Simians (40)
              - Platyrrhini (35)
                - Perupithecus (†)
                - (30)
                  - (29)
                    - Chilecebus (†20)
                    - (26)
                      - Tremacebus (†20)
                      - (24)
                        - Homunculus (†16)
                        - Dolichocebus (†20)
                  - (28)
                    - Branisella (†26)
                    - Crown Platyrrhini (New World Monkeys)
              - Catarrhini

Usually the Ekgmowechashalidae are considered to be Strepsirrhini, not Haplorhini. A 2018 study places Eosimiidae as a sister to the crown haplorhini. In 2020 papers, the Proteopithecidae are part of the Parapithecoidea, and Nosmips aenigmaticus (previously in Eosimidae) is a basal simian. In a 2021 paper, the following basal simians were found:

- Simiiformes/ (58) Eosimiidae s.l.
  - (57)
    - Altiatlasius koulch (†57)
    - (48)
      - Nosmips aenigmaticum (†37)
      - (37)
        - Anthradapis vietnamensis (†37)
        - Ekgmowechashalidae (†28)
  - (56)
    - (17)
      - Dolichocebus annectens (†16)
      - Parvimico materdei (†16)
    - (54)
      - Eosimiidae s.s. (†41)
      - (48)
        - Bahinia (†33)
        - (45)
          - Phileosimias (†28)
          - higher Simians (incl. crown simians)

Dolichocebus annectens and Parvimico materdei would normally, given their South American location and their age and other factors, be considered Platyrrhini. The original Eosmiidae appear polyphyletic with Nosmips, Bahinia, and Phileosimias at different locations from other eosimians.

== See also ==
- Simia, Carl Linnaeus's original classification of these primates.
- wikt:simianization
