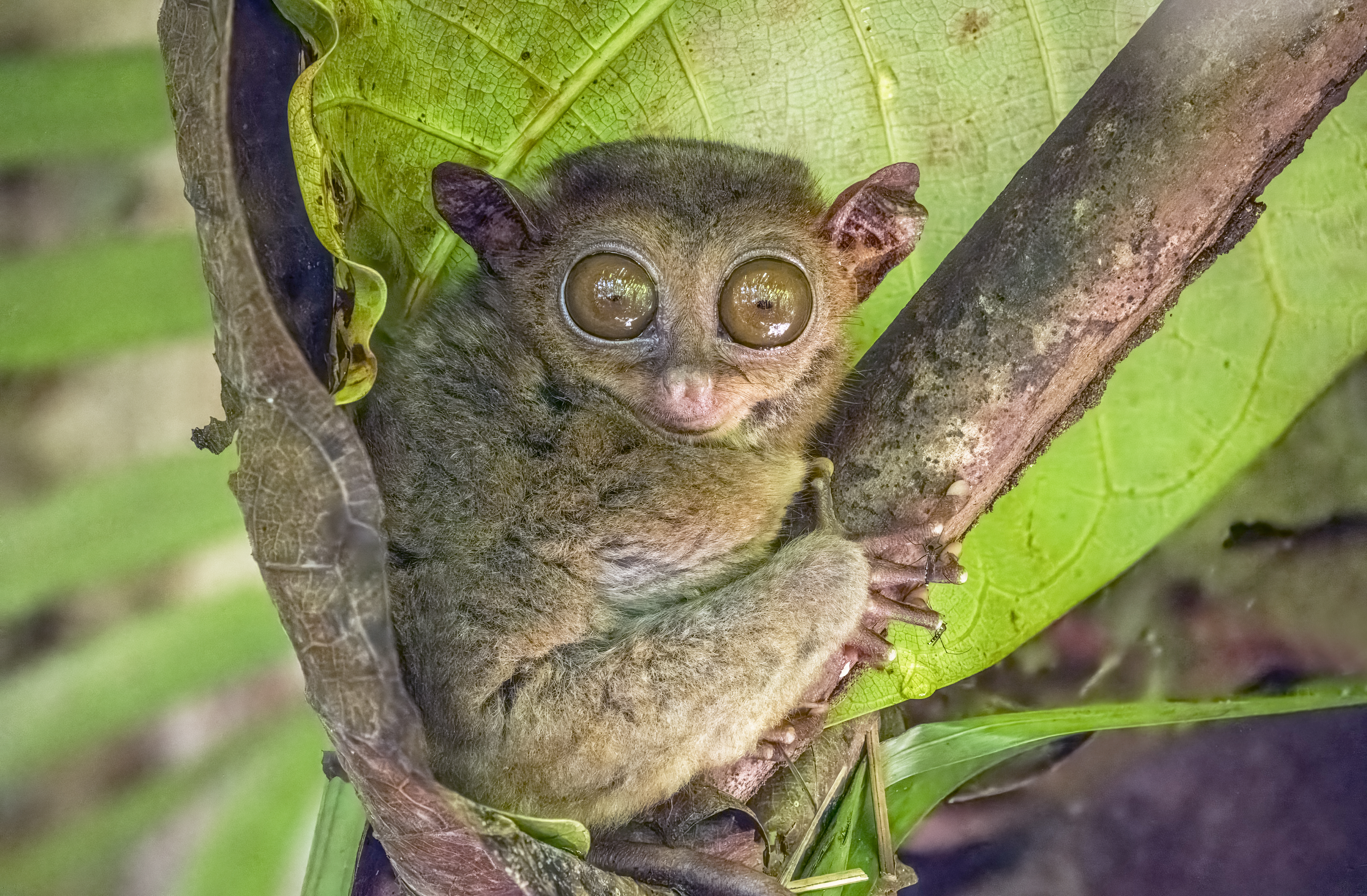
- Philippine tarsier (Carlito syrichta)

Scientific classification
- Kingdom: Animalia
- Phylum: Chordata
- Class: Mammalia
- Order: Primates
- Infraorder: Tarsiiformes
- Family: Tarsiidae; Gray, 1825

Type genus
- Tarsius Storr, 1780

Genera
- Carlito; Cephalopachus; Tarsius
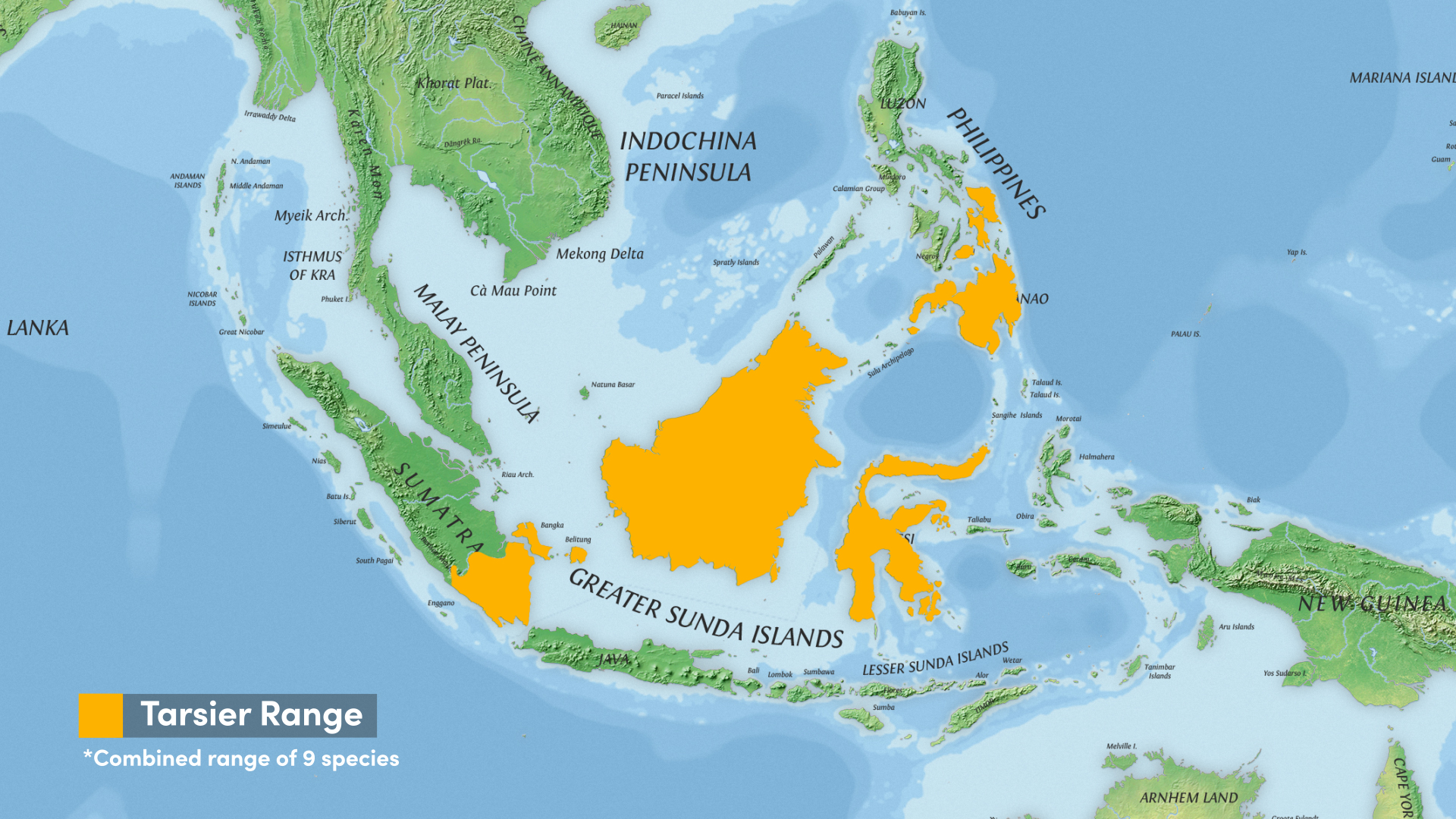
- Range of all tarsier species

= Tarsier =

Tarsiers Temporal range: 45–0 Ma Middle Eocene to recent

Family of dry-nosed primates

Tarsiers (/ˈtɑːrsiərz/ TAR-see-ərz) are haplorhine primates of the family Tarsiidae, which is the lone extant family within the infraorder Tarsiiformes. Although the group was prehistorically more globally widespread, all of the existing species are native to Maritime Southeast Asia, predominantly in Brunei, Indonesia, Malaysia and the Philippines.

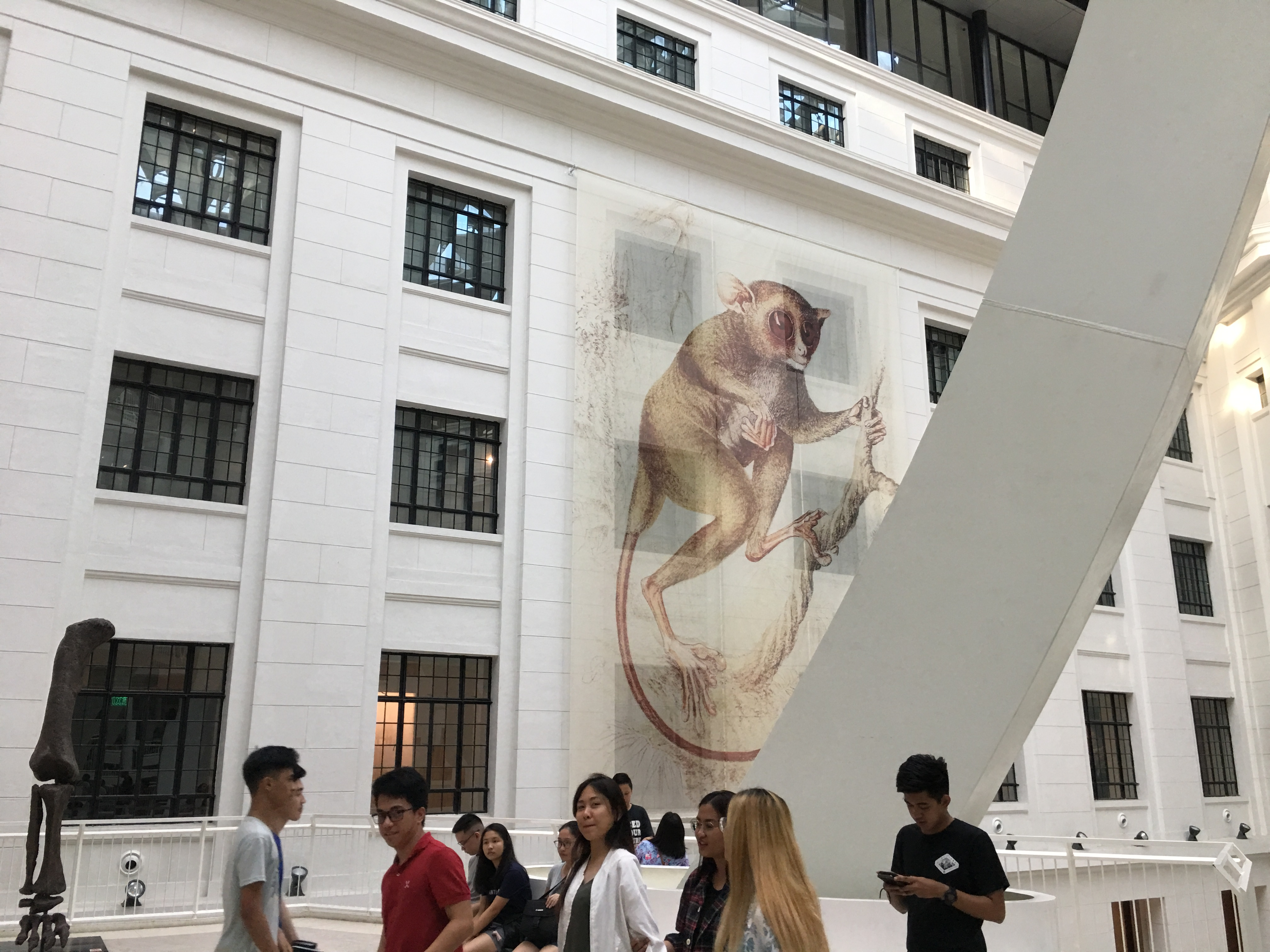
Tarsier image inside Philippine National Museum of Natural History

They are found primarily in forested habitats, especially forests that have liana, since the vine gives tarsiers vertical support when climbing trees.

== Evolutionary history ==
=== Fossil record ===
Fossils of tarsiiform primates have been found in other parts of Asia, (with disputed fossils from Northern Africa), but extant tarsiers are restricted to several Southeast Asian islands. The fossil record indicates that their dentition has not changed much, except in size, over the past 45 million years.

Within the family Tarsiidae, there are two extinct genera—Xanthorhysis and Afrotarsius; however, the placement of Afrotarsius is not certain, and it is sometimes listed in its own family, Afrotarsiidae, within the infraorder Tarsiiformes, or considered a simian (anthropoid) primate.

So far, four fossil species of tarsiers are known from the fossil record:

- Tarsius eocaenus is known from the Middle Eocene in China.
- Hesperotarsius thailandicus lived during the Early Miocene in northwestern Thailand.
- Hesperotarsius sindhensis lived during the Miocene in Pakistan.
- Tarsius sirindhornae lived during the Middle Miocene in northern Thailand.

The genus Tarsius has a longer fossil record than any other primate genus, but the assignment of the Eocene and Miocene fossils to the genus is dubious.

=== Classification ===
The phylogenetic position of extant tarsiers within the order Primates has been debated for much of the 20th century, and tarsiers have alternately been classified with strepsirrhine primates in the suborder Prosimii, or as the sister group to the simians (Anthropoidea) in the infraorder Haplorhini. Analysis of SINE insertions, a type of macromutation to the DNA, is argued to offer very persuasive evidence for the monophyly of Haplorhini, where other lines of evidence, such as DNA sequence data, remain ambiguous. Thus, some systematists argue the debate is conclusively settled in favor of a monophyletic Haplorrhini. In common with simians, tarsiers have a mutation in the L-gulonolactone oxidase (GULO) gene, which prevents their bodies from synthesizing vitamin C so they must find it in the diet. Since the strepsirrhines do not have this mutation and have retained the ability to make vitamin C, the genetic trait that confers the need for it in the diet would tend to place tarsiers with haplorhines.

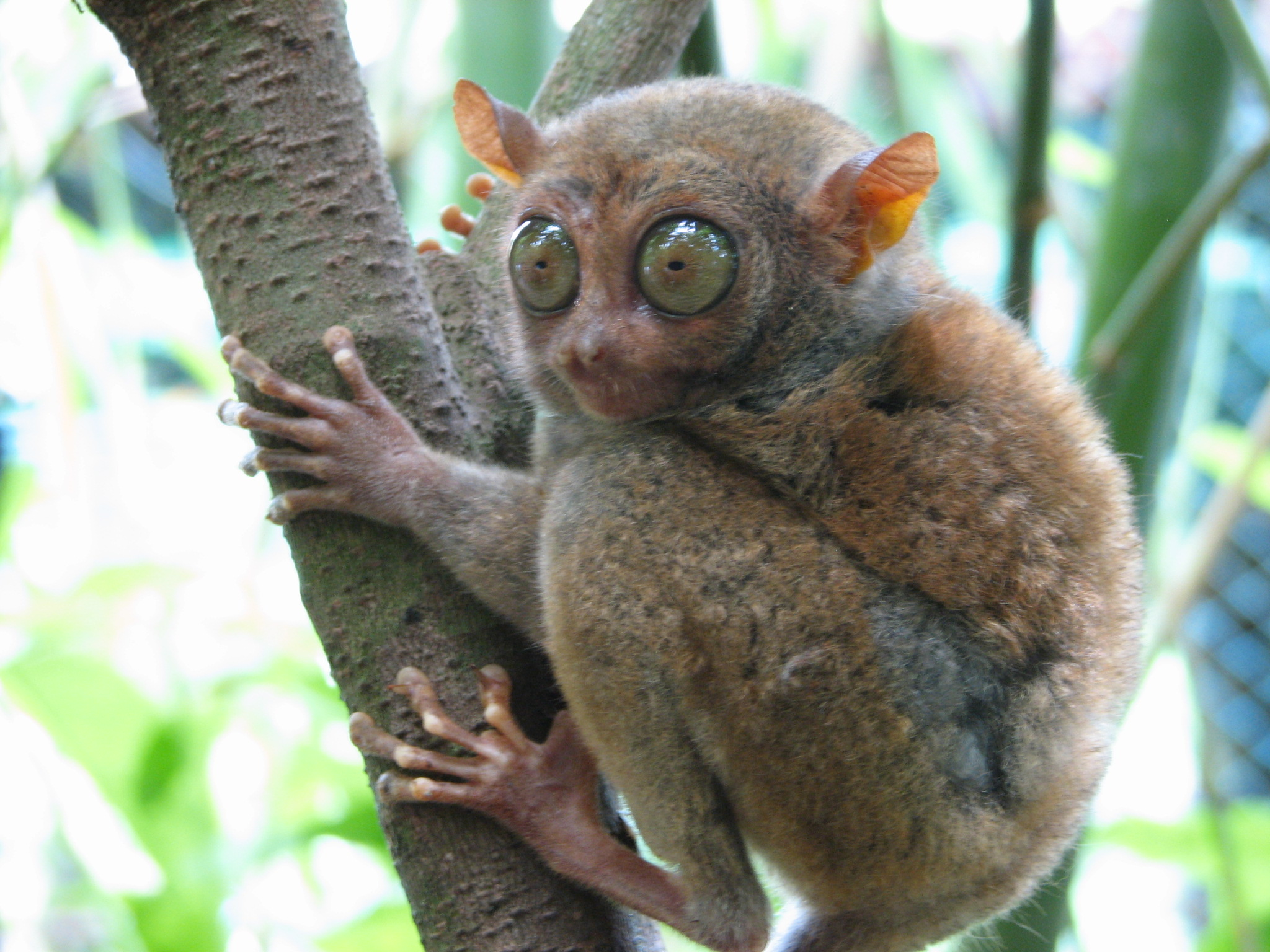
Philippine tarsier (Carlito syrichta), one of the smallest primates

At a lower phylogenetic level, the tarsiers have, until recently, all been placed in the genus Tarsius, while it was debated whether the species should be placed in two (a Sulawesi and a Philippine-western group) or three separate genera (Sulawesi, Philippine and western groups). Species level taxonomy is complex, with morphology often being of limited use compared to vocalizations. Further confusion existed over the validity of certain names. Among others, the widely used T. dianae has been shown to be a junior synonym of T. dentatus, and comparably, T. spectrum is now considered a junior synonym of T. tarsier.

In 2010, Colin Groves and Myron Shekelle suggested splitting the genus Tarsius into three genera, the Philippine tarsiers (genus Carlito), the western tarsiers (genus Cephalopachus), and the eastern tarsiers (genus Tarsius). This was based on differences in dentition, eye size, limb and hand length, tail tufts, tail sitting pads, the number of mammae, chromosome count, socioecology, vocalizations, and distribution. The senior taxon of the species, T. tarsier was restricted to the population of a Selayar island, which then required the resurrection of the defunct taxon T. fuscus.

In 2014, scientists published the results of a genetic study from across the range of the Philippine tarsier, revealing previously unrecognised genetic diversity. Three subspecies are recognised in the established taxonomy: Carlito syrichta syrichta from Leyte and Samar, C. syrichta fraterculus from Bohol, and C. syrichta carbonarius from Mindanao. Their analysis of mitochondrial and nuclear DNA sequences suggested that ssp. syrichta and fraterculus may represent a single lineage, whereas ssp. carbonarius may represent two lineages – one occupies the majority of Mindanao while the other is in northeastern Mindanao and the nearby Dinagat Island, which the authors termed the 'Dinagat-Caraga tarsier'. More detailed studies that integrate morphological data will be needed to review the taxonomy of tarsiers in the Philippines.

- Infraorder Tarsiiformes
  - Family Tarsiidae: tarsiers
    - Genus Carlito
      - Philippine tarsier, Carlito syrichta
        - C. s. syrichta
        - C. s. fraterculus (to be combined into C. s. syrichta?)
        - C. s. carbonarius
    - Genus Cephalopachus
      - Horsfield's tarsier, Cephalopachus bancanus
        - C. b. bancanus
        - C. b. natunensis
        - C. b. boreanus
        - C. b. saltator
    - Genus Tarsius
      - Dian's tarsier, T. dentatus
      - Makassar tarsier T. fuscus
      - Lariang tarsier, T. lariang
      - Niemitz's tarsier, T. niemitzi
      - Peleng tarsier, T. pelengensis
      - Sangihe tarsier, T. sangirensis
      - Gursky's spectral tarsier, T. spectrumgurskyae
      - Jatna's tarsier, T. supriatnai
      - Spectral tarsier, T. tarsier
      - Siau Island tarsier, T. tumpara
      - Pygmy tarsier, T. pumilus
      - Wallace's tarsier, T. wallacei

== Anatomy and physiology ==
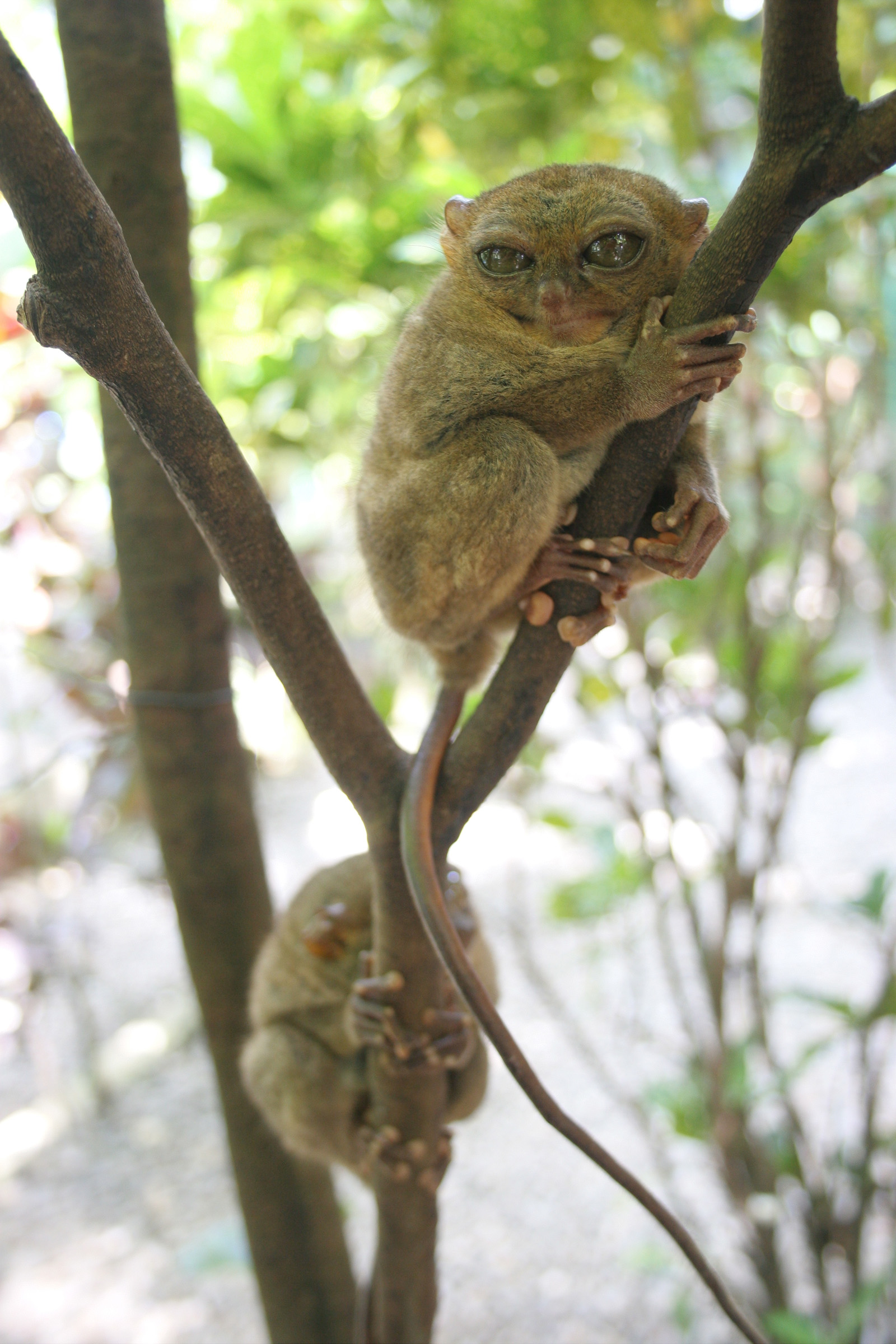
Tarsiers tree-climbing

Tarsiers are small animals with enormous eyes; each eyeball is approximately 16 millimetres (0.63 in) in diameter and is as large as, or in some cases larger than, its entire brain. The unique cranial anatomy of the tarsier results from the need to balance their large eyes and heavy head so they are able to wait silently for nutritious prey. Tarsiers have a strong auditory sense, and their auditory cortex is distinct. Tarsiers also have long hind limbs, owing mostly to the elongated tarsus bones of the feet, from which the animals get their name. The combination of their elongated tarsi and fused tibiofibulae makes them morphologically specialized for vertical clinging and leaping. The head and body range from 10 to 15 cm in length, but the hind limbs are about twice this long (including the feet), and they also have a slender tail from 20 to 25 cm long. Their fingers are also elongated, with the third finger being about the same length as the upper arm. Most of the digits have nails, but the second and third toes of the hind feet bear claws instead, which are used for grooming. Tarsiers have soft, velvety fur, which is generally buff, beige, or ochre in color.

Tarsier morphology allows for them to move their heads 180 degrees in either direction, allowing for them to see 360 degrees around them. Their 2.1.3.31.1.3.3 dental formula is also unique. Unlike many nocturnal vertebrates, tarsiers lack a light-reflecting layer (tapetum lucidum) of the retina and have a fovea.

The tarsier's brain is different from that of other primates in terms of the arrangement of the connections between the two eyes and the lateral geniculate nucleus, which is the main region of the thalamus that receives visual information. The sequence of cellular layers receiving information from the ipsilateral (same side of the head) and contralateral (opposite side of the head) eyes in the lateral geniculate nucleus distinguishes tarsiers from lemurs, lorises, and monkeys, which are all similar in this respect. Some neuroscientists suggested that "this apparent difference distinguishes tarsiers from all other primates, reinforcing the view that they arose in an early, independent line of primate evolution."

Philippine tarsiers are capable of hearing frequencies as high as 91 kHz. They are also capable of vocalizations with a dominant frequency of 70 kHz.

Unlike most primates, male tarsiers do not have bacula.

== Behavior ==
Pygmy tarsiers differ from other species in terms of their morphology, communication, and behavior. The differences in morphology that distinguish pygmy tarsiers from other species are likely based on their high altitude environment.

All tarsier species are nocturnal in their habits, but like many nocturnal organisms, some individuals may show more or less activity during the daytime. Based on the anatomy of all tarsiers, they are all adapted for leaping even though they all vary based on their species.

Ecological variation is responsible for differences in morphology and behavior in tarsiers because different species become adapted to local conditions based on the level of altitude. For example, the colder climate at higher elevations can influence cranial morphology.

Tarsiers tend to be extremely shy animals and are sensitive to bright lights, loud noises, and physical contact. They have been reported to behave suicidally when stressed or kept in captivity.

=== Predators ===
Due to their small size, tarsiers are prey to various other animals. Tarsiers primarily inhabit the lower vegetation layers as they face threats from both terrestrial predators such as cats, lizards, and snakes, and aerial predators such as owls. By residing in these lower layers, they can minimize their chances of being preyed upon by staying off the ground and yet still low enough to avoid birds of prey.

Tarsiers, though known as being shy and reclusive, are known to mob predators. In nature, mobbing is the act of harassing predators to reduce the chance of being attacked. When predators are near, tarsiers will make a warning vocalization. Other tarsiers will respond to the call, and within a short period of time, 2-10 tarsiers will show up to mob the predator. The majority of the group consists of adult males, but there will occasionally be a female or two. While tarsier groups only contain one adult male, males from other territories will join in the mob event, meaning there are multiple alpha male tarsiers attacking the predator.

=== Diet ===
Tarsiers are the only entirely carnivorous extant primates, albeit mainly insectivorous, catching invertebrates by jumping at them. The tarsiers also opportunistically prey on a variety of arboreal and small forest animals, including orthopterans, scarab beetles, small flying frogs, lizards and, occasionally, amphibious crabs that climb into the lower sections of trees. However, it has been found that their favorite prey are arthropods, beetles, arachnids, cockroaches, grasshoppers, katydids, cicadas, and walking sticks. Tarsiers are, rarely, also known to prey on baby birds, small tree snakes and even baby bats.

=== Reproduction ===
Gestation takes about six months, and tarsiers give birth to single offspring. Young tarsiers are born furred, and with open eyes, and are able to climb within a day of birth. They reach sexual maturity by the end of their second year. Sociality and mating system varies, with tarsiers from Sulawesi living in small family groups, while Philippine and western tarsiers are reported to sleep and forage alone.

== Conservation ==
Tarsiers have never formed successful breeding colonies in captivity; this may be due in part to their special feeding requirements.

A sanctuary near the town of Corella, on the Philippine island of Bohol, has had some success restoring tarsier populations. The Philippines Tarsier Foundation has developed a large, semi-wild enclosure known as the Tarsier Research and Development Center. Carlito Pizarras, also known as the "Tarsier man", founded the sanctuary, where visitors can observe tarsiers in the wild. The trees in the sanctuary are populated with nocturnal insects that make up the tarsier's diet.

The first quantitative study on the activity patterns of captive Philippine tarsiers (Tarsius syrichta) was conducted at the Subayon Conservation Centre for the Philippine Tarsier in Bilar, Bohol. From December 2014 to January 2016, female and male T. syrichta were observed based on their time apportioned to normal activities during non-mating versus mating seasons. During the non-mating season, a significant amount of their waking hours were spent scanning prior to resting, foraging, and traveling. Feeding, scent-marking, self-grooming, social activities, and other activities were minimal. Scanning was still a common activity among the paired sexes during mating season. However, resting markedly decreased, while increases in travel and foraging were evident.

The 2008-described Siau Island tarsier in Indonesia is regarded as critically endangered and was listed among The World's 25 Most Endangered Primates by Conservation International and the IUCN/SCC Primate Specialist Group in 2008. The Malaysian government protects tarsiers by listing them in the Totally Protected Animals of Sarawak, on the island of Borneo, where they are commonly found.
