= Phenacopithecus =

Phenacopithecus Temporal range: Bartonian

Scientific classification
- Kingdom: Animalia
- Phylum: Chordata
- Class: Mammalia
- Order: Primates
- Family: †Eosimiidae
- Genus: †Phenacopithecus; Beard & Wang, 2004

Type species
- Phenacopithecus xueshii Beard & Wang, 2004

Species
- Phenacopithecus xueshii; Phenacopithecus krishtalkai

Extinct genus of primates

Phenacopithecus is an extinct genus of eosimiid primate that inhabited China during the late middle Eocene.

== Distribution ==
Fossil remains of both P. xueshii and P. krishtalkai are known from the Heti Formation, located in the Yuanqu Basin.

== Morphology ==
The maxillary fragment of the holotype of Phenacopithecus krishtalkai indicates that eosimiids possessed a relatively small infraorbital foramen and a deep lower face, extending between the inferior orbital margin and the alveolar border. This morphology suggests that eosimiids lacked the orbital hypertrophy characteristic of living tarsiers and several fossil groups, including omomyids and microchoerids.

== Paleobiology ==
The relatively small orbits of eosimiids may indicate that they were primarily diurnal. The body mass of P. xueshii was estimated at 235 grams, and P. krishtalkai at 149.
