= Paleontology in Egypt =

Egypt has many fossil-bearing geologic formations, in which many dinosaurs have been discovered.

== Scientists ==
- Ernst Stromer
- Richard Markgraf, early 1900s, (he died in Sinnuris of Faiyum in 1916)
- A. B. Orlebar, Fayoum 1845
- George Schweinfurth, Geziret al-Qarn in Lake Qarun 1879 & Qasr al-Sagha Formation ancient whale fossils named Zeuglodom osiris.
- Hugh Beadnell, Fayoum 1898
- Charles Andrews, 1901, they unearthed a wealth of fossils Palaeomastodon, the oldest known elephant
- Eberhard Frass, Fayoum 1905
- Walter Granger & Henry F. Osborn, Fayoum 1907
- Wendell Phillips, 1947
- Elwyn L. Simons, Fayoum 1961–1986
- Thomas M. Bown and David Tab Rasmussen, 1980s
- Hesham Sallam

== Fossils ==
=== Petrified Wood ===
Fayoum, Petrified wood protectorate in New-Cairo Area/ Cairo-Suez desert road & entire Western Desert of Egypt is covered in Petrified wood.

The presence of this petrified wood serves as an indicator of a former tropical climate within the region. The deposits exhibit significant taxonomic diversity and high visual preservation, with specimens frequently exposed at the surface across specific locations.

=== Reptiles ===
- Turtle fossils in Fayoum
  - Testudo ammon, a large land tortoise
  - Podocnemis blanckenhorni river turtle
  - Stereogenys pelomedusa tropical land turtles
- Gigantic snake fossils found in the Qasr al-Sagha Formation.
  - Gigantophis
  - Pterosphernus
- Tomistoma, a crocodile type animal.
- Wadisuchus kassabi, earliest known Dyrosauridae

=== Birds ===
The area of Uganda bordering Lake Victoria and the upper Nile River area is not unlike the climate of the Fayoum long ago, where many bird fossils have been discovered.

- ospreys (Pandionidae)
- Gigantic shoebilled stork (Balaenicipitidae)
- jacanas, sometimes called lily-trotters (Jacanidae)
- herons, egrets, rails (Rallidae)
- cranes (Gruidae)
- flamingos (Phoenicopteridae)
- storks (Ciconiidae)
- cormorants (Phalacrocoracidae)
- An ancient eagle named Accipitridae

=== Mammals ===
- large Hyrax (Megalohyrax oecaenus)
- Fayoum's whale or Zeuglodon or more precisely the Basilosaurus in Fayoum's Wadi Zeuglodon (or wadi al-Hitan, Whale Valley)
- Another whale in Wadi Zeuglodon is the Dorudon
- Primitive whale from Fayum Depression Phiomicetus
- Arsinoitherium, a rhinoceros like animal with two horns
  - Arsinoitherium zitteli
  - Arsinoitherium andrewsi
- Elephants (mastodons) in Fayoum
  - Moeritherium in Fayoum, and in Wadi El Natrun
  - Palaeomastodon
  - Phiomia
- Apterodon
- Pterodon
- Hyaenodon
- Sirenia (Sea Cow)

==== Primates ====
The Fayoum primates

- The Lower sequence primates
  - Oligopithecus savagei
  - Qatrania wingi
- The upper sequence primates
  - Catopithecus browni
  - Proteopitheus sylvia
  - Oligopithecus
  - Apidium moustafai
  - Apidium phiomense
- Parapithecus fraasi
- Parapithecus grangeri
- Aegyptopithecus zeuxis
- Propliopithecus, (P. chirobates, P. ankeli, P. haeckeli and P. markgrafi)

== Dinosaurs ==
- Aegyptosaurus
- Bahariasaurus
- Carcharodontosaurus
- Deltadromeus
- Igai
- Inosaurus
- Mansourasaurus
- Paralititan
- Spinosaurus
- Tameryraptor

== Fossil sites ==
- Wadi Al-Hitan
- Bahariya Formation
- Jebel Qatrani Formation
- Nubian Sandstone
- Qasr el Sagha Formation
- Upper Cretaceous Phosphates
- Variegated Shale
- Madwar al-Bighal
- Moghra Oasis

== See also ==
- List of African dinosaurs
