= Abuqatrania =

Abuqatrania Temporal range: Late Eocene–Early Oligocene

Scientific classification
- Kingdom: Animalia
- Phylum: Chordata
- Class: Mammalia
- Order: Primates
- Family: †Parapithecidae
- Genus: †Abuqatrania; Simons et al., 2001
- Species: †A. basiodontos

Binomial name
- †Abuqatrania basiodontos Simons et al., 2001

Synonyms
- Qatrania basiodontos

Extinct genus of primates

Abuqatrania is an extinct genus of parapithecid primates known from the Paleogene of North Africa. It was established in 2001 by Elwyn L. Simons, Erik R. Seiffert, Prithijit S. Chatrath and Yousry Attia for the type species Abuqatrania basiodontos, based on fossils from the late Eocene of the Fayum Depression in Egypt.

Its taxonomic status has been debated, as some authors have treated it as a synonym of the related genus Qatrania. In 2024, isolated teeth from the earliest Oligocene of southern Morocco were tentatively referred to Abuqatrania cf. basiodontos.

== Discovery and occurrence ==
The original fossils of Abuqatrania basiodontos came from Quarry L-41 in the Jebel Qatrani Formation of the Fayum Depression, northern Egypt. The species was described as a late Eocene anthropoid and provided evidence for the presence of Parapithecidae in the oldest productive vertebrate-bearing deposits of the formation.

A second, tentative occurrence was reported in 2024 from the Samlat Formation in the Dakhla region of southern Morocco, near the northern border of Mauritania. The material comes from locality DAK C2, in the uppermost part of the formation along the Atlantic margin of the Rio de Oro, east of the Dakhla peninsula. The fossil-bearing deposits date to the earliest Oligocene, approximately 33.5 million years ago. The specimens were recovered from estuarine sediments using wet-screening techniques.

== Description ==
The original description characterized Abuqatrania basiodontos as a parapithecid with no clear autapomorphies, or derived characteristics exclusive to the species. Its most parsimonious phylogenetic interpretation placed it as the sister taxon of a clade containing Qatrania, Parapithecus and Apidium.

Body mass estimates for specimens tentatively assigned to Abuqatrania cf. basiodontos range from approximately 371 to 561 grams. These estimates were calculated from the dimensions of an isolated first lower molar and an isolated third lower molar from the earliest Oligocene of Morocco. This mass range is similar to that of New World Monkeys of the genus Callithrix.

The Moroccan material referred to Abuqatrania cf. basiodontos consists of isolated teeth rather than an associated skeleton. The published specimen records include a lower canine, lower molars, an upper molar identified as either the first or second molar, a lower incisor tentatively identified as either the first or second incisor, two lower second premolars and an upper third molar. Some of the teeth are worn, corroded or broken.

== Taxonomic history ==
Simons and colleagues established Abuqatrania as a distinct genus in 2001. They interpreted A. basiodontos as closely related to other early parapithecids, particularly a clade containing Qatrania, Parapithecus and Apidium.

In their review of Paleogene anthropoids, Seiffert and colleagues (2010) recognized Abuqatrania separately from Qatrania. They also discussed the possibility that Abuqatrania basiodontos was close to the ancestry of other parapithecids, noting that its fossils were approximately one million years older than those of Qatrania wingi.

The distinction between Abuqatrania and Qatrania was not accepted by all authors. In 2013, K. Christopher Beard treated Abuqatrania as a synonym of Qatrania, using the combination Qatrania basiodontos for the species. Under this classification, the species belongs to the same genus as Qatrania wingi and Qatrania fleaglei.

The name has continued to be used in subsequent scientific literature. Marivaux and colleagues (2024), for example, tentatively assigned the Moroccan material to Abuqatrania cf. basiodontos.

== Paleobiogeography ==
The Moroccan locality DAK C2 preserves a diverse primate community from the Eocene–Oligocene transition. Marivaux and colleagues identified at least eight primate species, including anthropoids assigned to Oligopithecidae, Propliopithecidae, Parapithecidae and Afrotarsiidae, as well as several strepsirrhine groups.

Comparisons between the primates and rodents from Dakhla and those from the Jebel Qatrani Formation in Egypt led the authors to propose that an east–west environmental connection existed across North Africa during the latest Eocene and earliest Oligocene. They also suggested that tropical habitats along the northwestern margin of Africa may have acted as refuges during the cooling associated with the Eocene–Oligocene transition. These interpretations concern the broader fossil assemblage and its environment, rather than Abuqatrania alone.
