= Proteopithecus =

Proteopithecus Temporal range: Priabonian, 34.8-33.7 Ma

Scientific classification
- Kingdom: Animalia
- Phylum: Chordata
- Class: Mammalia
- Order: Primates
- Family: †Proteopithecidae
- Genus: †Proteopithecus; Simons, 1989
- Species: †P. sylviae

Binomial name
- †Proteopithecus sylviae Simons, 1989

Extinct genus of primates

Proteopithecus is an extinct genus of early anthropoid primates that lived in Egypt during the late Eocene. The genus has only one species, Proteopithecus sylviae.

It is known from Quarry L-41 in the Fayum Depression based on cranial and postcranial fossils.

== Discovery ==
The fossils of Proteopithecus were discovered in 1987 and 1988 at Quarry L-41, located near the base of the Jebel Qatrani Formation in the Fayum Depression of Egypt.

The genus was formally described by Elwyn L. Simons in 1989, based on a left maxillary specimen (CGM 41886). At the time, it was classified alongside Catopithecus and Oligopithecus in the subfamily Oligopithecinae of the family Propliopithecidae.

Other discoveries provided more material. In 1997, these discoveries were used to establish the family Proteopithecidae, separating Proteopithecus from other simians found in the Fayum.

=== Naming ===
The generic name Proteopithecus derives from the Greek prōtos (first or foremost) and píthēkos (ape). The specific epithet sylviae honours Sylvia Cornero, an Argentine anthropologist who discovered the type specimen.

== Description ==
Proteopithecus was a small-bodied primate. Its skull has a relatively broad, rounded braincase, elongated nasal bones, and a lacrimal bone positioned within the orbit. The temporal lines converge towards a small sagittal crest at the rear of the skull.

Its dentition has three premolars in each quadrant, with a dental formula of 2.1.3.3. The upper molars have distinct hypocones on the first and second molars, while the first upper molar also bears a paraconule. A hypocone-like cusp is present on the fourth upper premolar.

Differences in canine size among specimens have been investigated as evidence of sexual dimorphism. A study of Egyptian Eocene anthropoids discussed variation in canine size in Proteopithecus and Catopithecus.

== Paleobiology ==
Proteopithecus sylviae showed sexual dimorphism in canine size, something not known among extant primates of similar body size.

Body mass has been estimated at 250 grams. Its ecology and cranium suggested an arboreal lifestyle, diurnal activity and a diet consisting of fruit and insects.

Proteopithecus was the first Eocene anthropoid for which postcranial fossils were described. Its hindlimb resembles that of platyrrhines and suggests adaptations for running and pronograde quadrupedal leaping.

The canine dimorphism has been thought to be evidence for a polygynous mating system and male-male competition.

== Classification ==
The evolutionary relationships of Proteopithecus remain uncertain. Its dental morphology was initially interpreted as resembling that of platyrrhines, the group comprising modern New World monkeys, leading to the suggestion that proteopithecids might be near the base that produced them.

A 2001 review of dental evidence regarded Proteopithecus sylviae as of uncertain familial affinity.

A 2013 study of the calcaneus attributed to Proteopithecus found similarities with the foot bones of parapithecoids, an extinct group of anthropoids. Its phylogenetic analysis supported a placement of Proteopithecidae as the sister group of Parapithecoidea, although the authors noted that anatomical similarities may reflect shared ancestry or convergent evolution.
