= Yaowalak Chaimanee =

Thai vertebrate palaeontologist

Yaowalak Chaimanee is a Thai vertebrate palaeontologist who specialises in studying Cenozoic faunas of Southeast Asia and Africa.

== Research ==
Chaimanee has described a number of new species over her career. Below is a list of taxa that Chaimanee has contributed to naming:

Year	Taxon	Authors
2026	Saharopithecus salemi gen. et sp. nov.	Jaeger, Chaimanee, Benammi, Marivaux, Chavasseau, Beard, Valentin, Hlal, Bilal, Coster, & Brunet
2026	Yakamys sirindhornae gen. et sp. nov.	Chaimanee, Marivaux, Millien, Yamee, Tian, & Jaeger
2021	Simonsius harujensis sp. nov.	Mattingly, Beard, Coster, Salem, Chaimanee, & Jaeger
2020	Africtis sirtensis gen. et sp. nov.	Mattingly, Beard, Coster, Salem, Chaimanee, & Jaeger
2016	Apidium zuetina sp. nov.	Beard, Coster, Salem, Chaimanee, & Jaeger
2012	Apterodon langebadreae sp. nov.	Grohé, Morlo, Chaimanee, Blondel, Coster, Valentin, Salem, Bilal, Jaeger, & Brunet
2011	Tarsius sirindhornae sp. nov.	Chaimanee, Lebrun, Yamee, & Jaeger
