= Saharopithecus =

Saharopithecus Temporal range: Bartonian, 39-38 Ma

Scientific classification
- Kingdom: Animalia
- Phylum: Chordata
- Class: Mammalia
- Order: Primates
- Genus: †Saharopithecus
- Species: †S. salemi

Binomial name
- †Saharopithecus salemi Jaeger et al., 2026

Extinct genus of anthropoid primate

Saharopithecus (Note: The binomial name Saharopithecus salemi translates to 'Dr. Mustapha Salem's Sahara ape,' derived from the Sahara Desert, the Greek píthēkos ('ape'), and a tribute to Libyan geologist Mustapha Salem.) is an extinct genus of anthropoid primate that lived in Africa during the Bartonian stage of the Eocene epoch. It was described in June 2026, based on two upper molars found in what is now the Sahara desert.

== Description ==
The molars have rounded bumps on their chewing surfaces and an unusually rectangular shape. Each tooth has a large main bump (protocone), a smaller additional bump (hypocone), an extra bump (pericone), several tiny side bumps (conules), and a thin raised ridge (prehypocrista).

Due to their tiny size (2.03 millimeters long by 3.53 millimeters wide), they were analyzed using Micro-CT scans.

=== Paleobiology ===
Saharopithecus was relatively small-bodied.

== Classification ==
It is uncertain what family it belongs to. It is closely related to Proteopithecus, suggesting it might belong to Proteopithecidae. Together with Proteopithecus, it falls outside the clade of African parapithecoids. Alternatively, some of its tooth features suggest it could be an early relative of Propliopithecidae.

== Ecology and distribution ==
Saharopithecus salemi lived during the late middle Eocene, around 39–38 million years ago, in what is now the Dur At-Talah escarpment of central Libya. Its fossils come from the upper part of the New Idam Unit, including localities 2 and 4.

The sediments at Dur At-Talah record a transition from marine environments to river and delta systems. The fossil-bearing layers formed in an area influenced by both marine and freshwater conditions. The wider vertebrate fauna includes freshwater fish, turtles, crocodiles, rodents, bats, hyracoids and other mammals.

Saharopithecus lived alongside other primates, including the anthropoids Biretia piveteaui, Talahpithecus parvus and Afrotarsius libycus, as well as the early strepsirrhine Karanisia arenula. With at least four known anthropoid taxa, Dur At-Talah is currently the most taxonomically diverse Bartonian anthropoid locality known in Afro-Arabia.
