= Ucayalipithecus =

Ucayalipithecus Temporal range: Oligocene, 29.6-25 Ma

Scientific classification
- Kingdom: Animalia
- Phylum: Chordata
- Class: Mammalia
- Order: Primates
- Family: †Parapithecidae
- Genus: †Ucayalipithecus; Seiffert et al., 2020
- Species: †U. perdita

Binomial name
- †Ucayalipithecus perdita Seiffert et al., 2020

Extinct genus of primates from Peru

Ucayalipithecus is an extinct genus of parapithecid primates known from the Oligocene of the Peruvian Amazon. It is represented by four fossil molars discovered at the Santa Rosa locality in the Ucayali Region of eastern Peru. The genus and its only known species, Ucayalipithecus perdita, were described in 2020.

Phylogenetic analysis placed Ucayalipithecus among the parapithecids, an extinct group of anthropoid primates otherwise known from Afro-Arabia. Its presence in South America was interpreted as evidence of a separate dispersal of primates from Africa to South America, independent of the lineage that gave rise to modern New World monkeys.

== Description ==
The estimated body mass of U. perdita, calculated from the area of its lower second molar, ranges from approximately 319 to 366 grams. This estimate is comparable to the size of small living marmosets belonging to the genus Callithrix.

The teeth exhibit several features characteristic of parapithecids. The upper molars have bulbous, basally inflated cusps, restricted trigon basins, well-developed conules and prominent accessory cusps. Their morphology differs from that of early platyrrhine monkeys, supporting the classification of Ucayalipithecus as a parapithecid.

The bunodont dentition of Ucayalipithecus resembles that of contemporary African parapithecids, which have been interpreted as primarily frugivorous (fruit-eating).

== Discovery and material ==
The fossils were recovered from the Santa Rosa locality, a Fluvial deposit exposed along the left bank of the Río Yurúa in the Department of Ucayali, Peru. The locality also yielded fossils of other mammals, including the early primate Perupithecus, as well as rodents, marsupials and other vertebrates.

Two upper molars assigned to Ucayalipithecus perdita were identified by researchers in material recovered during earlier fieldwork. When paleontologist Erik Seiffert examined the teeth in 2016, he recognized similarities to those of parapithecid primates from Egypt. An expedition to Santa Rosa that year recovered two additional teeth, providing further evidence for the identification of a new genus and species.

The holotype of U. perdita is a lower second molar catalogued as CPI-7936 in the paleontological collection of the Instituto Geológico, Minero y Metalúrgico (INGEMMET) in Lima. Three additional teeth were assigned to the species: a partial right upper first molar (CPI-7937), a partial left upper second molar (CPI-7938), and a lower left third molar (CPI-7928).

The genus and species were formally described by Erik R. Seiffert and colleagues in 2020 in the journal Science.

=== Etymology ===
The generic name Ucayalipithecus combines Ucayali, referring to the Peruvian department where the fossils were discovered, with the Greek word píthēkos, meaning "monkey". The specific epithet perdita is Latin for "lost".

== Paleobiogeography ==
The closest known relatives of Ucayalipithecus occur in the fossil record of northern Africa, particularly the Fayum region of Egypt. Its presence in the Peruvian Amazon therefore provides evidence that parapithecids had reached South America during the Paleogene.

Based on their phylogenetic dating analysis, Seiffert and colleagues estimated that the lineage leading to Ucayalipithecus diverged from its African relative approximately 35.1 million years ago. They proposed that the dispersal to South America occurred between approximately 35.1 and 31.7 million years ago.

The proposed route required the ancestors of Ucayalipithecus to cross the Atlantic Ocean, which was still more than 1,500 kilometres wide in the relevant region. The researchers suggested that the animals may have travelled on natural rafts of floating vegetation detached from coastlines, possibly during storms. Lower sea levels around the Eocene–Oligocene transition may have shortened the crossing, although the exact circumstances of the dispersal remain uncertain.

The proposal is consistent with the broader evidence for Paleogene mammalian dispersal between Africa and South America. However, the fossil material does not establish the precise route taken by the animals or the duration of their journey.

== Classification ==
Seiffert and colleagues placed Ucayalipithecus within the family Parapithecidae and the superfamily Parapithecoidea. Their Bayesian phylogenetic analysis identified the Egyptian parapithecid Qatrania wingi as its closest known relative, with the two taxa forming a sister-group relationship in the resulting phylogeny.

The analysis also supported a distinction between Parapithecoidea and the clade containing living anthropoids, including Platyrrhini and Catarrhini. Consequently, Ucayalipithecus was interpreted as representing an independent anthropoid lineage that reached South America.

The discovery added another African-origin primate lineage to the fossil record of South America. Science News discussed the fossils as evidence for a second primate dispersal across the Atlantic, separate from the dispersal associated with the ancestors of living New World monkeys. A contemporary commentary in Science also discussed the proposed transatlantic crossing and its paleobiogeographic implications.

== Age ==
The original description assigned the Santa Rosa locality to the upper Eocene or lower Oligocene. Using Bayesian tip-dating, Seiffert and colleagues estimated a mean age of approximately 31.7 million years for U. perdita, placing it within the early Oligocene under their model.

A subsequent study published in 2021 investigated the age of the Santa Rosa fossil locality using zircon dating and phylogenetic analyses. Campbell and colleagues reported a maximum composite age of 29.6 ± 0.08 million years for the locality, which they interpreted as early Oligocene. They also reported zircon dates from the upper Oligocene.

The youngest individual zircon reported in the study yielded an age estimate of 25 ± 1.67 million years. The authors preferred the 29.6 ± 0.08 million-year composite estimate as the best maximum age for the deposits, based on the statistical population of the youngest zircon dates.

These estimates concern the age of the fossil-bearing sediments rather than direct radiometric dates of the teeth themselves. The revised chronology places the Santa Rosa fauna within the Oligocene and challenges earlier proposals that the locality's fossils were Eocene in age.
