= Proteopithecidae =

Proteopithecidae Temporal range: Bartonian–Rupelian

Scientific classification
- Kingdom: Animalia
- Phylum: Chordata
- Class: Mammalia
- Order: Primates
- Infraorder: Simiiformes
- Family: †Proteopithecidae; Simons 1997

Genera
- †Proteopithecus; †Saharopithecus (?); †Serapia

Extinct family of primates

Proteopithecidae is an extinct family of primates which lived in the Priabonian (late Eocene) and probably early Oligocene periods. Fossils that have been found are in the Jebel Qatrani Formation in Egypt.

Proteopithecus sylviae is unusual in having a large degree of sexual dimorphism of the canine teeth, which is unknown in extant primates of a similar (relatively small) size. It was arboreal, possibly diurnal, with a diet of fruit and insects. It weighed around 250 grams. It was the first Eocene anthropoid for which postcranial remains were found. The hindlimbs are similar to those of platyrrhines and indicates an animal that would do a considerable amount of running and pronograde (four limbed) leaping.

== Classification ==
Seiffert et al. (2010) note that Simons, the discoverer of Serapia originally placed it within the Parapithecidae, but in 2001 transferred Serapia to the Proteopithecidae, a view supported by Gunnell and Miller (2001), Beard (2002), and Seiffert et al. (2004 & 2005a). Kay and Williams (2013, edited by Feagle and Kay) continue to place Serapia in the parapithecidae as part of a proposed sub-family, Qatraniinae, alongside Arsinoea and Qatrania (they note these all share similar dental features to each other, but they are more primitive than other parapithecidae they also note that the similarity may be because of shared lineage rather than being closely related).
