= Monkey drive =

Monkey extermination for pest control

A monkey drive is an operation where large numbers of wild monkeys are rounded up and killed in order to protect crops such as rice, banana and citrus trees. Monkey drives have been reported in Sierra Leone, where they were supported by the government.

In 1965, Gerald Durrell organised a monkey drive in Sierra Leone during a collecting mission for Jersey Zoo (formerly the Durrell Wildlife Park). The monkey drive was out of season, and not to exterminate monkeys, but in order to capture colobus monkeys. In his book on the expedition, published in 1972, he wrote that 2000 to 3000 monkeys are killed in monkey drives in Sierra Leone each year, including the "two species" of colobus monkeys, which do no damage to cocoa plantations, and were theoretically protected by law. The species mentioned by Durrell are now considered genera: black-and-white colobus and red-and-black colobus.
