= Arsinoea =

Arsinoea Temporal range: Rupelian, 33.9–28.1 Ma

Scientific classification
- Domain: Eukaryota
- Kingdom: Animalia
- Phylum: Chordata
- Class: Mammalia
- Order: Primates
- Suborder: Haplorhini
- Infraorder: Simiiformes
- Family: †Parapithecidae
- Genus: †Arsinoea; Simons, 1992
- Species: †A. kallimos

Binomial name
- †Arsinoea kallimos Simons, 1992

Extinct genus of primates

Arsinoea is an extinct genus of primates of which there is one known species, Arsinoea kallimos. Arsinoea kallimos from the late Eocene quarry L-41, Fayum Depression.
