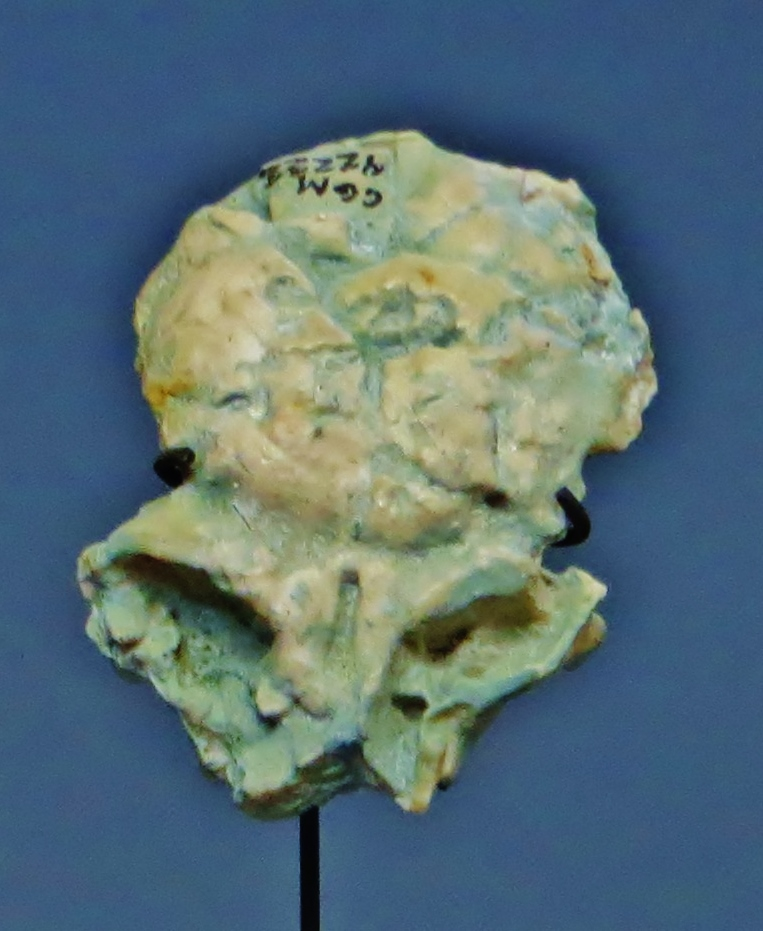
- Catopithecus, Musee d'Histoire Naturelle, Paris

Scientific classification
- Kingdom: Animalia
- Phylum: Chordata
- Class: Mammalia
- Order: Primates
- Family: †Oligopithecidae
- Genus: †Catopithecus; Simons 1989
- Species: †C. browni

Binomial name
- †Catopithecus browni Simons 1989

= Catopithecus =

Catopithecus Temporal range: Late Eocene

Genus of primates

Catopithecus is an early catarrhine fossil. It is a monotypic genus known from more than 16 specimens of a single species, Catopithecus browni, found in the Jebel Qatrani Formation of the Faiyum Governorate, Egypt.

The Jebel Qatrani Formation has been divided into two main faunal zones based on the fact that the fauna found in the lower portion of the quarry appear to be more primitive than those found in the upper section. The upper zone has been dated to older than 31 ± 1 myr based on the dating of a basalt layer that lies immediately above the formation and Nicolas Steno's Law of Superposition.

The lower zone contains the late Eocene green shale unit called Locality-41 (L-41) in which all the specimens of Catopithecus browni have been found. The relative dating of L-41 based on paleomagnetic correlations places it at 36 Myr according to Simons et al (1999), but Seiffert (2006) suggests this should be revised to 34.8-33.9 Myr.

== Etymology ==
The name comes from the Greek elements cato meaning "below" and pithekos meaning "one who plays tricks" (an ape), so Catopithecus means "below (before) ape". The species name, browni, is from the discoverer of the type specimen, Mark Brown.

== Description ==
The type specimen of C. browni, CGM 41885, is a right mandible discovered in 1987 by Mark Brown. The mandible was found with intact molars 1-3, and premolars 3-4, and alveoli are present for a canine tooth and incisors 1-2, indicating a lower dental formula of 2.1.2.3. This dental formula was demonstrated to reflect the upper (maxillary) dental formula in specimen DPC 8701 which was discovered in L-41 in 1988. At least 17 specimens, including six almost intact skulls, have been described and are listed below:

Skulls: DPC 8701, CGM 42222, DPC 11388, DPC 11594, DPC 12367, and CGM 41900 Mandibles and other fragments: DPC 7339, 7340, 7341, 7342, 8772, 9869, 11434, 11541, 11638, and DPC 11943

Analyses of the skull specimens show that C. browni had post-orbital closure developed to the degree seen in extant anthropoids. The orbit to skull size ratio of the C. browni skulls were compared to ratios of modern nocturnal and diurnal anthropoids in Rasmussen and Simmons (1992) and demonstrated that C. browni was most likely diurnal. The interorbital distance of the skulls was also compared to five taxa of modern primates in Rasmussen and Simons (1992), and demonstrated that C. browni had an interorbital distance range comparing it most closely to those of modern prosimians and callitrichids.

In contrast to extant anthropoids that express a fused mandibular symphysis, the mandibular symphysis of C. browni was observed to be unfused but covered in small rugose features in at least seven specimens.

The dentition of C. browni shows well developed crests on the buccal side (nearest to the cheek) of the tooth which is indicative of a folivorous and/or insectivorous diet, both of which require teeth expressing the cutting edges seen on the molars of C. browni. The three molars of C. browni decrease in size posteriorly, meaning that M1>M2>M3. Allometric molar size regressions were used to calculate an estimated weight range of 600-900 g for C. browni. Both upper and lower canines were observed to be relatively large and long compared to the adjacent spatulate, and vertically placed incisors which are all features of modern anthropoids. Unusually for a catarrhine, the M_{3} of Catopithecus erupted before the P_{4}.

The size of the olfactory bulb was measured as 4–5 mm long and 4 mm wide from specimen DPC 11434, a piece of fragmented frontal bone, using a latex mold of the outline of the imprinted braincase. Compared to the size of its cranium, this large olfactory bulb indicates a higher reliance on olfactory than visual senses, a feature not shared with modern anthropoids. The same specimen preserved a cross section of the ectotympanic ring, showing it to be an annular structure which was fused to the margin of the bulla similar in structure to modern platyrrhines.

CGM 42222 is the specimen in which the outline of the braincase was best preserved. After adjusting for potential distortion caused by crushing, a brain model was prepared that determining the approximate volume of the brain of CGM 42222 to be 3.1 cm^{3} ± 10%.4 Using the estimations of brain volume and body weight an encephalization quotient (EQ) was calculated that showed the brain volume to body size ratio of C. browni is small compared to extant anthropoids of similar weight.

== Habitat ==
Floral and faunal fossils associated with oligopithecine specimens suggest that Catopithecus and other oligopithecines inhabited wet, warm, forested and swampy, tropical environments.

== Conclusions ==
C. browni is a morphologically primitive anthropoid which occurred near the base of the catarrhine radiation. Its primitive features include an unfused mandibular symphysis, relatively large olfactory bulbs, small brain size, and large dentition compared to face and braincase. C. browni expresses notable derived anthropoid and catarrhine traits including an "anthropoidea-like" auditory region, a reduction in the number of premolars per quadrant of both the maxilla and mandible, and the degree of observed postorbital closure. These features have led to a general agreement on the phylogenetic affinity of Catopithecus as a sister taxon of propliopithecine catarrhines.

Claims of "substantial sexual dimorphism" have been made by several scientists. However, it is an extremely difficult claim to confirm as a result of the small sample size analyzed.
