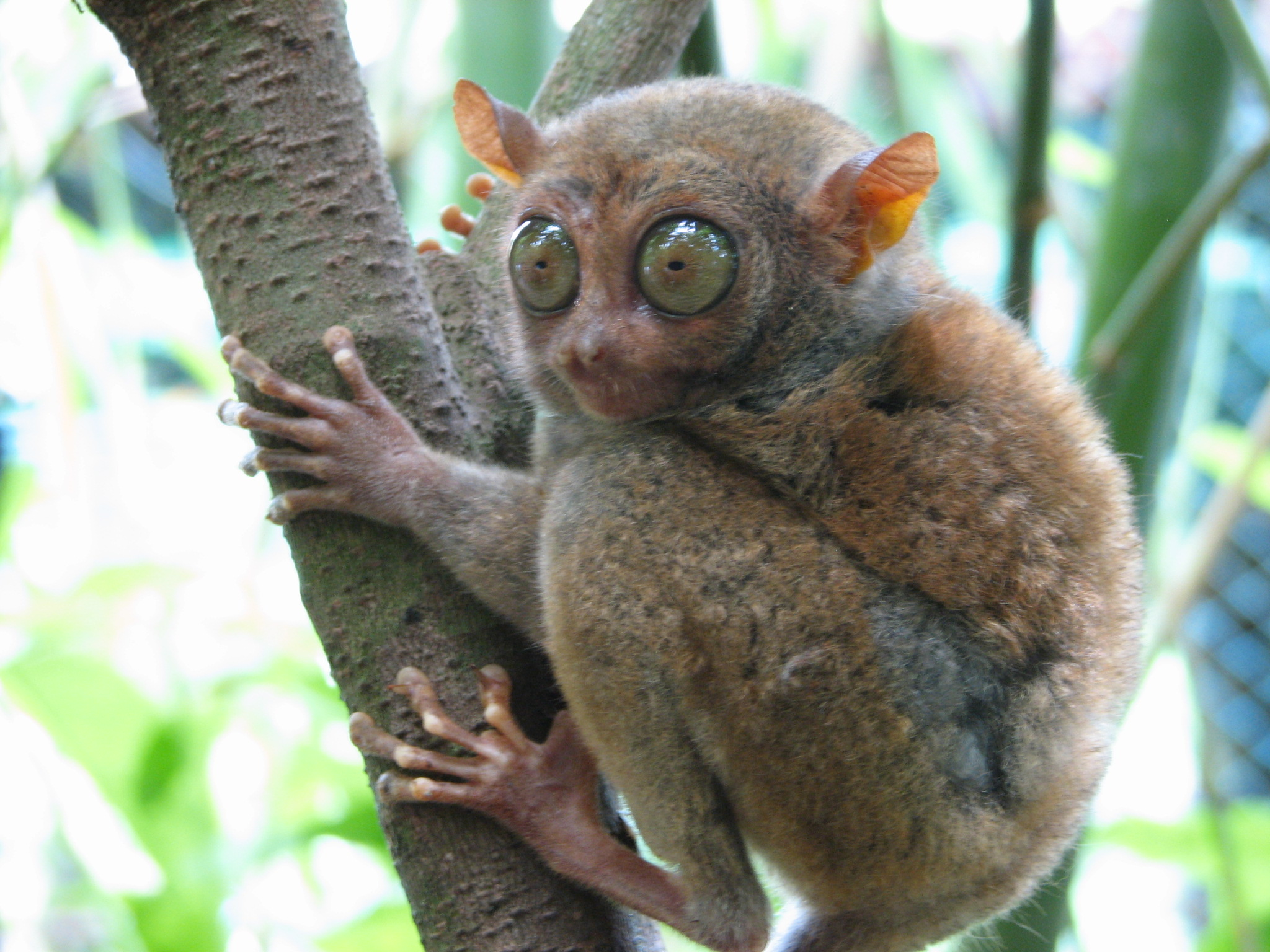
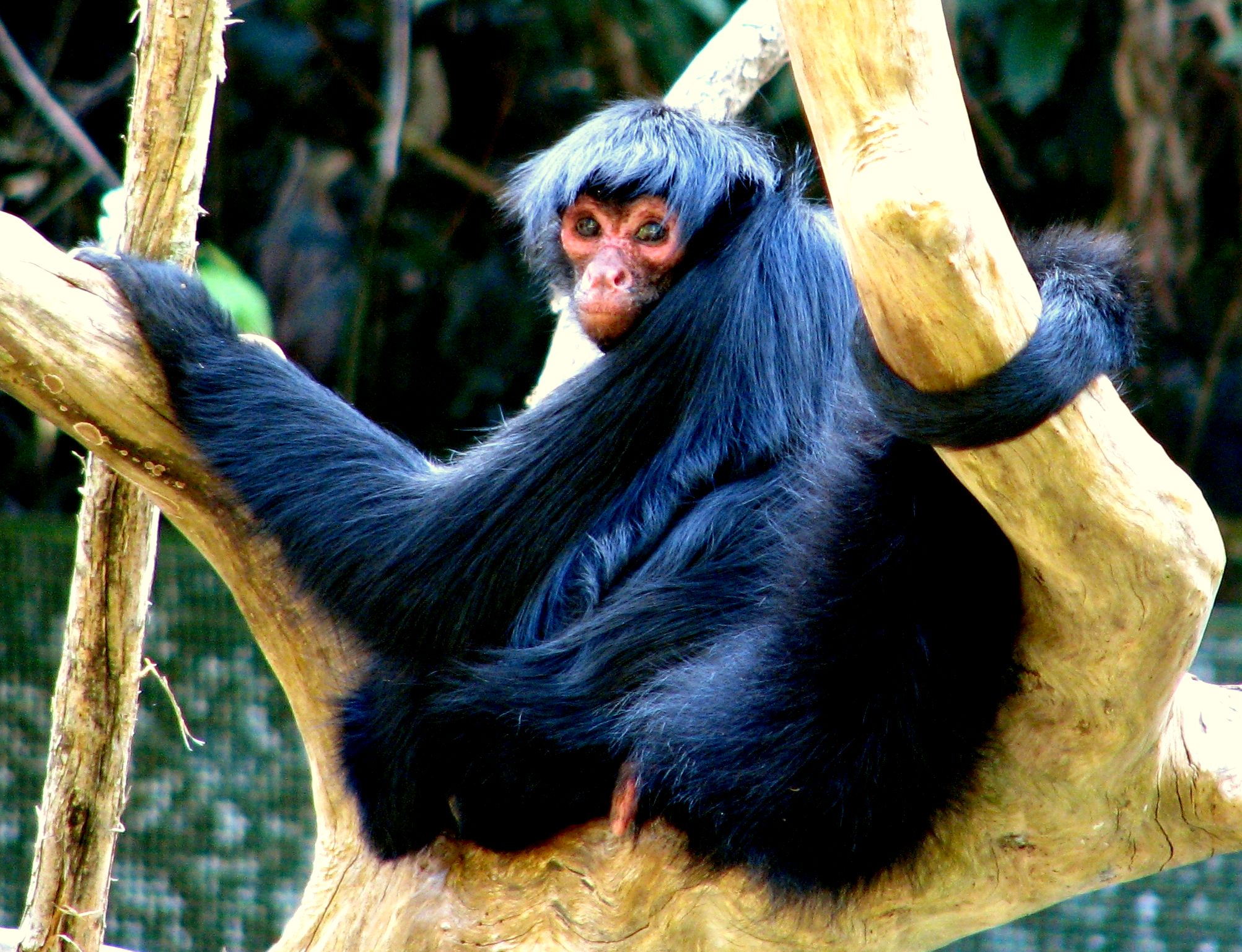
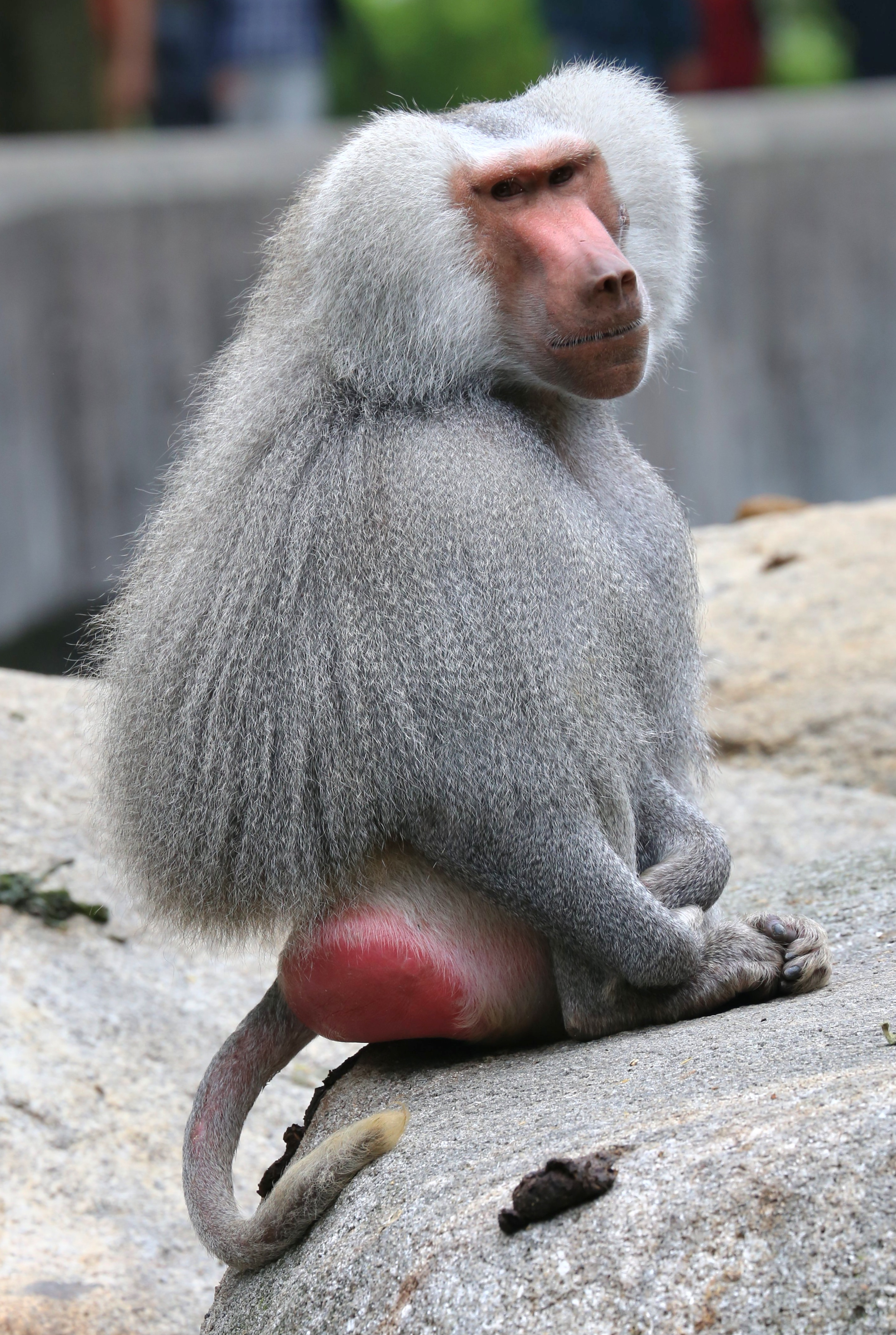
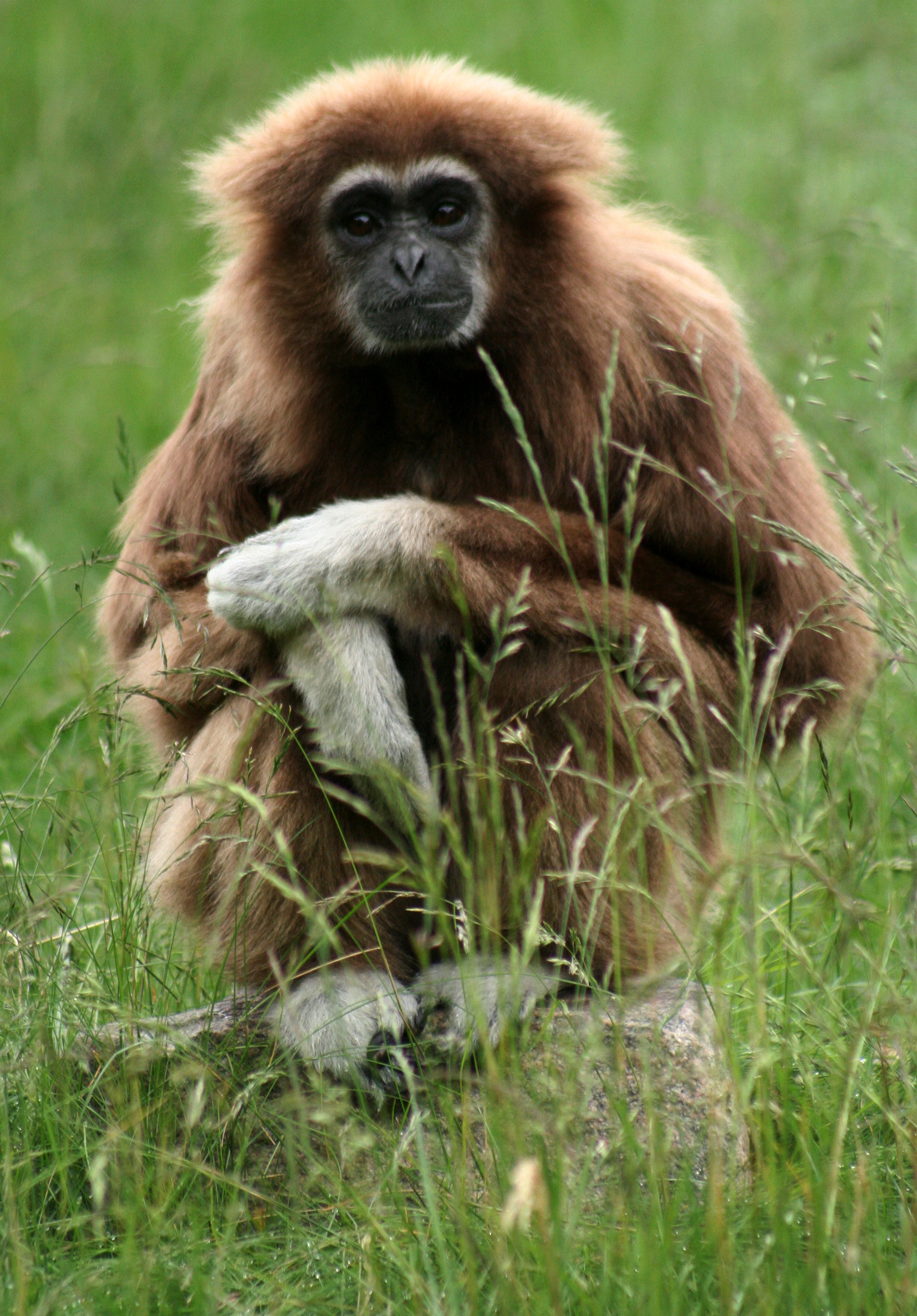
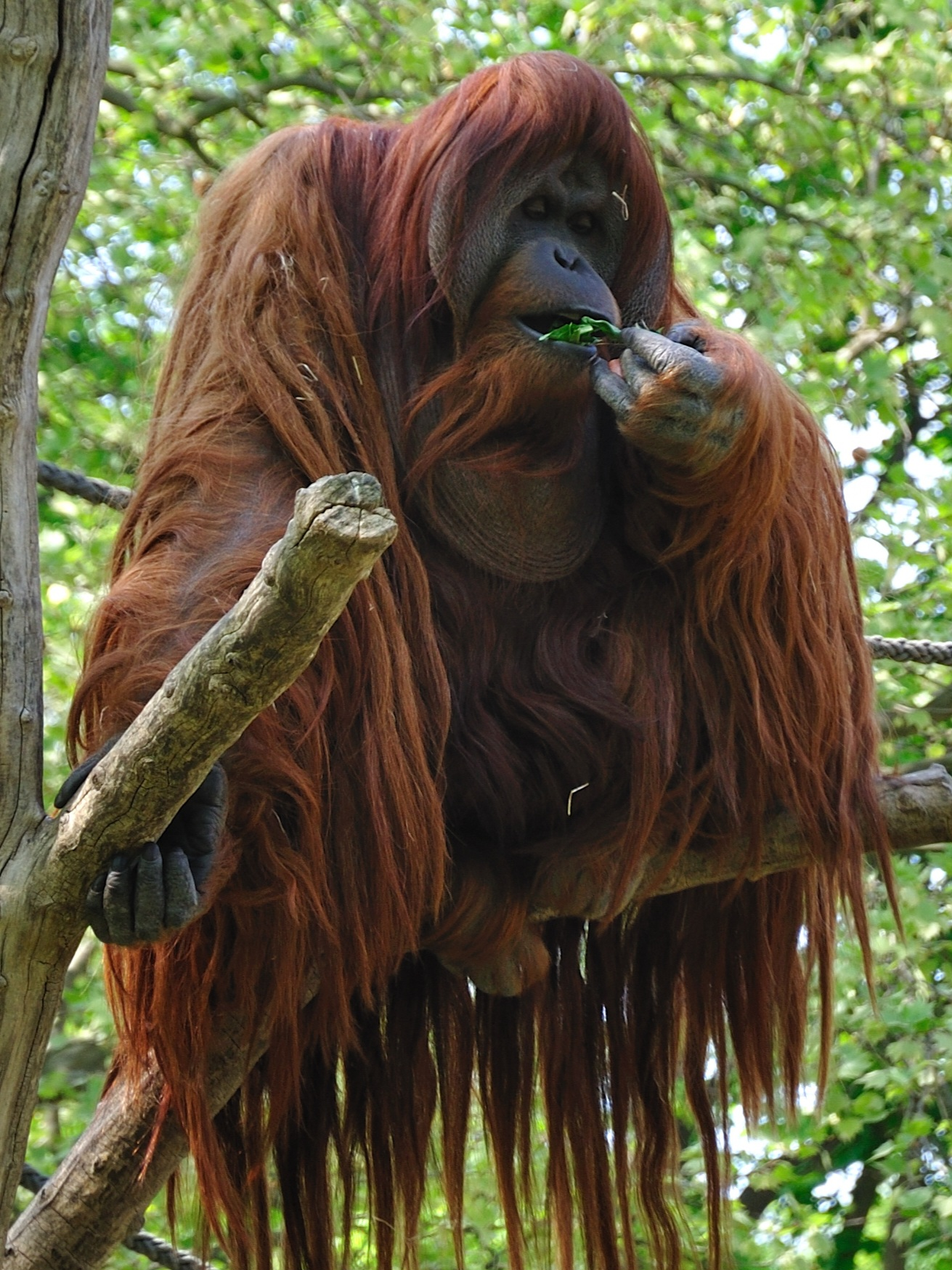
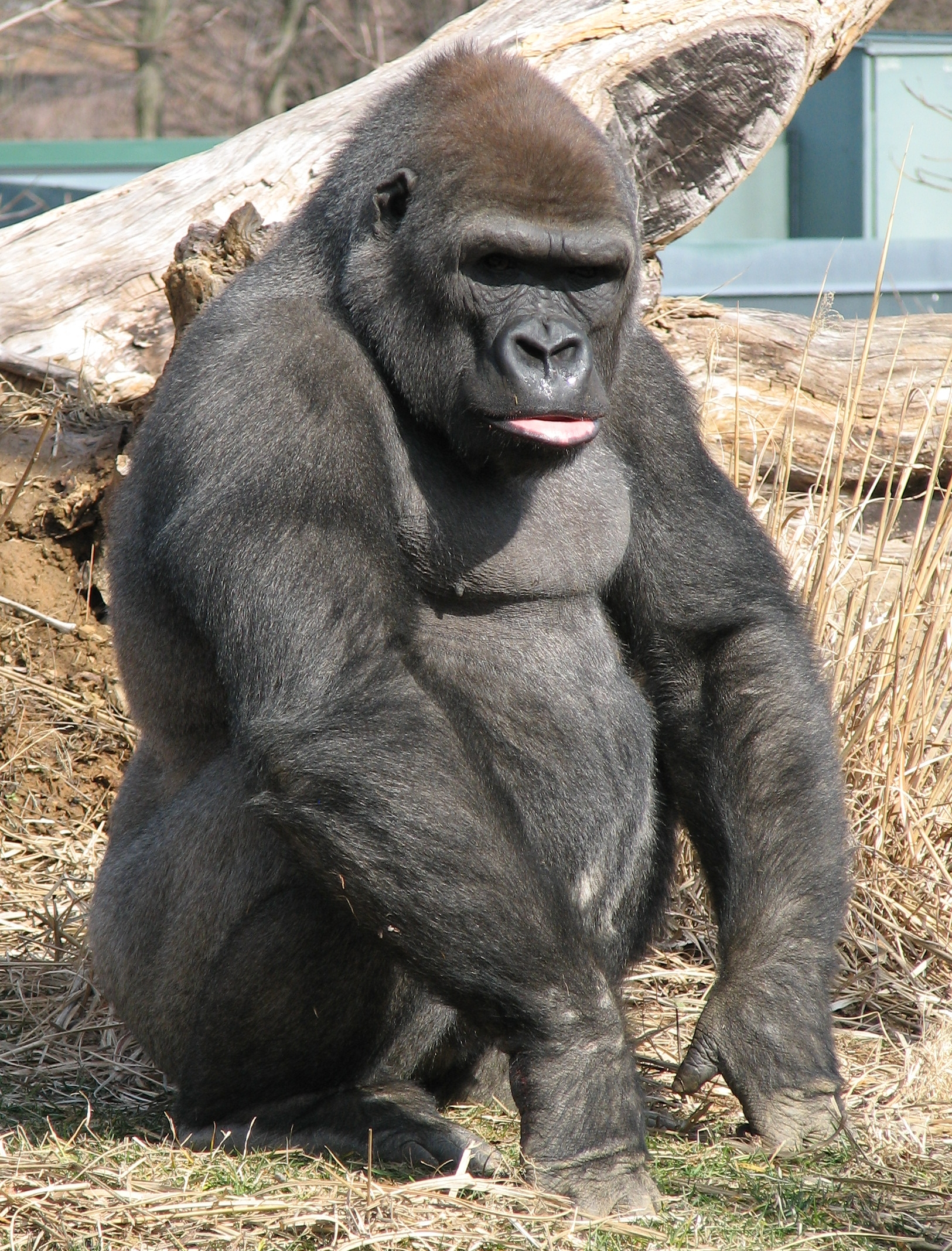
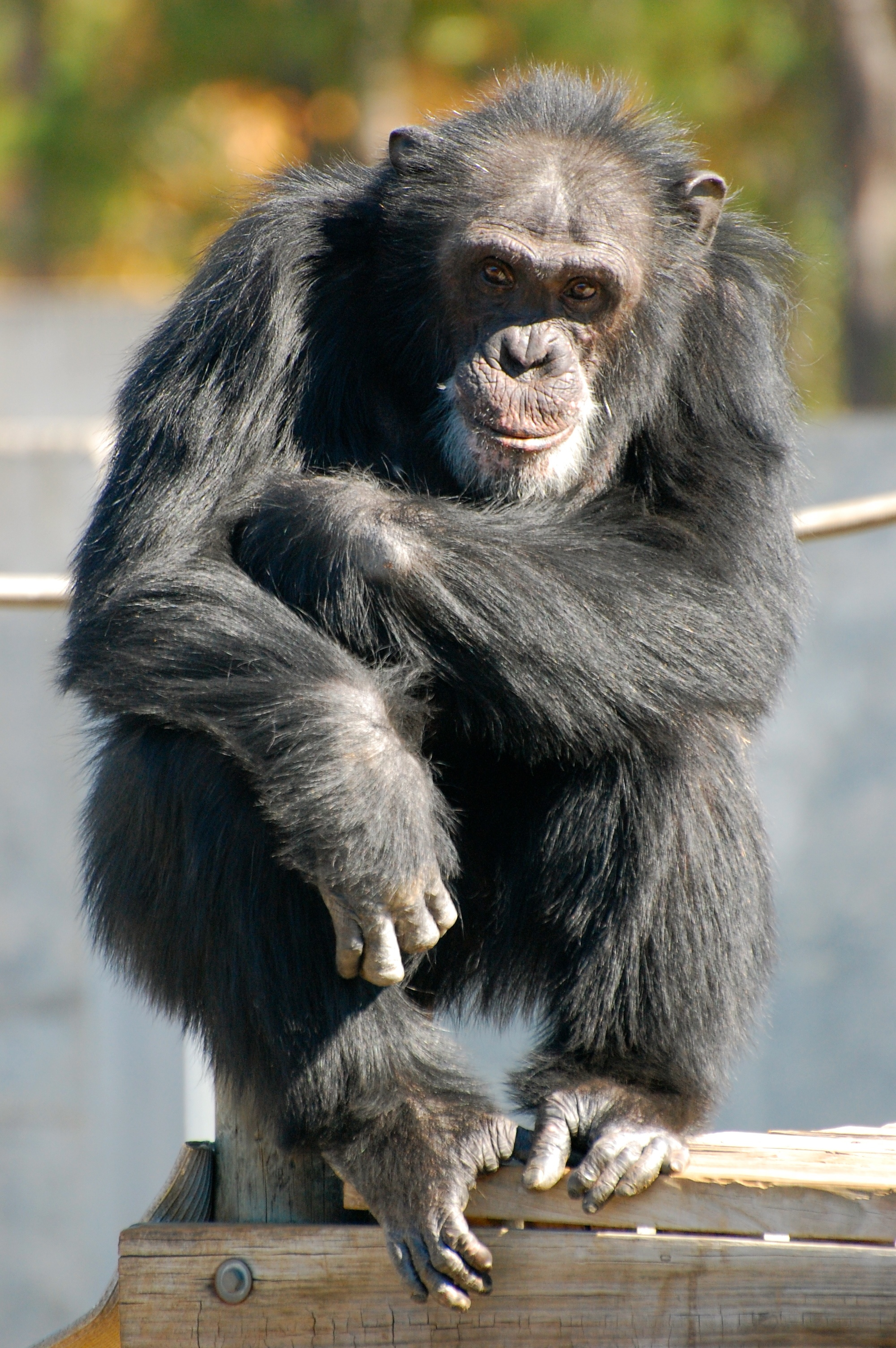
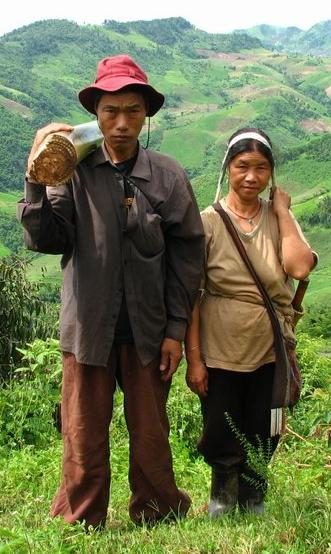
- Philippine tarsier Black spider monkey Hamadryas baboon Lar gibbon Sumatran orangutan Western gorilla Chimpanzee Humans

Scientific classification
- Kingdom: Animalia
- Phylum: Chordata
- Class: Mammalia
- Order: Primates
- Suborder: Haplorhini; Pocock, 1918

Infraorders
- †Eosimiiformes; Simiiformes (monkeys and apes); Tarsiiformes (tarsiers)

Synonyms
- Simia

= Haplorhini =

Haplorhines Temporal range: Paleocene–Holocene

Suborder of primates

Haplorhini (/hæpləˈraɪnaɪ/), the haplorhines (Greek for "simple-nosed") or the "dry-nosed" primates is a suborder of primates containing the tarsiers and the simians (Simiiformes or anthropoids), as sister of the Strepsirrhini ("moist-nosed"). The name is sometimes spelled Haplorrhini. The simians include catarrhines (Old World monkeys and apes, including humans), and the platyrrhines (New World monkeys).

Haplorhini was proposed by Pocock in 1918 when he realized the tarsiers were actually sister to the monkeys rather than the lemurs, also following findings of Hugh Cuming 80 years earlier and Linnaeus 160 years earlier. For Linnaeus, this ensemble of primates constituted a genus "Simia". For religious reasons, Homo constituted its own genus (which has remained).

The extinct omomyids, which are considered to be the most basal haplorhines, are believed to be more closely related to the tarsiers than to other haplorhines. The exact relationship is not yet fully established – Williams, Kay and Kirk (2010) prefer the view that tarsiers and simians share a common ancestor, and that common ancestor shares a common ancestor with the omomyids, citing evidence from analysis by Bajpal et al. in 2008; but they also note two other possibilities – that tarsiers are directly descended from omomyids, with simians being a separate line, or that both simians and tarsiers are descended from omomyids.

Haplorhines share a number of derived features that distinguish them from the strepsirrhine "wet-nosed" primates (whose Greek name means "curved nose"), the other suborder of primates from which they diverged some 63 million years ago. The haplorhines, including tarsiers, have all lost the function of the terminal enzyme that manufactures Vitamin C, while the strepsirrhines, like most other orders of mammals, have retained this enzyme. Genetically, five short interspersed nuclear elements (SINEs) are common to all haplorhines whilst absent in strepsirrhines. The haplorhine upper lip, which has replaced the ancestral rhinarium found in strepsirrhines, is not directly connected to their nose or gum, allowing a large range of facial expressions. Their brain-to-body mass ratio is significantly greater than the strepsirrhines, and their primary sense is vision. Haplorhines have a postorbital plate, unlike the postorbital bar found in strepsirrhines. Most species are diurnal (the exceptions being the tarsiers and the night monkeys).

All anthropoids have a single-chambered uterus; tarsiers have a bicornate uterus like the strepsirrhines. Most species typically have single births, although twins and triplets are common for marmosets and tamarins. Despite similar gestation periods, haplorhine newborns are relatively much larger than strepsirrhine newborns, but have a longer dependence period on their mother. This difference in size and dependence is credited to the increased complexity of their behavior and natural history.

== Etymology ==
The taxonomic name Haplorhini derives from the Ancient Greek haploûs (ἁπλούς, 'onefold', 'single', 'simple') and rhinos (ῥις (genitive ῥινός), 'nose'). It refers to the lack of a rhinarium or "wet nose", which is found in many mammals, including strepsirrhine primates.

== Classification and evolution ==
Molecular estimates based on mitochondrial genomes suggest Haplorhini and its sister clade, Strepsirrhini, diverged 74 million years ago (mya), but no crown primate fossils are known prior to the beginning of the Eocene, 56 mya. The same molecular analysis suggests the infraorder Tarsiiformes, whose only remaining family is that of the tarsier (Tarsiidae), branched off from the other haplorhines 70 mya. The fossil Archicebus may be similar to the most recent common ancestor at this time.

The other major clade within Haplorhini, the simians (or anthropoids), is divided into two parvorders: Platyrrhini (the New World monkeys) and Catarrhini (the Old World monkeys and apes). The New World monkeys split from catarrhines about 35–40 mya and have African origin, while the apes (Hominoidea) diverged from Old World monkeys (Cercopithecoidea) about 25 mya. The available fossil evidence indicates that both the hominoid and cercopithecoid clades originated in Africa.

The following is the listing of the living haplorhine families, and their placement in the Order Primates:

- Order Primates
  - Suborder Strepsirrhini: lemurs, lorises, galagos etc.
  - Suborder Haplorhini: tarsiers + monkeys and apes
    - Infraorder Tarsiiformes
      - Family Tarsiidae: tarsiers
    - Infraorder Simiiformes: monkeys and apes
      - Parvorder Platyrrhini: New World monkeys
        - Family Callitrichidae: marmosets, tamarins
        - Family Cebidae: capuchins, squirrel monkeys
        - Family Aotidae: night or owl monkeys (douroucoulis)
        - Family Pitheciidae: titis, sakis, uakaris
        - Family Atelidae: howler, spider, and woolly monkeys
      - Parvorder Catarrhini Old World anthropoids
        - Superfamily Cercopithecoidea
          - Family Cercopithecidae: Old World monkeys
        - Superfamily Hominoidea: apes
          - Family Hylobatidae: lesser apes (gibbons)
          - Family Hominidae: great apes

== Uncertain placement of extinct early haplorhines ==
The exact placement of early haplorhine families is uncertain owing to limited evidence. The following sets out a possible order put together by Williams, Kay and Kirk in 2010, based on cladograms put together by Seiffert et al. (2005), Marivaux (2006) and Bajpai et al. (2008), and should not be seen as definitive. They do not include Propliopithecoidea as they classify them as early catarrhines. Also included are Archicebidae, the discovery of which was announced by Ni et al. in 2013. (but see notes below regarding placement).

- Order Primates
  - †Plesiadapiformes
  - Strepsirrhini: lemurs, lorises, galagos and their ancestors
  - Haplorhini
    - possible stem Haplorrhini – see explanation below
    - Tarsiiformes /Omomyiformes Tarsiers and their ancestors
      - †Archicebidae
      - Tarsiidae
    - Anthropoidea/Simiiformes
      - †Eosimiidae early anthropoids (or simians)
      - †Amphipithecidae
      - †Parapithecoidea
      - †Proteopithecoidea
      - †Oligopithecidae
      - Catarrhini Old World anthropoids
      - Platyrrhini New World monkeys

Sigé et al. (1990) describe Altiatlasius as an Omomyiform, but also state that it could be an early anthropoid, with the latter view being supported by Godinot (1994) and Bajpai et al. (2008).

Kay et al. (2004) point out that a case can be made for Amphipithecidae being placed either as adapiformes (i.e. early strepsirrhines) or as early anthropoids, noting in particular that they had a long evolution separate from other groups, and that key parts of their anatomy are missing from the fossil record. They conclude that either possibility is equally plausible.

Kay and Williams (2013, edited by Feagle and Kay), look at possible hypotheses about how oligopiths, parapiths and propliopiths relate to each other and catarrhines and platyrrhines:

- that parapiths and propliopiths are closely related, with their common ancestor being related to oligopiths, and the common ancestor of all three being related to the platyrrhines with extant catarrhines (i.e. cercopithecoidea and hominoidea) being descended from the propliopiths;
- or that parapiths and propliopiths are closely related but their common ancestor is closely related to the platyrrhines and the common ancestor of all three is related to the oligopiths, with extant catarrhines again being descended from the propliopiths;
- or that propliopiths and oligopiths are closely related, and parapiths are related to the common ancestor of both and the common ancestor of all three is related to the platyrrhines, with cercopithecoidea being descended from the parapiths and hominoidea being descended from propliopiths.
- finally, they also consider the hypothesis that oligopiths are adapiformes (i.e. early strepsirrhines rather than early haplorhines)

Ni et al., in announcing Archicebus achilles in 2013 as what they describe as the earliest known primate with such detailed remains, place it somewhat differently to the above as they place Omomyids within Tarsiiformes, with Omomyids and Tarsiidae sharing a common ancestor, and that common ancestor sharing a common Tarsiiform ancestor with the Archicebidae.

Possible stem Haplorhini are some species which are usually considered to be Strepsirrhini, such as the Notharctidae, and Darwinius.
