= Biretia =

Biretia Temporal range: Late Eocene, 37 Ma

Scientific classification
- Kingdom: Animalia
- Phylum: Chordata
- Class: Mammalia
- Infraclass: Placentalia
- Order: Primates
- Family: †Parapithecidae
- Genus: †Biretia

Species
- †Biretia piveteaui; †Biretia fayumensis; †Biretia megalopsis

Extinct genus of monkeys

Biretia is an extinct genus of anthropoid primate belonging to the extinct family Parapithecidae. Fossils are found from Late Eocene strata in Egypt.

The first discovery of Biretia was a single tooth dated to approximately 37 mya, which was found in 1988 at the Bir el Ater site in Algeria. This species was named Biretia piveteaui. In 2005, two new species were classified, B. fayumensis and B. megalopsis. Both were discovered at Birket Qarun Locality 2 (BQ-2), which is located about 60 mi south of Cairo in Egypt's Fayum depression.

== Appearance ==
A very small anthropoid, it only weighed around 280 to about 380 g (9.9 to about 13.4 oz). Fragments from the jaw suggest that it had had very large eyes in proportion to its body size, which would suggest that it was nocturnal. Biretia is unique among early anthropoids in exhibiting evidence for nocturnality, but derived dental features shared with younger parapithecids draw this genus, and possibly 45-million-year-old Algeripithecus (Strepsirrhini), into a morphologically and behaviorally diverse parapithecoid clade of great antiquity."

== Species ==
The smallest of the species, B. fayumensis, had an estimated weight of 273 g, while the largest, B. megalopsis, had a weight of about 376g. Adaptations of the skull of B. megalopsis are easily comparable to the modern tarsiers, a small, modern Asian primate with a nocturnal insectivorous lifestyle. We can infer the possibility of a nocturnal lifestyle for B. megalopsis from the animal's molar roots, which are truncated to accommodate for large eye sockets typical of a nocturnal primate. The large eye structure and similarity to the modern tarsiers also suggests that it has lost its tapetum lucidum. Thus, B. megalopsis demonstrates itself as being the oldest known nocturnal primate.

=== Fossil fragments ===
The genus is otherwise known only from a handful of fossil fragments, including a few maxilla fragments and some teeth and teeth fragments from the different species.

The fossil fragments found for B. fayumensis, new species, include a composite of isolated P2 (DPC 21759C), P3 (DPC 21249E), P4 (DPC 21371A), M1 (DPC 21250D), and M2 (DPC 21539E). For B. megalopsis, new species, maxilla with M1 through M3 (DPC 21358F).
