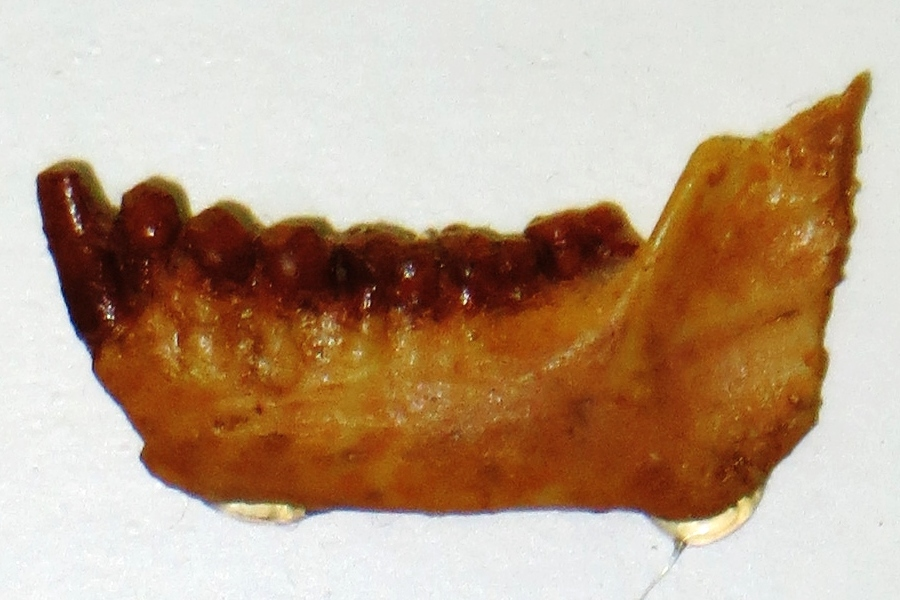
- Mandible of P. grangeri

Scientific classification
- Kingdom: Animalia
- Phylum: Chordata
- Class: Mammalia
- Order: Primates
- Family: †Parapithecidae
- Genus: †Parapithecus; Schlosser, 1910

Species
- P. fraasi Schlosser, 1910

= Parapithecus =

Parapithecus Temporal range: Eocene-Oligocene, 40–33 Ma

Extinct genus of primates

Parapithecus is an extinct genus of primate that lived during the Late Eocene-Earliest Oligocene in what is now Egypt. Its members are considered to be basal anthropoids and the genus is closely related to Apidium. There are two known species. They lived about 40 to 33 million years ago.

== Description ==
Parapithecus had an unusual dentition, which contained no adult lower incisors. The upper dentition likely had four incisors. This means the adult dental formula can be expressed as: Incisors: 2/0; Canines: 1/1; Premolars: 3/3; Molars: 3/3.

== Palaeobiology ==
=== Palaeoecology ===
The dental microwear of Parapithecus was most similar to that of modern frugivorous primates, suggesting that Parapithecus fed mainly on fruits. The shearing quotient of Parapithecus suggests it was somewhat more folivorous than other anthropoids of the Fayum biota, though their molars still did not have the degree of shearing adaptation that extant folivorous hominoids do and it was still mostly frugivorous. Its high crowns suggest it was more terrestrially adapted than other Fayum anthropoids.
