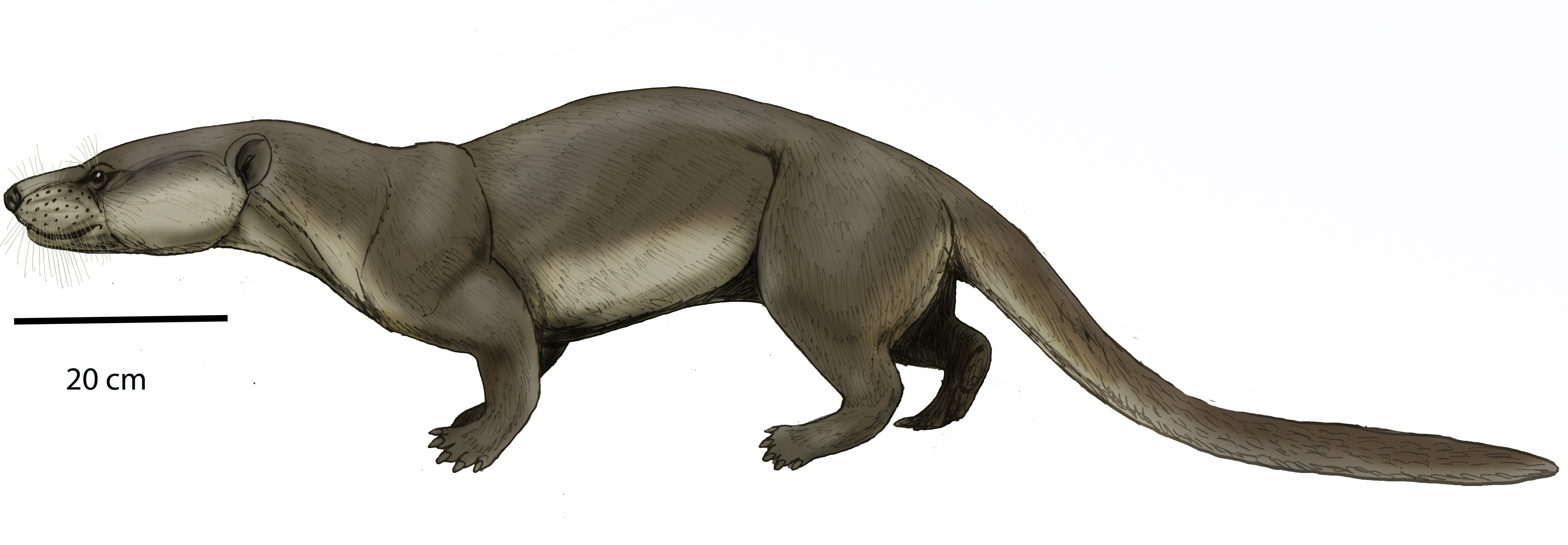
- Apterodon macrognathus life restoration

Scientific classification
- Kingdom: Animalia
- Phylum: Chordata
- Class: Mammalia
- Order: †Hyaenodonta
- Superfamily: †Hyainailouroidea
- Family: †Hyainailouridae
- Subfamily: †Apterodontinae
- Genus: †Apterodon; Fischer, 1880

Type species
- †Apterodon gaudryi Fischer, 1880

Species
- †A. altidens (Schlosser, 1910); †A. gaudryi (Fischer, 1880); †A. langebadreae (Grohé, 2012); †A. macrognathus (Andrews, 1904); †A. rauenbergensis (Frey, 2010); †A. saghensis (Simons & Gingerich, 1976); †A. sp. [Dur At-Talah escarpment, Libya] (Grohé, 2012)

Synonyms
- synonyms of genus: Dasyurodon (Andreae, 1887); synonyms of species: A. gaudryi: Apterodon flonheimensis (Andreae, 1887); Apterodon intermedius (Lange-Badré & Böhme, 2005); Dasyurodon flonheimensis (Andreae, 1887); A. macrognathus: Pterodon macrognathus (Andrews, 1904)

= Apterodon =

Apterodon Temporal range: Late Eocene to Early Oligocene (Priabonian to Rupelian), 37–30.9 Ma
- Two views of the skull of Apterodon macrognathus

Extinct genus of mammals

Apterodon ("without winged tooth") is an extinct genus of hyaenodonts from extinct subfamily Apterodontinae within paraphyletic family Hyainailouridae, that lived from the late Eocene to the early Oligocene epoch in Africa and Europe. ^{Including supplementary materials} It is closely related to the African Quasiapterodon.

Uniquely among hyaenodonts, species of Apterodon were semiaquatic, fossorial mammals. They possessed strong forelimbs that were well equipped for digging, compared to those of modern badgers, while the tail, torso and hindlimbs show adaptations similar to those of other aquatic mammals like otters and pinnipeds. The dentition was suited to feed on hard-shelled invertebrate prey, such as crustaceans and shellfish. They probably lived along African coastlines.

Dental analysis found that within Apterodon macrognathus, the dental eruption of secondary dentition occurred much more slowly than in carnivorans.

== Taxonomy ==
* Subfamily: †Apterodontinae(Szalay, 1967)
  - Genus: †Apterodon (Fischer, 1880)
    - †Apterodon altidens (Schlosser, 1910)
    - †Apterodon gaudryi (Fischer, 1880)
    - †Apterodon langebadreae (Grohé, 2012)
    - †Apterodon macrognathus (Andrews, 1904)
    - †Apterodon rauenbergensis (Frey, 2010)
    - †Apterodon saghensis (Simons & Gingerich, 1976)
    - †Apterodon sp. [Dur At-Talah escarpment, Libya] (Grohé, 2012)
  - Genus: †Quasiapterodon (Lavrov, 1999)
    - †Quasiapterodon minutus (Schlosser, 1910)

== Description ==
Apterodon macroganthis was a large hyaenodont, weighing between 25.6–35.4 kg (56–78 lb).

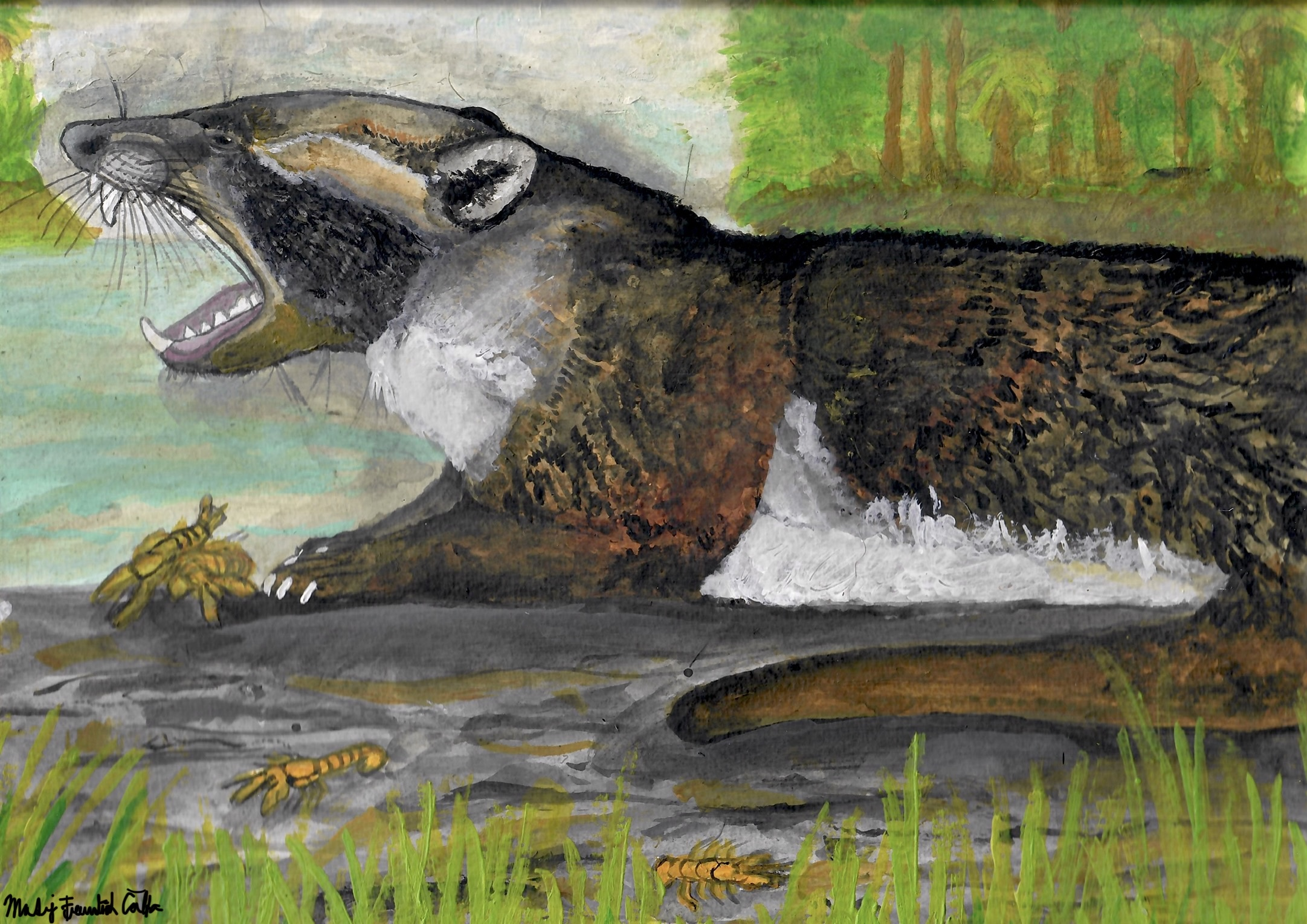
A. langebadreae reconstruction.
