= Oligopithecus =

Oligopithecus Temporal range: Early Oligocene

Scientific classification
- Domain: Eukaryota
- Kingdom: Animalia
- Phylum: Chordata
- Class: Mammalia
- Order: Primates
- Suborder: Haplorhini
- Infraorder: Simiiformes
- Parvorder: Catarrhini
- Family: †Oligopithecidae
- Genus: †Oligopithecus; Simons, 1962

Type species
- †Oligopithecus savagei Simons, 1962

Species
- †Oligopithecus rogeri Gheerbrant et al. 1995; †Oligopithecus savagei Simons, 1962

Extinct genus of primates

Oligopithecus is a fossil primate that lived in Africa during the Early Oligocene. It is represented by one species, Oligopithecus savagei, known from one jaw bone found in Egypt.

== Morphology ==
Oligopithecus savagei has a dental formula of 2.1.2.3 on the lower jaw. The canine is relatively small and the front premolar is narrow. It also resembles the callitrichines more than the catarrhines. The lower third premolar is sectorial. Oligopithecus savagei has primitive molars as compared to other haplorrhines. The lower molars have a trigonid which is higher than the talonid. The lower molars also have a long and obliquely directed cristid obliqua and a small paraconid on the first molar. The lower molars of this species had sharply defined and high occlusal crests and cusps. Based upon the jaw bone, Oligopithecus savagei had a body mass of 1.5 kg (3.3 lb).

Oligopithecus savagei was discovered in Egypt.
