= Qatrania =

Qatrania Temporal range: Early Oligocene, 33 Ma

Scientific classification
- Kingdom: Animalia
- Phylum: Chordata
- Class: Mammalia
- Order: Primates
- Family: †Parapithecidae
- Genus: †Qatrania; Simons & Kay, 1983

Species
- †Q. wingi Simons & Kay, 1983; †Q. fleaglei Simons & Kay, 1988

Extinct genus of primates

Qatrania is an extinct genus of primates in the family Parapithecidae. It was described by Elwyn Simons and Richard Kay in 1983 from fossil material found in the Jebel Qatrani Formation in Egypt. Two species are known: Q. wingi, described in 1983, and Q. fleaglei, described in 1988.

When it was described, Q. wingi was considered the earliest known African simian. The first fossil of the genus was discovered by Scott L. Wing, which is where its epithet comes from. While 'Qatrania' comes from the formation it was found in.

== Description ==
Qatrania was a small primate with a shallow lower jaw and three lower premolars, the teeth located between the canines and molars. Its lower molars had reduced crests, enlarged isolated paraconules on the upper molars and a groove separating the protoconid from the metaconid.

== Classification ==
Simons and Kay identified Qatrania as a member of Parapithecidae based on features of its teeth. The authors considered Qatrania relatively primitive compared with other parapithecids and suggested that it could represent an early branch of the family.

Simons and Kay also argued that some dental similarities previously used to associate parapithecids with catarrhines had evolved independently in the two groups. They noted that anthropoids outside Parapithecidae, including catarrhines and platyrrhines, share derived dental and postcranial features that are absent in parapithecids.

A later study by Beard and Coster (2016) examined an upper molar fragment, specimen YPM 18008, assigned to Q. wingi. Its morphology supported a proposed clade, a group consisting of a common ancestor and all its descendants, containing Qatrania and Apidium within Parapithecidae. The upper molars of both genera have multiple additional cusps and cuspules, which the authors interpreted as possible shared derived characteristics.

== Paleobiology ==
The dental morphology of Qatrania suggests that it had a predominantly frugivorous diet. Fleagle and Kay (1987) noted that its cheek teeth had low cusps and weakly developed crests, features consistent with feeding on relatively soft foods such as fruit or gum. Their interpretation also suggested that insects formed only a minor part of its diet.

The estimated body mass differed between the two species. Qatrania wingi weighed approximately 289 g, while Q. fleaglei was estimated at around 500 g. Indicating that both species were small-bodied, although Q. fleaglei was considerably larger than its congener.

== Species ==
=== Qatrania wingi ===
As the type species of the genus, Qatrania wingi is primarily known from dental material, including an upper molar fragment (specimen YPM 18008). This specimen displays several additional cusps and cuspules, a complex morphology also found in Apidium. These features are interpreted as possible shared derived characteristics linking the two genera.

=== Qatrania fleaglei ===
Q. fleaglei was described by Simons and Kay in 1988 based on a fragmented right hemimandible, one of the two halves of the lower jaw (CGM 41850), from Quarry M within the Jebel Qatrani Formation. It was larger than Q. wingi, weighing around 500 grams.

It had a well-developed paraconid, an accessory cusp located near the front of the first lower molar, which helped identify it as part of Qatrania. The name fleaglei honors paleontologist John G. Fleagle, in recognition of his contributions to the study of Fayum primates.
