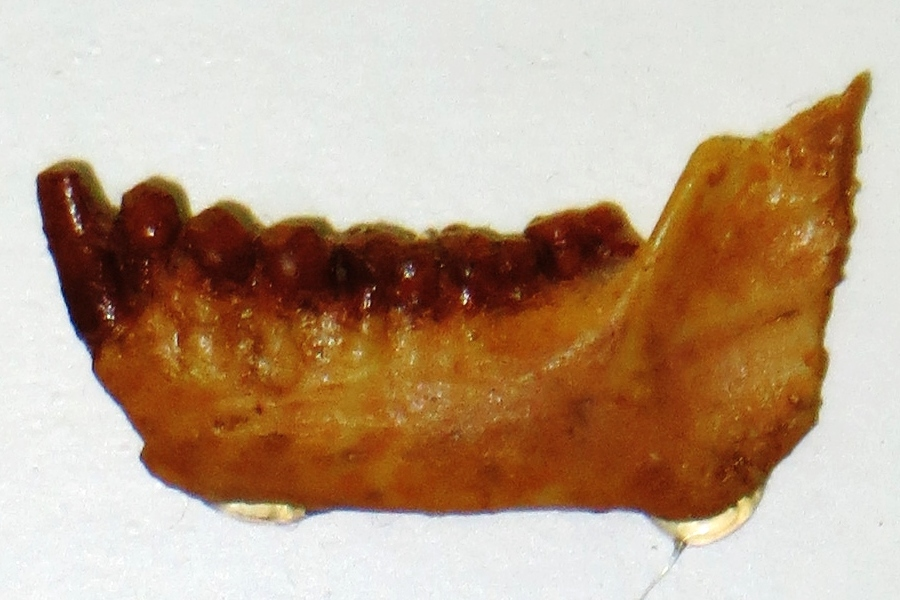
- Mandible of Parapithecus

Scientific classification
- Kingdom: Animalia
- Phylum: Chordata
- Class: Mammalia
- Order: Primates
- Superfamily: †Parapithecoidea
- Family: †Parapithecidae; Schlosser, 1911

Subfamilies and genera
- †Biretia de Bonis et al., 1988; Subfamily †Parapithecinae; †Parapithecus Schlosser, 1910; †Simonsius Gingerich, 1978; Subfamily †Qatraniinae; †Apidium Osborn, 1908; †Qatrania Simons & Kay, 1983; †Ucayalipithecus Seiffert et al., 2020; †Lokonepithecus Ducrocq, Manthi & Lihoreau, 2011; †Abuqatrania Simons et al., 2001

= Parapithecidae =

Parapithecidae Temporal range: Middle Eocene–Late Oligocene

Extinct family of mammals

Parapithecidae is an extinct family of primates which lived in the Eocene and Oligocene periods in Egypt. Eocene fossils from Myanmar are sometimes included in the family in addition. They showed certain similarities in dentition to Condylarthra, but had short faces and jaws shaped like those of tarsiers.

They are part of the superfamily Parapithecoidea, perhaps equally related to Ceboidea and Cercopithecoidea plus Hominoidea - but the placement of Parapithecoidea is substantially uncertain.

== Paleobiology ==
The most commonly found fossil species of parapithecid is Apidium phiomense, found like many of the species in the Jebel Qatrani Formation in Egypt. It appears to have been arboreal, diurnal and frugivorous and lived in social groups, and its postcranial skeleton is similar to that of extant species of pronograde leapers, indicating its likely form of locomotion.

== Paleobiogeography ==
Fossil evidence presented in 2020 suggests a parapithecid rafted across the Atlantic in the Paleogene and at least briefly colonized South America. Ucayalipithecus remains dating from the Early Oligocene of Amazonian Peru are deeply nested within the Parapithecidae, and have dental features markedly different from those of platyrrhines. Qatrania wingi of lower Oligocene Fayum deposits is considered the closest known relative of Ucayalipithecus. The absence of later finds from this group in South America indicates they were outcompeted by platyrrhines, which descend from a parallel anthropoid colonization of South America.

== Classification issues ==
Fleagle and Kay (1987) comment on the difficulty in adequately classifying Parapithecidae - they note various attempts over many years to classify them as a 'sister' taxon of Old World monkeys, all other Old World anthropoids, platyrrhines or all other higher primates. They concluded that, given the number of features they lacked that anthropoids have, they should be considered 'the most primitive higher primates'.

=== Parapithecoidea ===
Parapithecoidea is an extinct superfamily of primates which lived in the Eocene and Oligocene periods in Egypt. However, in some classifications all Parapithecoidea are placed within Parapithecidae. Seiffert et al. (2010) propose that Parapithecoidea arose during the Bartonian (middle Eocene), with a split between Biretia and the Parapithecidae occurring early in the Priabonian (late Eocene). The examination of the dentition of Arsinoea by Seiffert et al. led them to consider that Arsinoea may or may not be a parapithecid, although certainly parapithecoidal, and suggest that Arsinoea kallimos be treated as incertae sedis within Parapithecoidea.

Williams, Kay and Kirk (2010) note previous research by Jaeger et al. that placed Parapithecoidea as stem catarrhines (i.e. simians (aka anthropoids) that are closely related to Old World Monkeys), but consider the evidence from Seiffert et al. (2005) that they are instead stem simians to be stronger.

Seiffert et al. (2010) propose that Parapithecoidea arose during the Bartonian (middle Eocene), with a split between Biretia and the Parapithecidae occurring early in the Priabonian (late Eocene). They note that Simons originally placed Serapia within the Parapithecidae, but in 2001 transferred Serapia to the Proteopithecidae, a view supported by Gunnell and Miller (2001), Beard (2002) and Seiffert et al. (2004 & 2005a). The examination of the dentistry of Arsinoea by Seiffert et al. led them to consider that Arsinoea may or may not be a parapithecid, although certainly parapithecoidal, and suggest that Arsinoea kallimos be treated as 'incertae sedis' within parapithecoidea. They separate the genus Qatrania into two, Abuqatrania for Qatrania basiodontos and Qatrania for the remaining species, and offer some support for Simons 2001 suggestion that Qatrania/Abuqatrania basiodontos may be ancestral to all other Parapithecidae, in particular noting that the fossils are 1 million years older than the next oldest parapithecid, Qatrania wingi.

Morphological analysis of fossil evidence presented in 2020 implies a parapithecid monkey species rafted across the Atlantic in the Paleogene and at least briefly colonized South America. Ucayalipithecus remains dating from the Early Oligocene of Amazonian Peru are deeply nested within the Parapithecidae, and have dental features markedly different from those of platyrrhines. Qatrania wingi of lower Oligocene Fayum deposits is considered the closest known relative of Ucayalipithecus. The absence of later fossil finds from this group in South America indicates they were outcompeted by platyrrhines.

=== Since 2013 ===
Kay and Williams (2013, edited by Feagle and Kay), look at possible hypotheses about Parapithecidae:
- that they and Propliopithecidae are closely related, with their common ancestor being related to Oligopithecus and the common ancestor of all three being related to the platyrrhines, and that more recent catarrhines (i.e. Cercopithecoidea and Hominoidea) are descended from the Propliopithecidae;
- or that Parapithecidae and Propliopithecidae are closely related but their common ancestor is closely related to the platyrrhines and the common ancestor of all three being related to Oligopithecus with more recent catarrhines again being descended from the Propliopithecidae;
- or that Propliopithecidae and Oligopithecus are closely related, and Parapithecicae are related to the common ancestor of both and the common ancestor of all three is related to the platyrrhines, with Cercopithecoidea being descended from the Parapithecidae and Hominoidea being descended from Propliopithecidae.

==== Subfamilies ====
Two subfamilies are sometimes recognized within Parapithecidae:

- Parapithecinae, which have dental features that indicates its members are related.
- Qatraniinae, which also share similar dental features to each other, but they are more primitive and the similarity may be because of shared lineage rather than being closely related.
