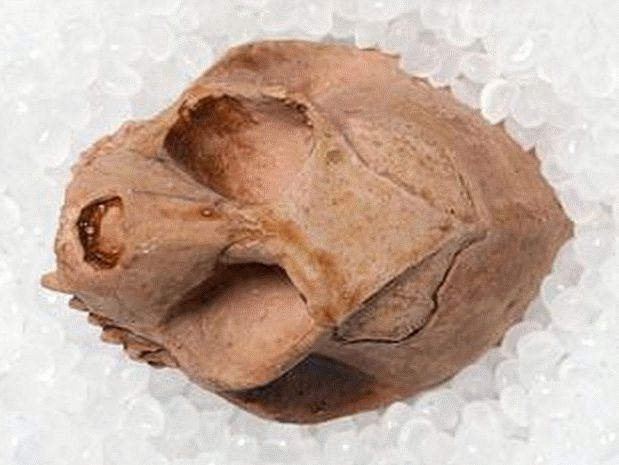

Scientific classification
- Kingdom: Animalia
- Phylum: Chordata
- Class: Mammalia
- Order: Primates
- Suborder: Haplorhini
- Family: †Parapithecidae
- Genus: †Apidium; Osborn, 1908

Species
- †Apidium phiomense †Apidium moustafai †Apidium bowni †Apidium zuetina

= Apidium =

Apidium Temporal range: 30–28 Ma Early Oligocene (Rupelian)

Extinct genus of mammals

The genus Apidium (from Latin, a diminutive of the Egyptian bull god, Apis, as the first fossils were thought to be from a type of a cow) is that of at least three extinct primates living in the early Oligocene, from 30 to 28 million years ago. Apidium fossils are common in the Fayoum deposits of Egypt. Fossils of the earlier species, Apidium moustafai, are rare; fossils of the later species Apidium phiomense are fairly common.

Apidium and its fellow members of the Parapithecidae family are stem anthropoids that possess all the hallmarks of modern Anthropoidea. Their ancestry is closely tied to the Eocene Asian group Eosimiidae.

== Age ==
Apidium fossils were originally thought to be between 35.4 and 33.3 million years old, based on initial analysis of the Jebel Qatrani Formation in which they were found. However, analysis by Erik Seiffert in 2006 concluded that the age of the Jebel Qatrani Formation should be revised. His assessment of more recent evidence indicates an age of between 30.2 and 29.5 million years ago, wholly within the Rupelian (early Oligocene) epoch.

== Behaviour ==
The Apidium species were well adapted to life in what once were the tropical forests of North Africa. They lived in trees and apparently moved on top of tree limbs by a combination of quadrupedalism and leaping, much as do living squirrel monkeys of the genus Saimiri. These primates appear to have been frugivorous and diurnal, with keen eyesight.

Male Apidium were bigger than the females, which, by comparing them with living primates, suggests that they probably lived in groups, where a small number of males would have had control over several females. The males had large canine teeth.

The tooth chipping patterns in Apidium phiomense indicate a predominantly soft fruit diet.
