= Oligopithecidae =

Oligopithecidae Temporal range: Late Eocene–Early Oligocene

Scientific classification
- Kingdom: Animalia
- Phylum: Chordata
- Class: Mammalia
- Order: Primates
- Parvorder: Catarrhini
- Family: †Oligopithecidae; Kay & Williams, 1994

Genera
- †Catopithecus; †Oligopithecus; †Talahpithecus

Extinct family of primates

Oligopithecidae is an extinct basal Catarrhine family from the late Eocene of Egypt (about 37 million years ago) as sister of the rest of the Catarrhines. Its members were probably insectivorous, due to their simple molars and cusp arrangement.
