= Elwyn L. Simons =

American paleontologist

- Born: Elwyn LaVerne Simons; July 14, 1930; Lawrence, Kansas, U.S.
- Died: March 6, 2016 (aged 85)
- Education: Rice University; Princeton University; University College, Oxford
- Spouses: Friderun Ankel-Simons (m. 1972)
- Scientific career
- Fields: Paleontology; Primate conservation
- Workplaces: Princeton University; University of Oxford; University of Pennsylvania; Yale University; Duke University
- Doctoral advisor: Glenn Jepsen
- Notable students: Philip D. Gingerich; D. Tab Rasmussen
- Author abbrev. (zoology): Simons

Elwyn LaVerne Simons (July 14, 1930 – March 6, 2016) was an American paleontologist, paleozoologist, and a wildlife conservationist for primates. He was known as the father of modern primate paleontology for his discovery of some of humankind's earliest antecedents.

His paleontology field work included sites in Egypt, Madagascar, and the U.S. state of Wyoming.

== Works ==
He authored more than 300 scholarly books and research articles, often acting as the sole author or coauthoring with his students and colleagues. He was a member of both the National Academy of Sciences (US) and the American Philosophical Society.

== See also ==
- Paleozoologists
- Prehistoric primates
- Primate conservation
