= Fayum (fossil deposit) =

Fossil deposit in Egypt

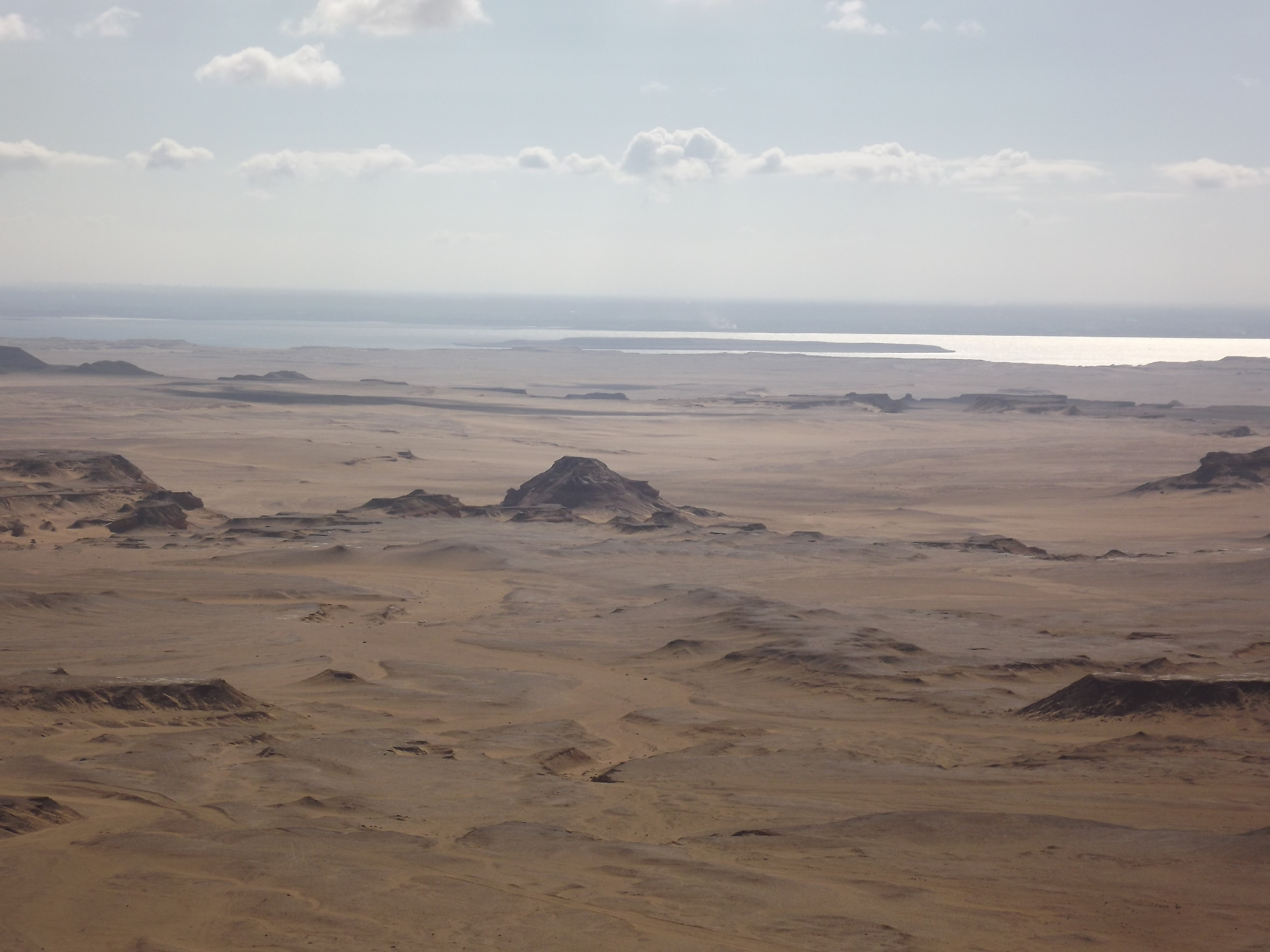
Landscape in the northern Fayum region with a view of Lake Qarun

The Fayum is a region and an important fossil Lagerstätte in northern Egypt. The region comprises the Fayum Basin, which is intensively used for agriculture, and adjoining areas; the important areas of discovery are mostly north and west of Lake Qarun. The Wadi al-Hitan, known for its numerous whale fossils and, since 2005, a UNESCO World Natural Heritage Site, forms the south-western end. The deposits of the Fayum belong to various geological formations. They are mainly composed of limestone, siltstone and sandstone. The lower sections consist of marine sediments, while the upper, continental sediments were formed in a coastal landscape. The formation period ranges from the Middle to the Upper Eocene to the Lower Oligocene, which corresponds to an age of around 41 to 28 million years ago. The entire sedimentary complex is overlain by basalt, which dates back to volcanic activity around 24 million years ago.

The very rich fossil evidence of the Fayum includes plants, invertebrates and vertebrates, and numerous trace fossils have also survived. Vertebrates include fish, reptiles, birds and mammals. Some forms represent important evolutionary links in the development of individual lineages, particularly in the proboscideans, manatees and cetaceans. Among the fossil primates are early forms of Old World monkeys. In addition, marsupials, tenrec-like, even-toed ungulates, bats and rodents also occur. Some groups such as the giant herbivorous Embrithopoda or the predatory Hyaenodonta or the insectivorous Ptolemaiida have no descendants living today. Due to this diversity, the Fayum is the most important fossil site of the African Paleogene. On the basis of the terrestrial vertebrates, a delta-like landscape crisscrossed by watercourses can be distinguished. landscape near the sea coast under tropical climate conditions can be reconstructed.

The first fossil finds in the Fayum date back to the middle of the 19th century. A major phase of investigation took place at the transition from the 19th to the 20th century, when English, American, German and French researchers were active on the site at different times. During this time, numerous fossils were recovered; this led to some important discoveries that contributed to the supra-regional fame of the Fayum region. In addition, the first investigations into geology were also carried out. Modern research began in the 1960s and continues to this day. It is organized internationally. Analyses of the finds lead to the description of new fossil forms from the Fayum almost every year.

== Geographical location ==
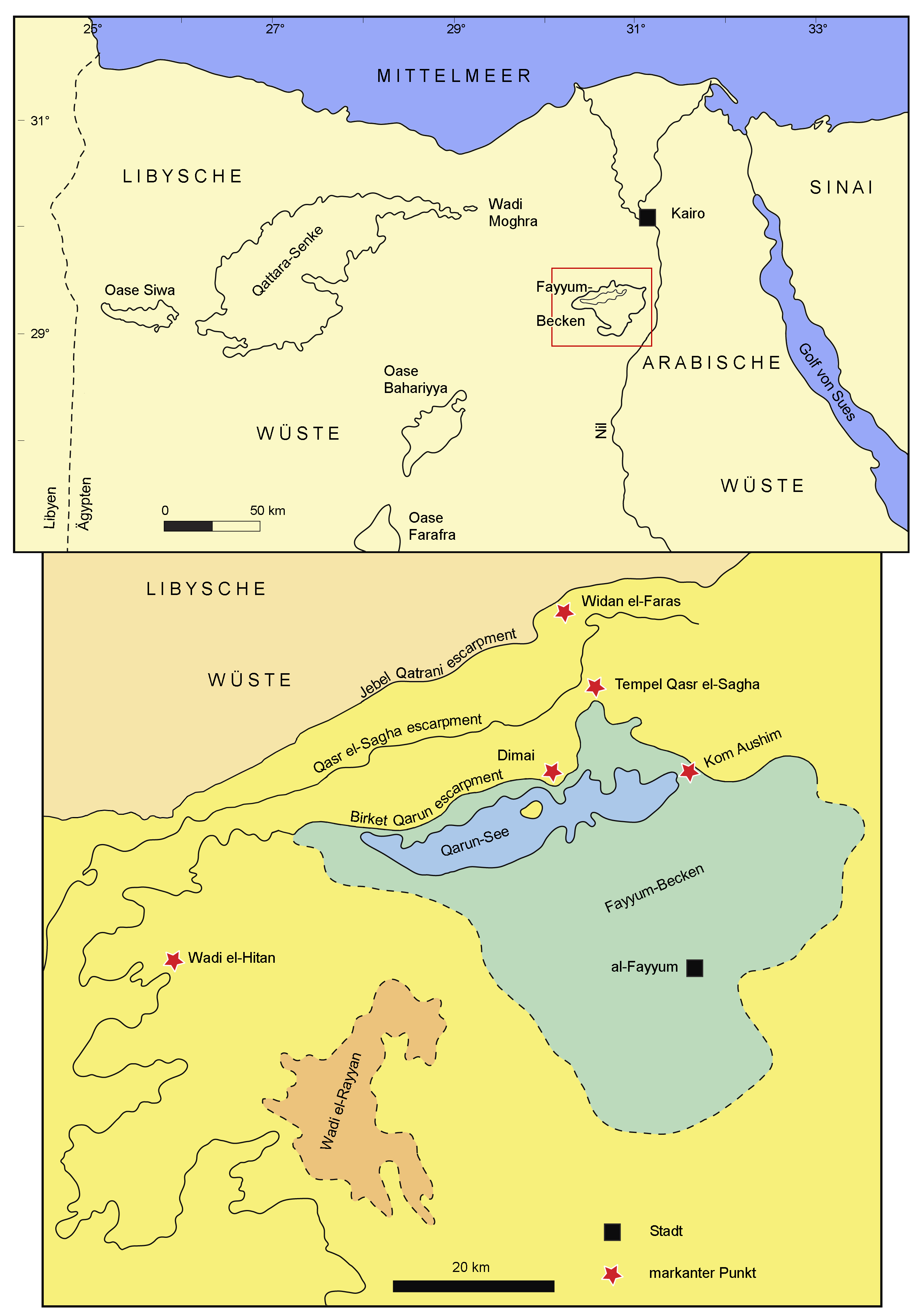
Map of the Fayum area

The Fayum region covers an area of around 12,000 km^{2} (4,600 sq mi) and is located around 70 km (43 mi) southwest of Cairo, situated west of the Nile and in the middle of the Libyan Desert. The center is formed by the Fayum Basin, a depression area of about 1,500 km^{2} (580 sq mi). It has a triangular shape with the tip pointing south. The central town is Faiyum, which is also the capital of the Faiyum Governorate. In the north of the basin lies the approximately 230 km^{2} (89 sq mi) large Lake Qarun, a drainless lake, which has a length of 40 km (25 mi) from northeast to southwest, an average depth of around 5 m (16 ft) and a maximum depth of 7.5 m (25 ft). The island of Geziret el-Qorn rises out of the water as a single land mass. Lake Qarun (German for "Lake of Horns", after the two pointed peninsulas that reach into the lake from the north) is the largest lake in northern Africa, but it is only the remnant of an even larger lake. This existed in the prehistoric and historic past and is known as Lake Moeris. The depression descends from south to north. While the central town of al-Fayyūm is around 24 m (79 ft) above sea level, the water surface of Lake Qarun is around 45 m (148 ft) below sea level. The entire Fayum basin is used for agriculture, with two water collectors (El Bats in the east and El Wadi in the west) draining the excess water into Lake Qarun.

The surroundings of the Fayum Basin consist largely of desert-like terrain. In the east, a 5 to 12 km (3.1 to 7.5 mi) wide ridge separates the depression from the Nile Valley, its upper edge is about 30 to 90 m (98 to 295 ft) above sea level. These marginal mountains show an approximately 1.5 km (0.93 mi) wide breakthrough, through which the Bahr Yussef also runs. The canal connects the Nile with the Fayum depression over a length of 270 km (170 mi). It ends at al-Fayyūm and branches out here into numerous small branches.

To the south is the small basin of el-Gharaq, which has a maximum depth of 4 m (13 ft) below sea level. It is followed by the Wadi el-Rayyan in the southwest and west of the Fayum basin. This is an approximately 700 km^{2} (270 sq mi) large depression, with its deepest point at about 42 m (138 ft) below sea level. The Wadi is fed by its own springs and is today partly filled by lake El Rayan, a two-part artificial lake measuring 51 and 62 km^{2} (20 and 24 sq mi) respectively.

However, the northern border of the Fayum basin is significant, where several escarpments rise. They run from southwest to northeast, over a length of around 70 km (43 mi), and are separated from each other by plateau-like plains. The terrain thus rises from Lake Qarun at its lowest point to an average of 350 m (1,150 ft) above sea level. The most important escarpments from south to north are the Birket Qarun Escarpment, the Qasr el-Sagha Escarpment and the Gebel Qatrani Escarpment. In between, there are smaller steps, such as the el-Ekhwat Escarpment and the Talata Escarpment.

The south-western end of the escarpments marks the Wadi al-Hitan ("Valley of the Whales" or Zeuglodon Valley), around 50 km (31 mi) from Lake Qarun. The area has been a UNESCO World Natural Heritage Site since 2005. It is a broad, flat, approximately 10 km (6.2 mi) long valley that is not an actual wadi in the geomorphologic sense. It is bordered to the northwest by the Birket Qarun Escarpment. In the southwest, on the other hand, a series of flat-topped hills forms the end and are called the "border hills". These two geographical boundaries narrow the valley from about 4 km (2.5 mi) wide in the northeast to about 0.5 km (0.31 mi) in the southwest. About 5 km (3.1 mi) further northeast towards the Fayum basin, another group of hills extends, among them the Garet Gehannam, which rises about 120 m (390 ft) above the surrounding area as an important landmark.

== Geology ==
=== General and underground ===
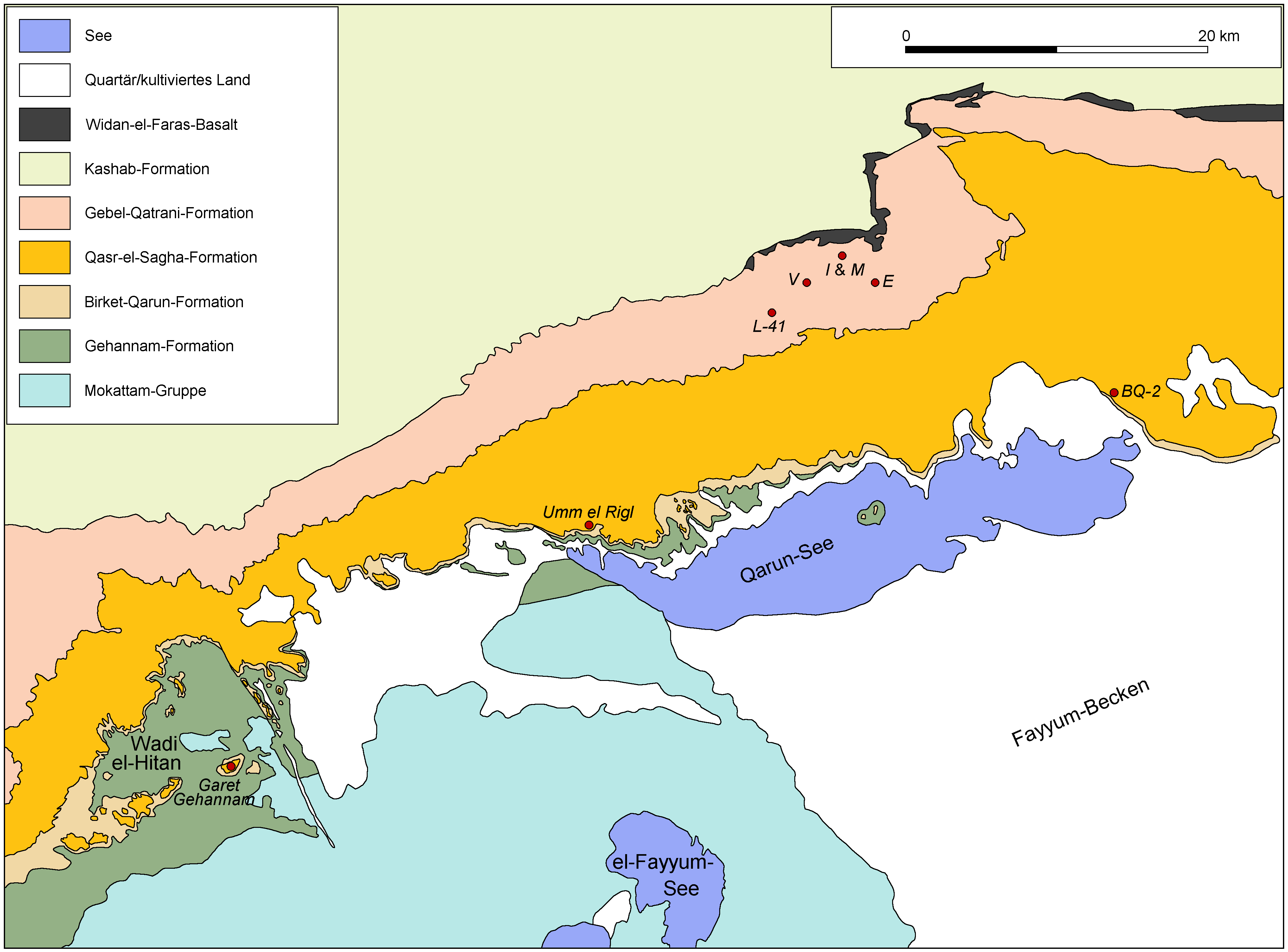
Geology of the northern and northwestern Fayum area with distribution of Eocene and Oligocene sediments

The geological situation of the Fayum region has been the subject of intensive research since the end of the 19th century. Significant work on this was carried out in 1905 by Hugh John Llewellyn Beadnell, published in 1988 by Thomas M. Bown and Mary J. Kraus, and in 1992 by Philip D. Gingerich. The Fayum Basin is a tectonic structure that was formed in the Triassic underground. However, rock layers from this period, such as the Bahariya Formation, only come to the surface in the outermost parts of the region, for example in the north-east. The main faults run from southwest to northeast and belong to the Syrian arc fold belt, which runs in an S-arc from the Levant across the Sinai Peninsula to North Africa. They are also responsible for the formation of the large escarpments north of Lake Qarun. There are also subordinate fault zones running from northwest to southeast and from east to west. They frame the Fayum Basin on all sides. It can, therefore, be assumed that the basin was formed by tectonic tensile forces. These formed the depression in the transition from the Oligocene to the Miocene, possibly in connection with local volcanism. In the region itself, mainly Eocene and Oligocene deposits are formed, with a total thickness of up to 800 m (2,600 ft).

=== Eocene to Oligocene sedimentary sequence ===
==== Mokattam Group ====
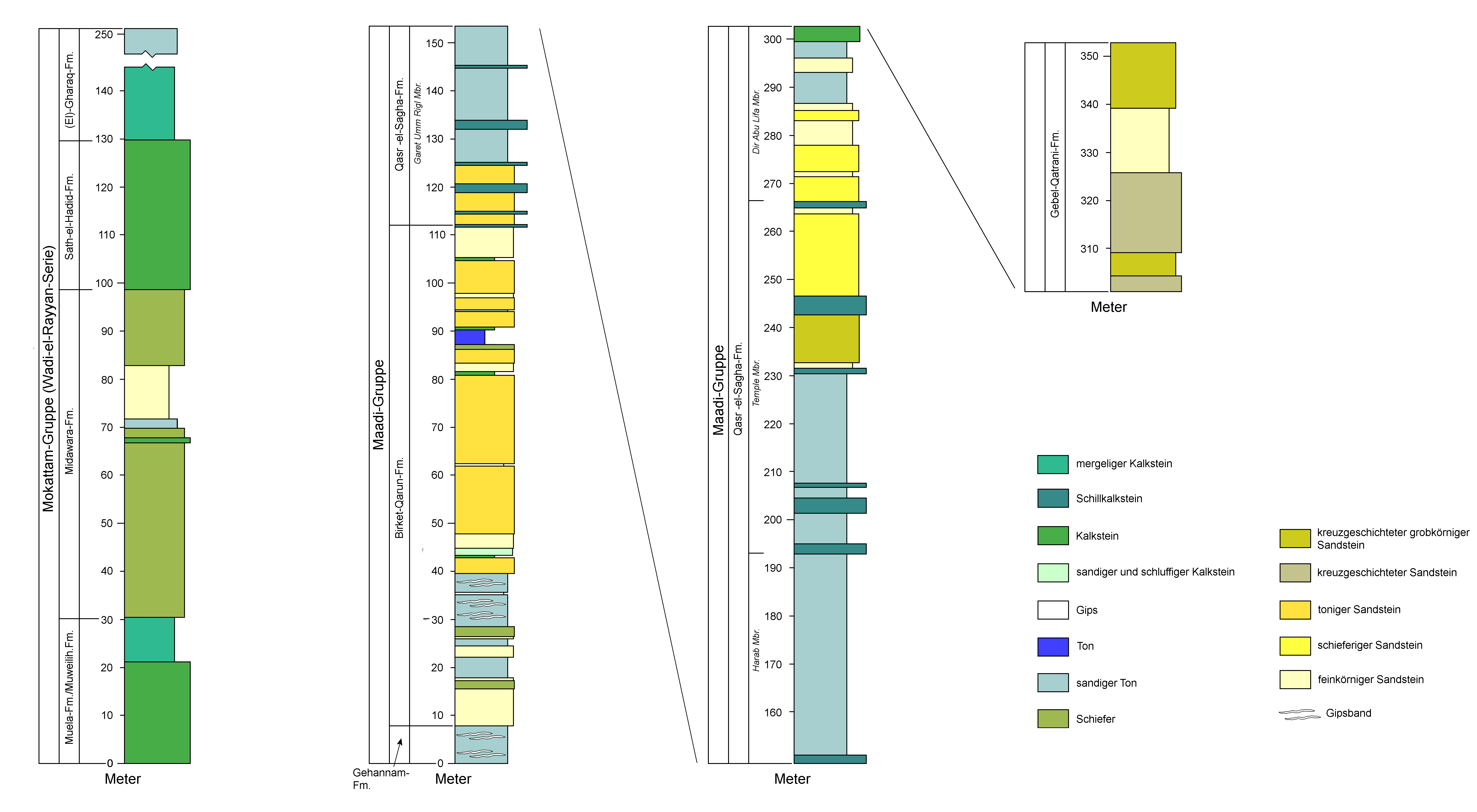
Geological structure of the Eocene and Oligocene sedimentary sequence in the Wadi el-Hitan

The Fayum region's base is generally assigned to the Mokattam group (also called the Wadi el-Rayyan series), named after Gebel Mokattam east of Cairo. It is of marine origin and consists of four rock units: the Muweilih Formation, the Midawara Formation, the Sath El-Hadid Formation and the Gharaq Formation. All four formations are composed of limestones, but they differ in their structure and in the content of nummulites and glauconites. The upper end of the Mokattam Group is defined by a rapid decrease in nummulites and an increase in glauconites. The Gharaq Formation is the most widely outcropped unit of the Mokattam Group in the region and is mostly found in the southwestern Fayum area from Wadi el-Rayyan to the southern part of Wadi el-Hitan and to Garet Gehannam.

==== Maadi Group ====
The Gehannam Formation (also called the ravine beds) is the base member of the Maadi Group. It consists mainly of marine clays, siltstones and sandstones, into which marls and clayey limestones are incorporated. Their total thickness is around 46 m (151 ft). The base consists of glauconitic claystone/siltstones, which are finely laminated and merge upwards into limestone-rich sandstones. This is followed by siltstone, limestone and marls. In some outcrops, limestone again forms the upper end. In some cases, individual gypsum layers are embedded in the upper sections of the Gehannam Formation. The Gehannam Formation is particularly well exposed in the western Fayum area near Wadi el-Hitan and at Garet Gehannam. It also forms the bedrock of most of the cultivated land in the basin.

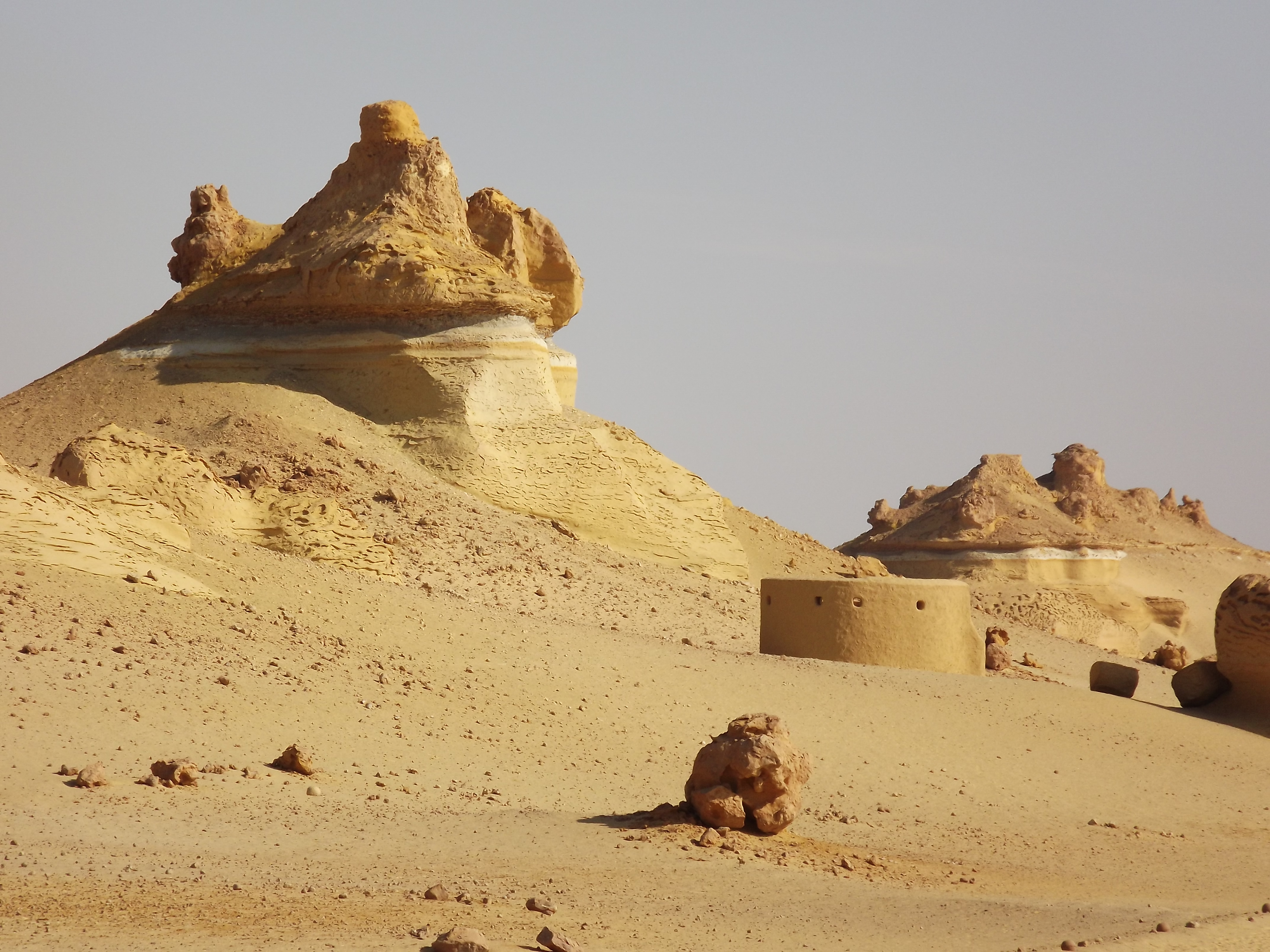
The Birket-Qarun formation in Wadi el-Hitan; the Garet-el-Naqb formation can be seen as a gray stripe about halfway up the rock formations.

All other formations are largely distributed in the escarpments north of Lake Qarun. The Birket Qarun Formation forms the lower escarpment immediately to the north of Lake Qarun, the Birket Qarun Escarpment. It presents itself as a rock unit up to 85 m (279 ft) thick, whose main components are composed of fine to very fine sands and silts, some of which are highly calcareous. Basically, there is a sandstone rich in sea urchins, which is referred to as Schizaster-lybica sandstone. Gypsum precipitates are formed in individual areas. In general, the deposits can be traced back to a coastal sea. In the outcrops to the north of Lake Qarun, they appear as a uniform sedimentary complex, which fans out to the west towards the Wadi el-Hitan and interlocks with the Gehannam Formation in its lower and middle sections. Here, the Birket-Qarun Formation can be subdivided into four individual bodies, which can generally be clearly separated from the Gehannam Formation. A conspicuous feature is a series of narrow, sometimes only 30 cm (12 in) thick, block-like sandstone layers, the uppermost of which is known as the Camp White Layer. The latter is very striking, as it contains numerous whale bones and conspicuous vertical structures, which are interpreted either as roots of mangrove or burial traces of the trace genus Thalassinoides. The Camp White Layer is interpreted in some older works as a boundary layer between the Gehannam and Birket-Qarun formations; however, more recent investigations see it within the upper rock unit.

The Garet-el-Naqb Formation was only defined as a possible rock formation in 2014, but it had already attracted attention as a special formation before then. It is a dark gray clay whose thickness increases from south to north. It reaches its greatest thickness north of the Wadi el-Hitan at around 25 m (82 ft). The rock unit occurs largely only in the western Fayum region; it is not documented north of Lake Qarun. In the outcrops of the western Fayum, the Garet-el-Naqb Formation divides the Birket-Qarun Formation as a strikingly dark horizon or directly overlies the Gehannam Formation.

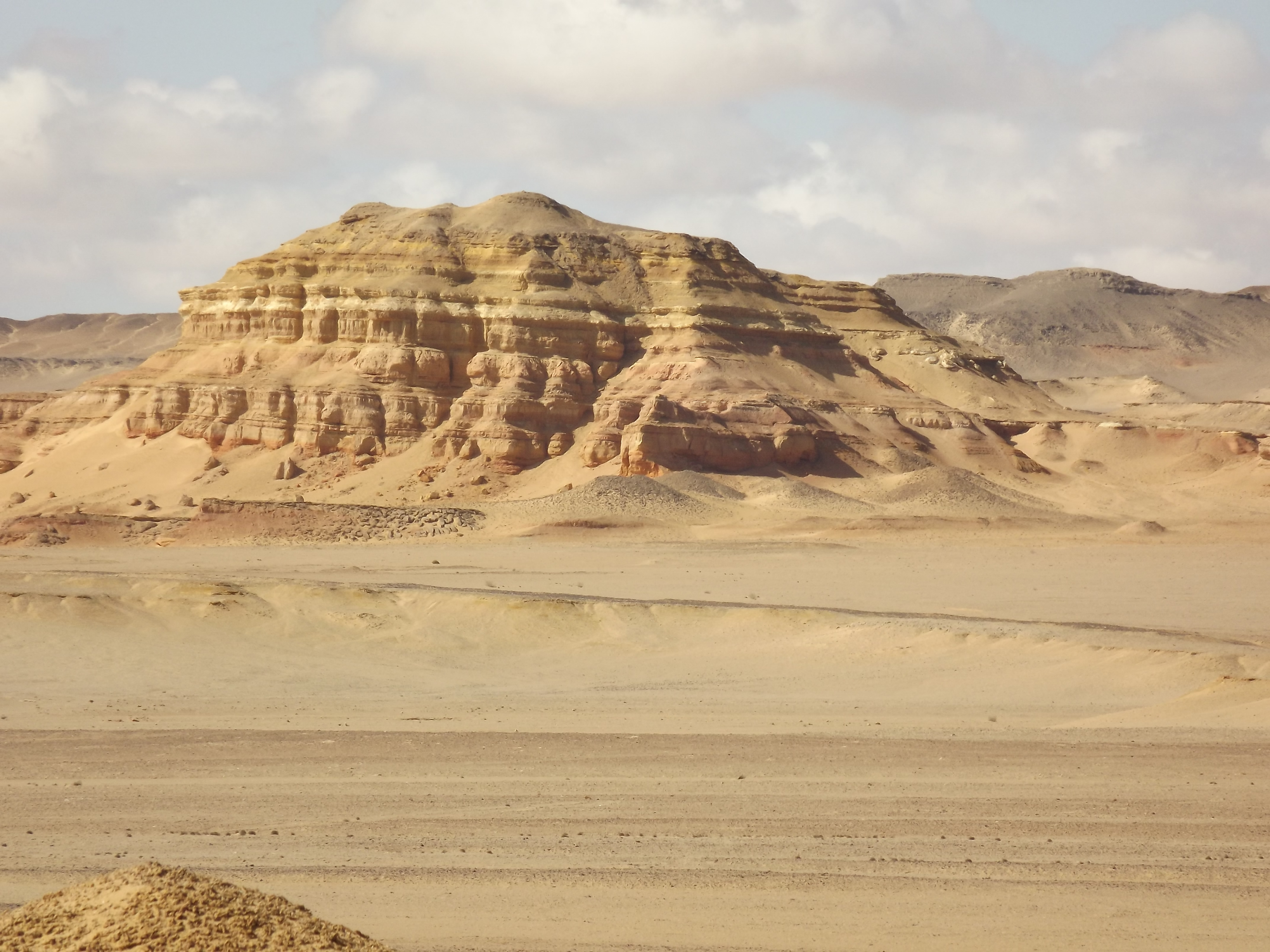
Outcrop of the Qasr-el-Sagha formation in the northern Fayum region

The Qasr-el-Sagha formation (also known as Carolia beds) completes the Maadi Group. It is exposed at the Qasr el-Sagha Escarpment and is up to 200 m (660 ft) thick. The rock unit consists of sandstones, sandy clay/siltstones and calcareous layered rocks with interbedded layers of limestones. Four sub-units can be distinguished. At the bottom is the Umm Rigl Member, with a 30 to 65 m (98 to 213 ft) thick sequence of sandy, partly bioclastic, hard limestones, which alternate with gypsum and calcareous, finely layered clay and siltstones. This is followed by the Harab Member, which is a 30 to 40 m (98 to 131 ft) thick package of brown, structureless clays. The Temple Member in turn is similar in structure to the Umm Rigl Member. The hanging Dir Abu Lifa Member is up to 77 m (253 ft) thick, and is characterized by an alternating layer of cross-bedded sandstones and fine-grained, gypsiferous clay/siltstones and sandstones. The deposits originate from a shallow, coastal sea. The base of the formation was not uniformly assessed in the past. Some authors have dated it to the first appearance of the shell Carolia, others to a clayey limestone a few meters higher. The upper transition to the next rock unit is discontinuous.

==== Gebel-Qatrani formation ====
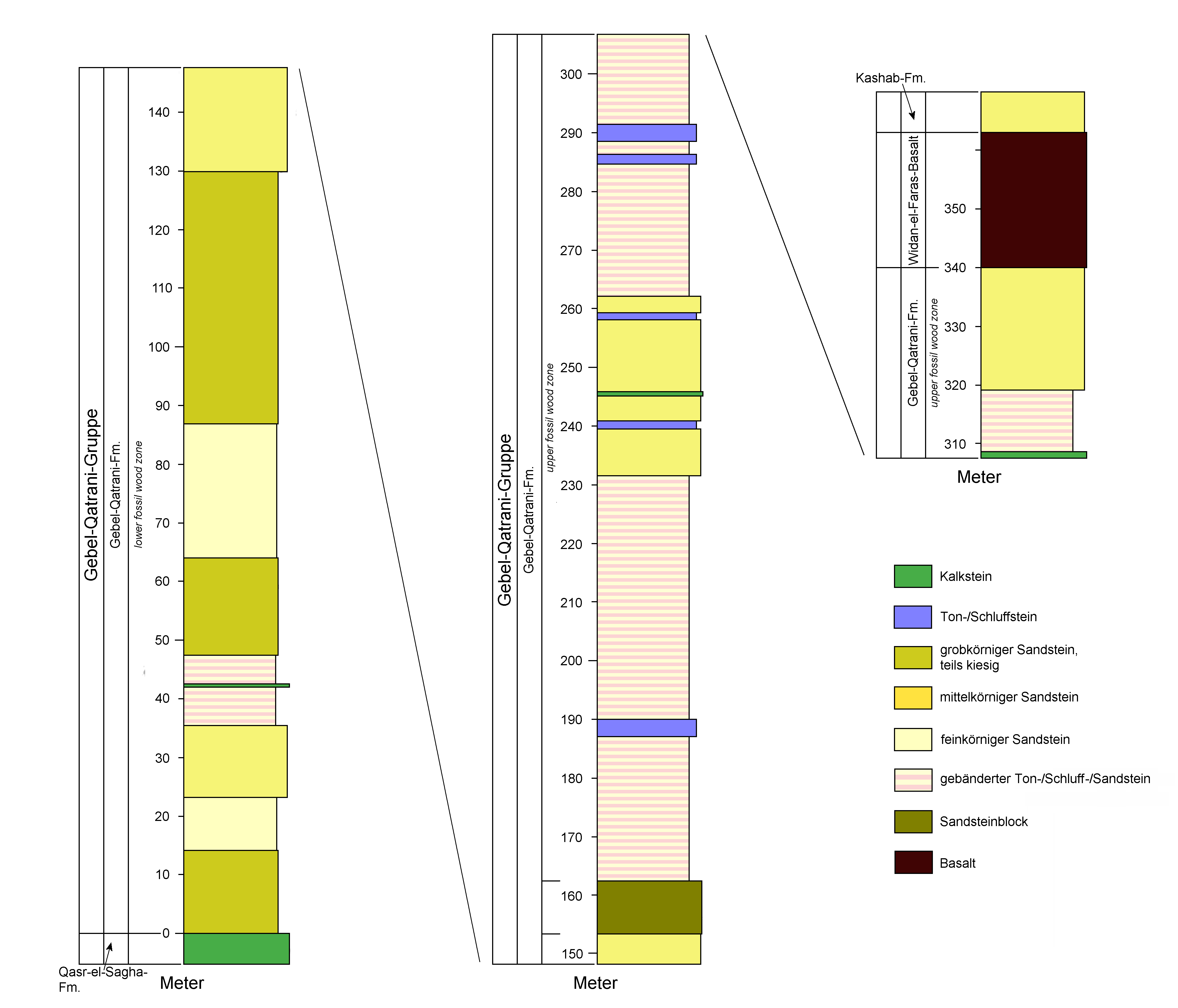
Geological structure of the Oligocene Gebel-Qatrani Formation and overlying strata in the Widan el-Faras area

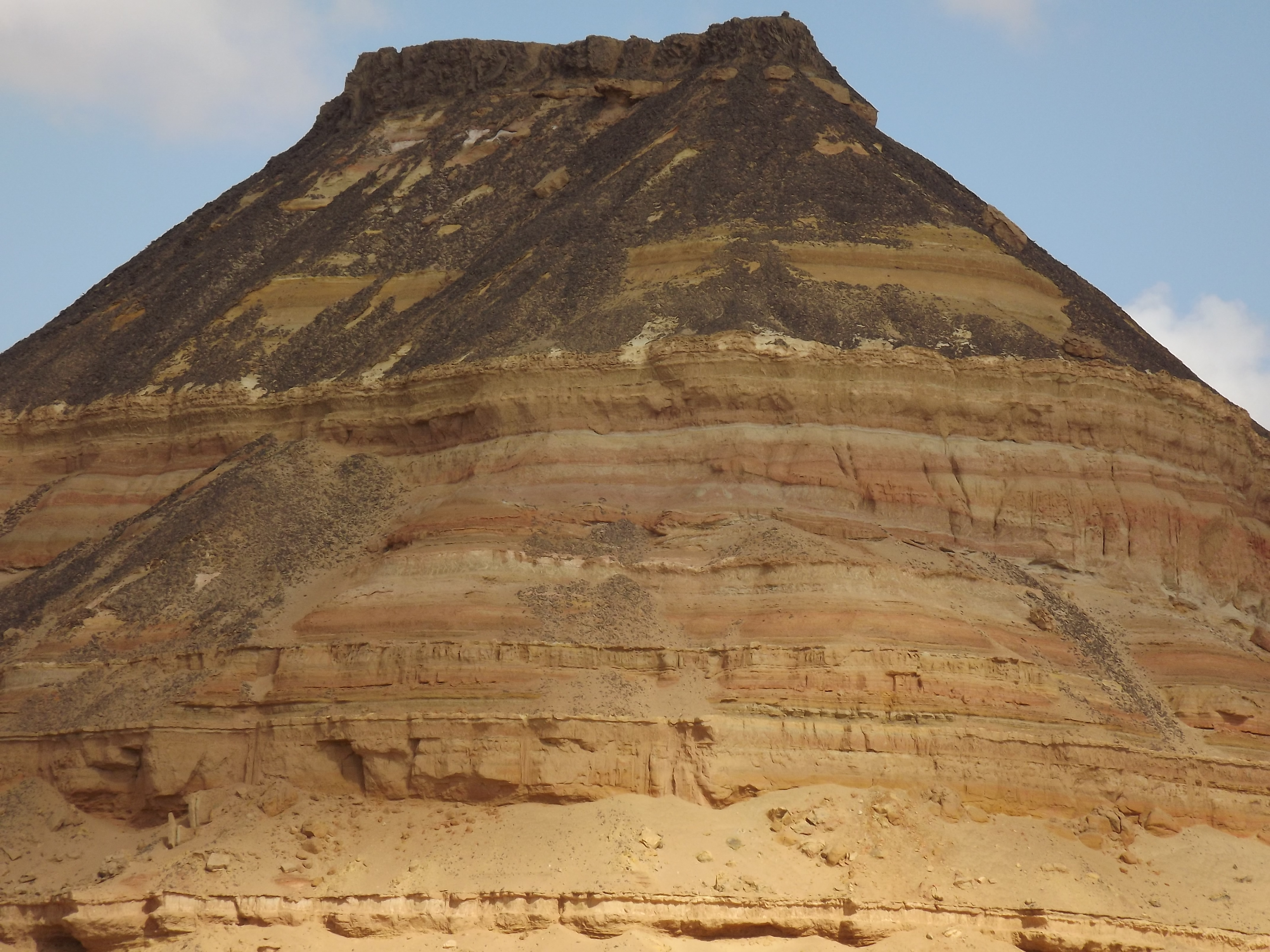
Banded sandstones of the Gebel-Qatrani Formation at Widan el-Faras in the northern Fayum region, the uppermost layer is formed by the Widan el-Faras basalt

The Qasr-el-Sagha formation is overlain by the Gebel Qatrani Formation (also known as the fluvio-marine series). It reaches a thickness of 340 m (1,120 ft) and forms the highest escarpment with the Gebel Qatrani Escarpment. Towards the west, the formation thins out considerably and becomes less than 100 m (330 ft) thick in places. It differs from the Qasr-el-Sagha Formation in its composition of various fine to coarser sandstones and clay/siltstones. In principle, three zones can be distinguished: a lower zone consisting of coarse, loose sandstones (the lower fossil wood zone, thickness 153 m (502 ft)), a middle zone consisting of a banky, medium to coarse-grained and in part extremely gypsiferous sandstone as a marker horizon (thickness 7 to 10 metres (23 to 33 ft)) and an upper one, consisting of an alternation of sandstone, sandy clay/siltstone with intercalated lenses of coarse sandstone and limestone (the upper fossil wood zone, thickness 190 m (620 ft)). The names lower and upper fossil wood zone are derived from the fossilized tree trunks found here. Both the lower and the upper series can be broken down into numerous sub-units. Particularly noteworthy are several sequences of color-banded sedimentary sequences, which are distributed over the entire Gebel-Qatrani Formation and are referred to as variegated sequences. Especially in the upper fossil wood zone, they are up to 70 m (230 ft) thick. The variegations are due to fossil soil formation processes and the associated displacement and accumulation of soluble iron compounds. There is also further evidence of paleo-soils, such as clay deposits. The soils show different stages of development from initial (Inceptisols) to developed soil formations (Spodosols and Ultisols). Overall, the secondary soil overprints indicate a clearly terrestrial depositional environment of the Gebel-Qatrani Formation. It can, therefore, be regarded as a continental-fluviatile sedimentary sequence that was formed by the action of numerous rivers and watercourses.

==== Widan-el-Faras-Basalt ====
The upper end of the Eocene-Oligocene series is marked by the Widan el Faras Basalt Formation, separated from the underlying Gebel-Qatrani Formation by a layer gap. It consists of dense, extremely fine-grained and ferruginous basalts. Individual intercalated sand horizons show that the basalts form several flows, but their thickness and character are highly variable. The greatest thickness is reached at 25 m (82 ft) but, in some places, the Widan-el-Faras basalt can be only 2 m (6.6 ft) thick.

=== Cover layers ===
The Neogene overlying layers lie on top of the Palaeogene sedimentary sequence. In the Fayum area, they are assigned to the Kashab Formation, which is, in turn, distinguished from the Widan-el-Faras basalts by a hiatus. In areas where the basalt is not formed, it directly covers the Gebel Qatrani Formation. Mainly the Kashab Formation consists of alluvial sediments, the lower 10 to 12 m (33 to 39 ft) are indicated by a bouldery conglomerate. Their total thickness is over 100 m (330 ft). The Kashab Formation forms the northern hinterland of the Fayum region.

=== Development of the Fayum depression in the Pleistocene and Holocene ===
During the alternating cold and warm phases of the Pleistocene, the shape of today's Fayum Basin was formed. The extreme dry periods during the cold periods led to the deflation of the basin several times down to the groundwater level. During the wetter warm periods, the basin filled with water and formed a swamp area. These swamp areas were still detectable in historical times and also led to the naming of the Fayum region (from the Egyptian phiom for "swamp"). The most recent formation of the Holocene is known as Lake Moeris. Its natural development began in the Lower Holocene and took place in several phases, which can be traced mainly by the distribution of diatoms, but also by old shorelines. They led to fluctuating lake levels, which is partly related to the formation and interruption of the natural connection to the Nile. The oldest is the "Palaeomoeris", which existed from 8,830 to 8,220 years BP. During this period, the lake level reached a high of 17 m (56 ft) above sea level. This was followed by the "Pre-Moeris" phase (between 8,200 and 7,500 years BP) and the "Protomoeris" phase (7,500 to 7,140 years BP), during which the lake level fluctuated at times between 28 and 8 m (92 and 26 ft) above sea level. The last phase comprises the "Moeris" phase, which began around 6,095 BP and lasted until around 5,500 years BP. Here the lake surface was up to 20 m (66 ft) above sea level and formed a lake with an area of 2,100 km^{2} (810 sq mi) and a volume of 53 km^{3} (13 cubic miles). In the following period, however, it dropped again by several meters, due to the loss of the connection to the Nile, and a swampy area developed.

In the Ancient Egyptian period, new land was made accessible and arable through water management construction measures, among other things. This happened, for example, in the Middle Kingdom through the construction of the Bahr Yusuf along the old entrance to the Nile and through a drainage system in the Fayum basin. In this way, approximately 450 km^{2} (170 sq mi) of land could be utilized. Later, the construction of an 8 km (5.0 mi) long dam at el-Lahun and the creation of further fresh water basins in the south-east of the Fayum area were added. By the Ptolemaic period, the usable area had thus been extended to around 1,300 km^{2} (500 sq mi), which corresponds to a large part of the cultivated land today. At this time, Lake Moeris had shrunk to around 415 km^{2} (160 sq mi) and occupied the area of today's Lake Qarun. Further declines characterized the Roman Empire era, during which the water surface sank from 7 m (23 ft) below sea level to 17 m (56 ft). In the first half of the 19th century, it was already at around 40 m (130 ft), while the low point of 46 m (151 ft) below sea level was reached in the 1930s. As a result, Lake Qarun developed from a former freshwater reservoir into a highly saline body of water, partly due to the lower water inflow compared to evaporation and partly due to the discharge of chemically contaminated agricultural wastewater. Apart from this, the lake is an important refuge for migratory birds and waterfowl. It serves as a breeding area for the little ringed plover and the kentish plover as well as the red-winged pratincole and the little tern, while the great crested grebe and the black-necked grebe spend the winter here.

== Fossil sites ==
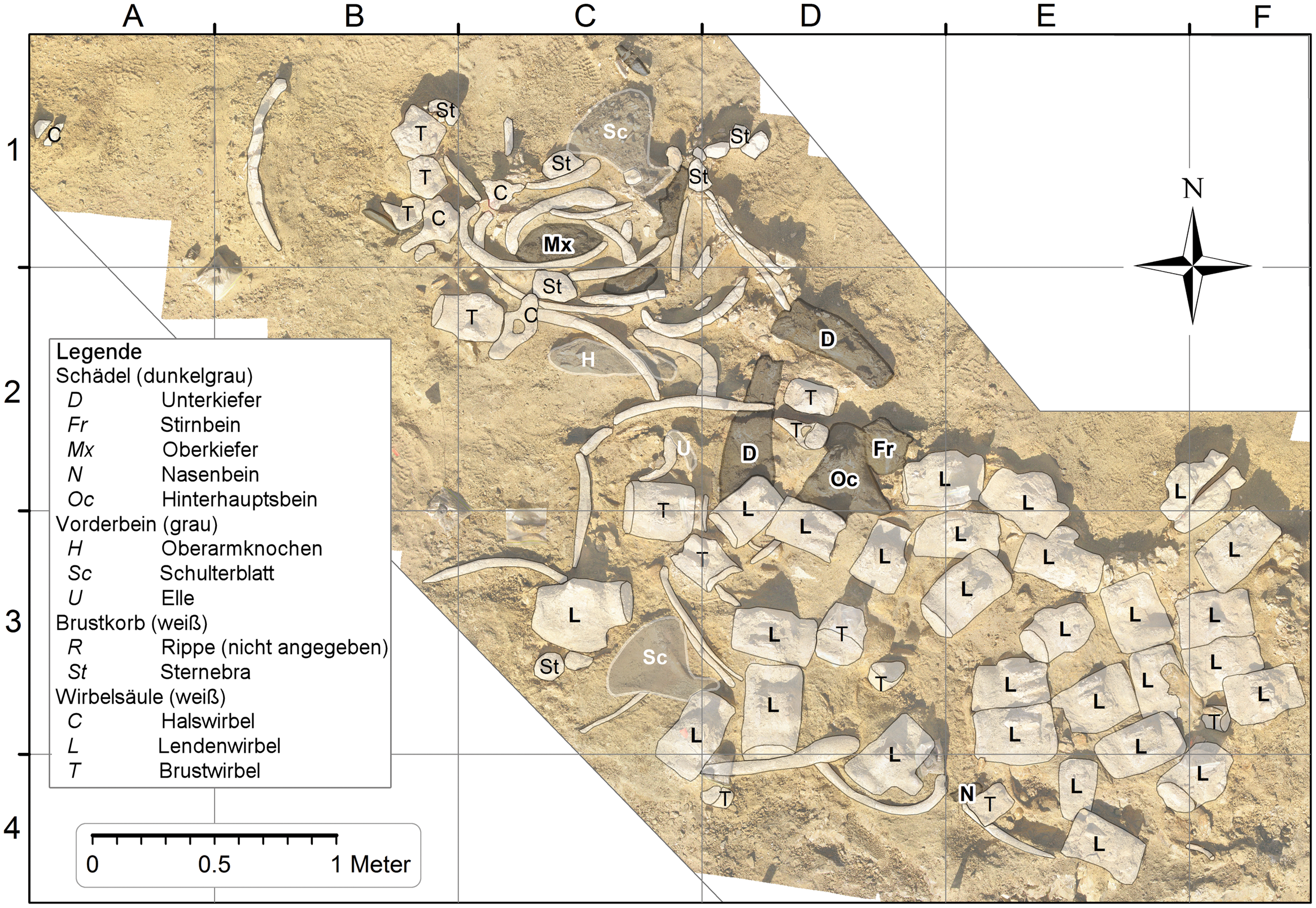
Plan of a whale skeleton found in the Gehannam Formation in Wadi el-Hitan

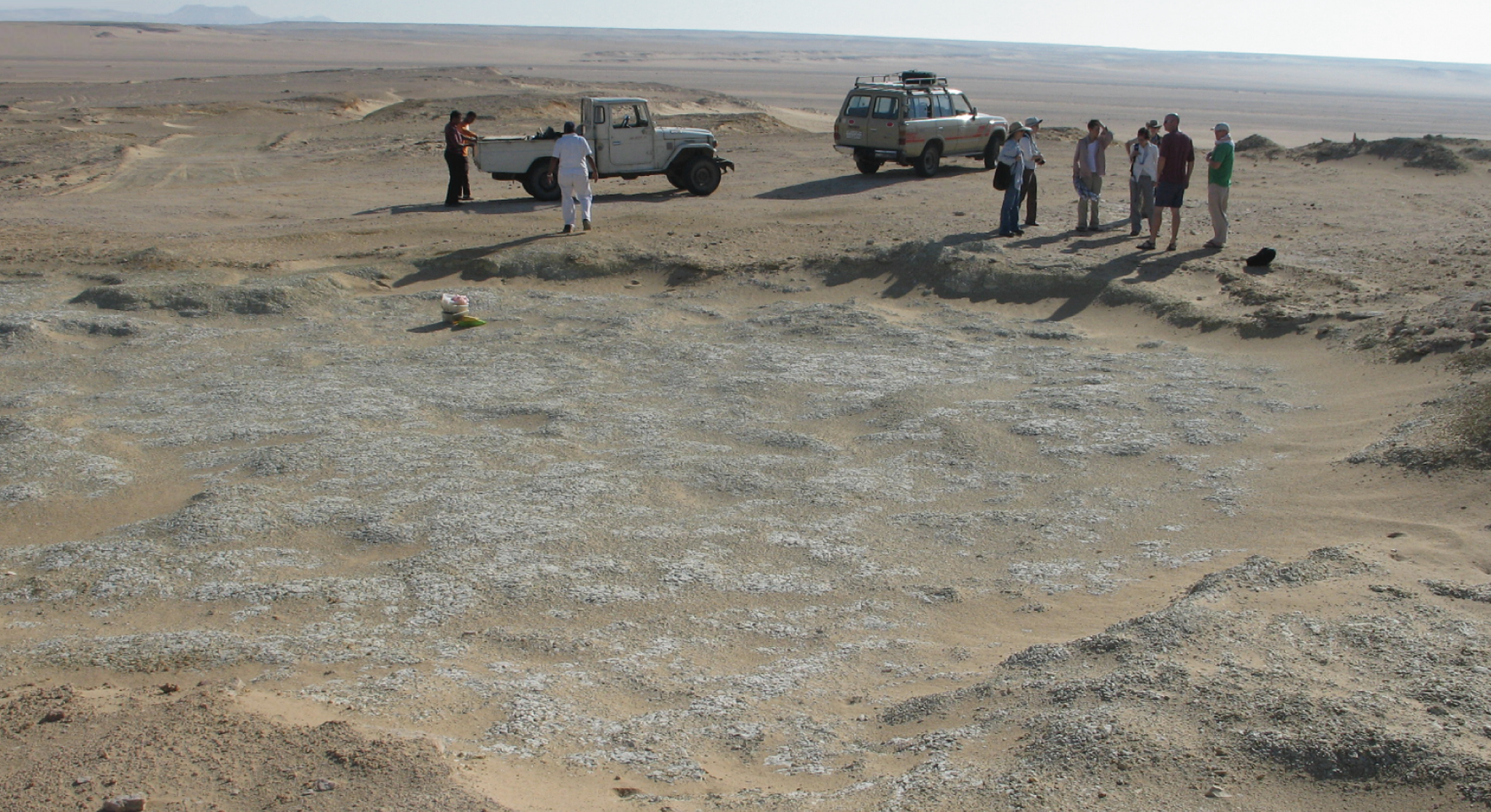
Site L-41 of the Gebel-Qatrani Formation

The fossils come from several geological formations. Plant fossils only occur in large numbers in the Gebel-Qatrani Formation. On the other hand, invertebrates can be found in almost all rock units, while vertebrates are more limited. Sea forms are distributed among the lower units and are common in the Muweilih, Gharaq, Gehannam and Birket-Qarun Formations, but they are also preserved from the Qasr-el-Sagha Formation. Sometimes, the larger marine mammals in particular have been preserved in complete skeletons. The Qasr-el-Sagha Formation and the subsequent Gebel-Qatrani Formation are the main areas where terrestrial organisms were found; the material is predominantly fragmented and disarticulated, so that certain rearrangements can be assumed. There are countless sites and outcrops in the entire Fayum area. They are located in the various stratigraphic units and are generally concentrated to the north and west of Lake Qarun. Over 100 sites have been documented for terrestrial mammals alone. These are spread over a few isolated sites in the Birket-Qarun Formation, and a little less than a dozen in the Qasr-el-Sagha Formation. The vast majority, over 90%, belong to the Gebel-Qatrani Formation. Of great importance is the site BQ-2 from the Umm Rigl Member of the Qasr-el-Sagha Formation (individual, mainly paleontological studies refer the Umm Rigl Member to the Birket-Qarun Formation, which is attributed to inadequate excavation conditions at the site itself) near the easternmost tip of Lake Qarun. BQ-2 was only discovered in the year 2000, and the most diversified vertebrate fauna of the entire Fayum region comes from there. Most of the other sites in the Qasr-el-Sagha Formation, with the exception of one unstratified site from the Temple Member, can be assigned to the Dir Abu Lifa Member. In general, however, land-living mammals are less common here.

Of the Gebel-Qatrani Formation sites, eight (A, B, E, G, I, M, V and L-41) are of particular interest, as they contain around 90% of the total finds of terrestrial vertebrates. The most important site here is L-41. It was discovered in 1983 by the geologist Thomas M. Bown. Bown had been involved in the research work carried out by Elwyn L. Simons since the 1960s, and became aware of this site through two lower jaws of shales. A more detailed description of the site was presented a few years later by D. Tab Rasmussen, among others. 47 m (154 ft) above the base of the rock unit, L-41 marks the oldest site of the formation to date, and it is also considered to be the most productive. The "A", "B" and "E" sites are located somewhat higher in the geological sequence, but still in the lower zone. They were opened at the beginning of the 20th century and are the oldest stratified fossil deposits in the history of research. Site "G", which is located around 16 m (52 ft) above the sandstone bench that separates the lower from the upper zone, is also of some significance. The main investigations took place in the 1960s. Another 66 m (217 ft) higher are sites "I" and "M", which are therefore among the youngest within the Gebel-Qatrani formation.

In general, the fossil remains are diagenetic overprinted and permineralized, so that the organic material has been replaced by anhydrite and gypsum. However, the bones and teeth from the Dir Abu Lifa Member of the Qasr-el-Sagha Formation appear to have undergone a further diagenetic process. In many cases, the sulphates were replaced by carbonates. As a result, the surface structures of the bones and teeth were less well preserved than the finds from the Gebel-Qatrani Formation.

== Finds ==
=== Flora ===
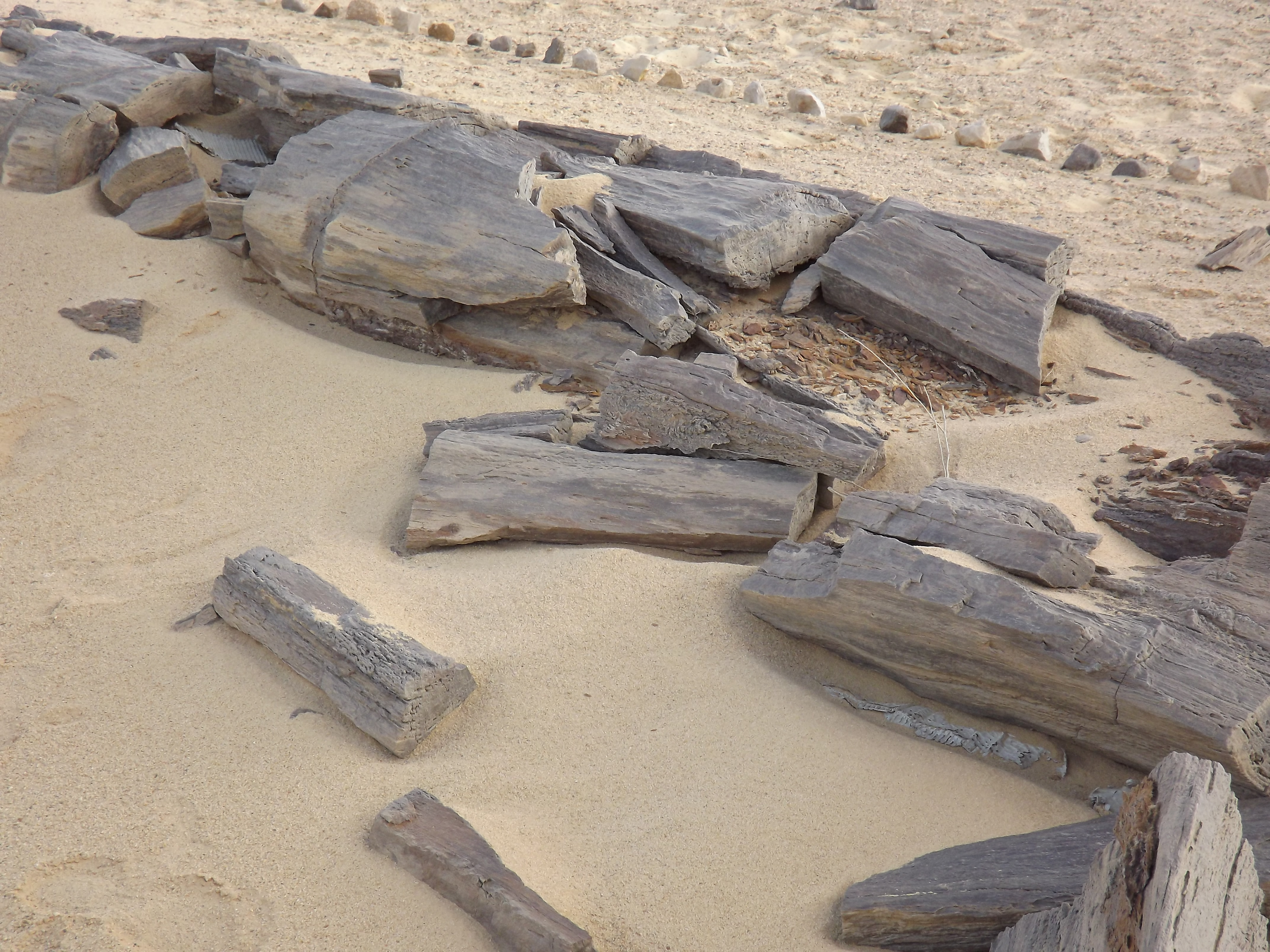
Fossilized tree trunk in the Fayum in its original position

Macroremains of plants are present in the form of wood, leaves, fruit and seed. Leaf remains from the Cymodoceaceae group are occasionally documented, especially from the older rock units, including from the "sea grasses" Thalassodendron and Cymodocea. Otherwise, plant remains are largely restricted to the Gebel-Qatrani Formation. The wood is of various sizes, ranging from small twigs to tree trunks 44 m (144 ft) long and over 2 m (6.6 ft) thick. The bark is still present on some of the trunks. Some of these tree trunks lie together as fossilized forests, consisting of up to 200 individual pieces in the lower sections of the Gebel-Qatrani Formation. The vegetation comprises around two dozen different families, with eight each identified among the wood, fruit and seeds and 13 among the leaves. Typical species include floating ferns such as Salvinia, which are bound to stagnant or slow-flowing waters, as well as mangrove ferns such as Acrostichum, which lives in brackish water. Among the monocotyledons, the palms stand out, of which the extinct genus Palmoxylon has been described. Other monocotyledons are found, such as the ivys from the arum group, which climb like lianas on trees. Some of their fragile fruits can still be recovered intact. However, dicotyledonous plants are most frequently found, including the lotus family, mallow family, carob family and sapote family. The entire flora shows links to the Indo-Malaysian region.

=== Fauna ===
==== Invertebrates ====
Invertebrates are found in all layers of rock, usually the remains of marine fauna. A large proportion of these are foraminifera, single-celled protozoa with shells, which occur in the Fayum both as planktonic and benthic forms. Planktonic foraminifera are represented by Truncorotaloides, Turborotalia and Globigerinatheka, and benthic ones by Operculina, Discocyclina and Nummulites. Some forms, such as Frondicularia or Pullenia, refer to quite great sea depths. In individual rock sections, the foraminifera are quite numerous, with up to over 30 species. Other invertebrates belong to the sea urchins, such as Schizaster, a representative of the heart sea urchins, or, more rarely, lance sea urchins. Molluscs are also documented. Among the bivalves, oysters, hatchet shells and saddle oysters are of great importance, with the latter Carolia forming an important stratigraphic indicator. Among snails, moon snails and tower snails can be found. In addition, cnidarians occur. Occasionally crayfish are preserved, as shown by individual shell parts of Lobocarcinus from the group of edible crabs in the Middle Birket-Qarun Formation. The carapaces have widths of 9 to 14 cm (3.5 to 5.5 in), with marked sexual differences in carapace shape.

==== Fish and amphibians ====
Fish also show a wide stratigraphic distribution in the Fayum area. The majority of the material found consists of teeth and isolated bones; articulated skeletal remains may also occur. Marine fish occur in all geological sections of the Fayum region, but are more common in the Mokattam Group and in the lower parts of the Maadi Group. The fauna is mainly characterized by sharks and rays. Large sharks can be found, such as the tiger shark, which is very common in the Midawara Formation. Other forms are sharpnose sharks, hammerhead sharks and mackerel sharks, the latter including a representative of the genus Otodus up to 5 m (16 ft) long. However, the most extensive finds can be attributed to the lemon sharks, which occur in a larger and smaller form and have their main distribution in the Maadi Group. In addition, a large number of medium-sized and smaller sharks have been documented, such as nurse sharks, thresher sharks, sand sharks, sixgill sharks and houndsharks. The genus Moerigaleus, which, typical of weasel sharks, had a dentition with a wide variety of teeth, of which over 60 are known to date, is striking. The fossil shark, which also belongs to this group, is another form whose current members mostly hunt cephalopods in the shelf area. Also worth mentioning are some requiem sharks, such as Carcharhinus and Misrichthys, which form a certain freshwater component and occur in comparatively larger numbers in the upper sections of the Maadi Group. Increased fossil evidence in these geological layers is also recorded for the related Abdounia. Large rays, mostly belong to the group of stingray-likes, include cow-nose rays, which occur quite frequently in the Midawara and Qasr-el-Sagha formations, but almost disappear in between. Other forms, such as Leidybatis or Lophobatis, on the other hand, are generally rare. Propristis and Anoxypristis, which represent the saw rays, have also been recorded. In contrast, Coupatezia and Hypolophodon belong to the stingray family, again indicating a stronger freshwater influence in the upper sections of the Maadi Group. A very rare faunal element is found with the electric ray.

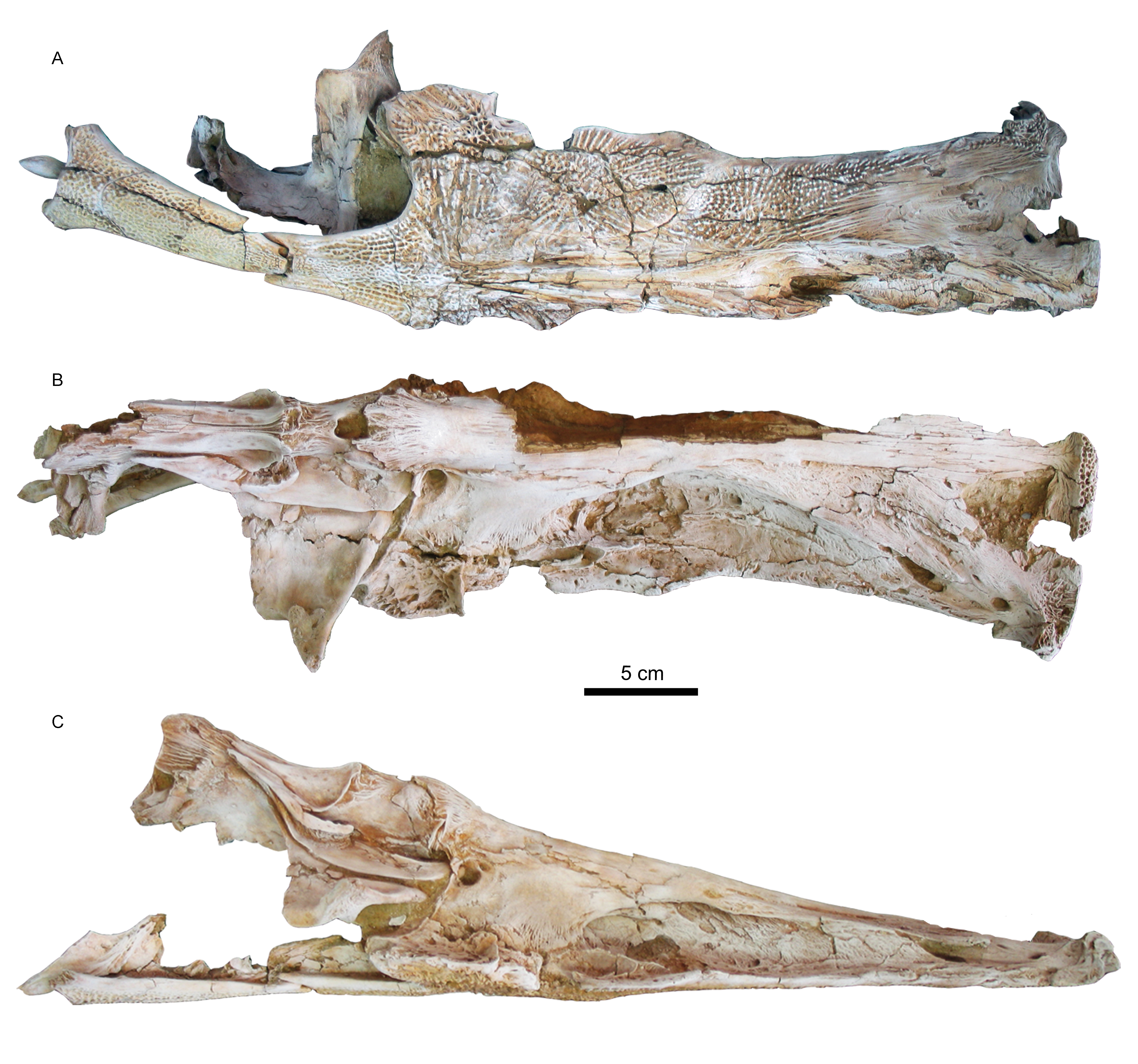
Skull of Qarmoutus from the Wadi el-Hitan

In general, marine elements recede into the background in the upper sections of the Maadi Group from the Qasr-el-Sagha Formation onwards, and freshwater or brackish water fish are increasingly found. Here, the bony fish dominate, with a wide variety of forms. However, remains of Pycnodus from the extinct group of Pycnodontiformes, which apparently fed on hard-shelled bivalves, are still present from the Gehannam Formation. The raft pike, such as Polypterus, could then be documented from the more recent deposit series. Also worthy of mention are the Large Nile pike and catfish-like, such as Chrysichthys and Auchenoglanis. An almost complete, 23 cm (9.1 in) long individual of Chasmoclupea, from the herring group, is available. Cross catfish, on the other hand, provide evidence that there was still a marine influence, which was documented by the genus Qarmoutus with a largely complete skeleton. This is also supported by the evidence of individual skull parts of Xiphiorhynchus, a relative of the swordfish, the longest piece measuring about 33 cm (13 in). The genus Lates has again survived, with several skulls, representing the oldest evidence of this representative of the giant perches in Africa. The same statement applies to Parachanna, a representative of the snakehead fish, of which individual skull parts have also survived from the Fayum. In addition, cichlids, African tetras and lungfish are also found.

Amphibians have rarely been studied so far. Remains of frogs have been reported from the Gebel-Qatrani Formation.

==== Reptiles and birds ====
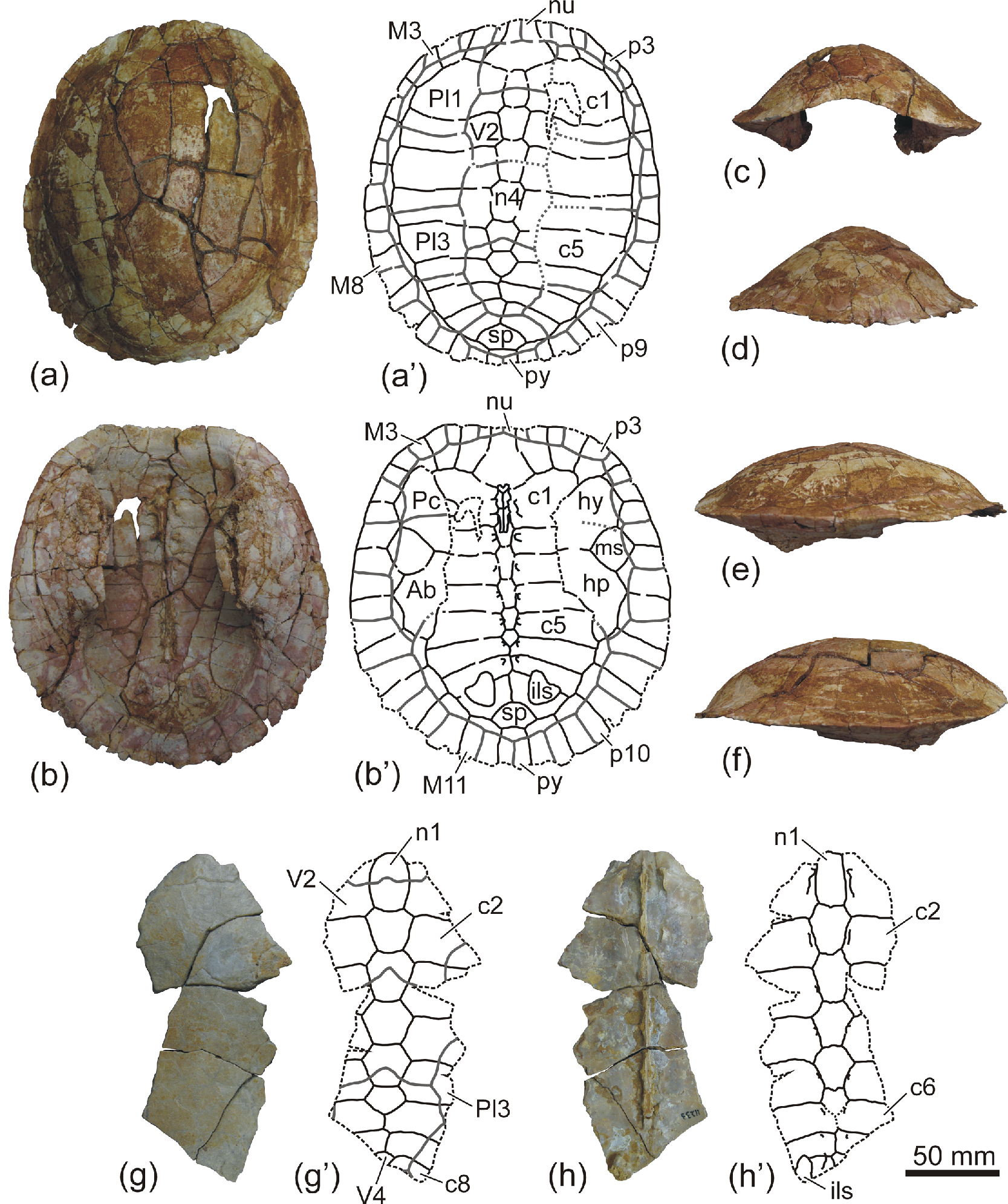
Armor remains of Shetwemys from the Fayum

The reptiles are again very diverse and represented by all the orders that still exist today. As a rule, the remains lie in the Qasr el-Sgha and Gebel-Qatrani formations, only rarely in older rock strata. The extensive material of the turtles consists mainly of the shell remains, but skulls and elements of the body skeleton are also present. There are representatives from both modern orders. The group of Halsberger tortoises includes Gigantochersina, a tortoise of the same size as the Galapagos tortoise. Several complete shells of up to 88 cm (35 in) in length have been preserved from this genus. Initially, the finds were attributed to the Palaearctic tortoises. Among the neck-turning turtles, the genera Cordichelys, Dacquemys, Albertwoodemys, Shetwemys and Stereogenys should be emphasized. All belong to the Podocnemididae family, which mainly contains freshwater forms. They are mostly small to medium-sized forms, as a large form Stereogenys has a carapace length of up to 46 cm (18 in).

There are around 100 vertebral fragments of the pangolins. These include the oldest representatives of the monitor lizards. There is also a somewhat more primitive, as yet undetermined form. The finds suggest that the entire group originated in Africa. The snakes are also mainly documented via vertebrae, and the majority of the material is assigned to the Qasr el-Sagha Formation. Among them, the most impressive is Gigantophis, a giant snake, whose length is given as 6.9 m (23 ft) on average, large specimens may have reached 9 to 11 m (30 to 36 ft) in length. The animals probably lived underground. So far, no skull material is known, so nothing can be said about the dimensions and elongation of the mouth and thus about the prey size; however, other representatives of the Madtsoiidae did not have the adaptation to extreme mouth elongation as in today's giant snakes. Pterosphenus, on the other hand, was adapted to a life in water, as indicated by the laterally strongly compressed vertebrae. It also reached large sizes. In addition to these two most common representatives, there are also some smaller, as yet undetermined boas, as well as terrestrial boas. With Renenutet, a form of the viper and viper-like species also occurs, but only three vertebrae have survived to date.

Within the crocodiles, two groups of forms can be distinguished in the Fayum region. One consists of long-snouted representatives that are phylogenetically close to today's gavials. The oldest form, Paratomistoma, has been described from the Gehannam Formation of Wadi el-Hitan on the basis of a skull. Its location in marine sediments suggests an adaptation to marine life. All other finds are stratigraphically younger. Of importance here is Eogavialis, whose find material was originally attributed to the recent Sunda gavial. However, Eogavialis proved to be very basal in the evolution of the gavials, possibly belonging to a lineage even before the split into today's Southeast Asian and the extinct South American forms. The second group is represented by animals with broad snouts, which probably show a closer relationship to the true crocodiles. Initially assigned to today's genus Crocodylus, however, these are very probably more phylogenetically original members. In addition to these forms, a lower jaw fragment of a previously unnamed member of the Sebecosuchia provides one of the rare records of this group from Africa. Together with several finds from South America, the piece from the Fayum is also one of the most recent examples of a representative of this primitive and more distant crocodilian relative.

Fossils of birds are rather sparse, with individual leg and foot bones and sometimes with skull fragments. The earliest evidence of birds in the region is a tibiotarsus from the Birket Qarun Formation of Wadi el-Hitan. The genus Eopelecanus was established for it, and it is also one of the oldest records of pelicans. Almost all of the other finds come from the Gebel-Qatrani Formation and are distributed across around half a dozen orders. Only a few objects can be precisely identified. These include the genera Nupharanassa and Janipes, which are close to the leaf-chickens within the plovers. The wading birds, on the other hand, are represented by Xenerodiops, which was somewhat smaller than today's storks and is documented by a skull and a humerus. Another skull is attributed to Palaeoephippiorhynchus, also a relative of storks. Some other finds are in turn associated with the present-day genus Nycticorax and thus with the herons. Shoebills, which are a rather rare fossil element, also belong to the same family group. They are represented with Goliathia in the Fayum. In addition, birds of prey (including hawk-likes and ospreys) and crane birds (with the rails) are present, as are turacos and flamingos. In addition to the known bird groups, some surviving forms cannot be precisely classified. One example is Eremopezus, a probably flightless bird with the dimensions of today's Nandus. This bird, equipped with long and slender legs, the Tarsometatarsus alone measuring a good 34 cm (13 in), did not resemble any of the known groups of large ratites. A similar form, originally named Stromeria, from the Fayum region was initially even considered the basal form of Madagascan elephant birds. Today, Stromeria is regarded as a synonym of Eremopezus. It is probably an independent development within the bird world of Africa. Another, probably flightless, bird, indicated by a heavily fragmented leg bone, could belong to the extinct Ameghinornithidae; these have so far only been described from Europe.

==== Mammals ====
The mammals are very extensive and are documented with more than a dozen orders, some of which are now extinct. They occur in all areas of the Maadi group. A distinction must be made between sea-dwelling and land-dwelling forms. The former are mainly found in the lower (Gehannam and Birket-Qarun formations) and the latter in the upper (Qasr-el-Sagha and Gebel-Qatrani formations) sections. The most primitive group are the marsupials, of which there are at least two representatives. These include Peratherium, which represents the first marsupial ever recorded in Africa and is closely related to the marsupial rat group. Ghamidtherium probably has a similar relationship. Both forms are only known from several lower jaws and individual upper jaws. The assignment of Ghamidtherium to the marsupials is partly questioned, and other authors group the remains with the insectivores. With the Ptolemaiida, an extinct order of small, probably insectivorous mammals was introduced, whose systematic position was initially unclear. Characteristic are the oversized central molars from the posterior premolars to the anterior molar, while the other molars remain relatively small. At least three genera have been described from the Fayum. The best known is the type form Ptolemaia, the first evidence of which dates back to the beginning of the 20th century in the form of dental remains. Later, skull finds also came to light. Other forms from the Fayum are Qarunavus and Cleopatrodon. What is remarkable about the Ptolemaiida found in the Fayum is that they almost all came to light within a radius of around 1 km (0.62 mi), so that the animals may have been ecologically restricted. Today, the Ptolemaiidae are associated with the Afrotheria, which can be seen from the pattern of the tooth eruption, among other things.

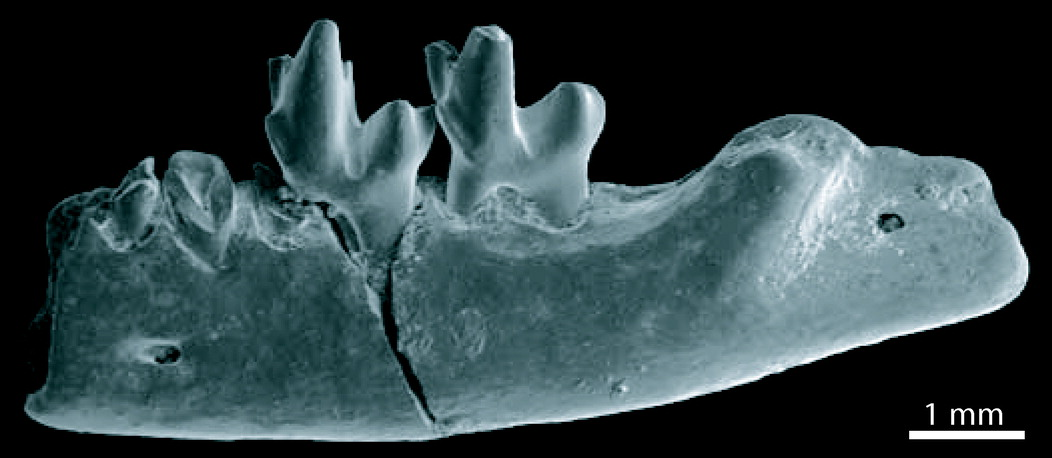
Lower jaw remains of Dilambdogale from the Fayum

The actual Afrotheria form one of the main groups of finds in the fossil community of Fayum. Fragments of the teeth of the small, insectivorous forms have mostly survived. This applies to Eochrysochloris, as a primitive member of the golden mole-rats, as well as to some other, more distant relatives of the tenrec-likes. These include Dilambdogale, Widanelfarasia or Qatranilestes. Both the modern golden mole-rats and the Tenrek-like species are characterized by three distinctive cusps and a V-shaped shear band on each molar (zalambdodontes tooth pattern), but the latter three fossil genera still have a more primitive W-shaped shear band on the front molars (dilambdodontes tooth pattern). Herodotius can, in turn, be regarded as a very early representative of the proboscidean. The genus is based on several skull and lower jaw fragments. Another mandible and a tooth are known from Metoldobotes, a much more modern and larger form.

The fossil record of the hyracoid in the Fayum is outstanding; in the Gebel-Qatrani Formation alone they account for almost a third of all mammal finds. The shales are among the most important biostratigraphic elements of Palaeogene Africa. Skull and body elements of Dimaitherium are preserved. With its still elongated skull, it represents an archaic slough, the structure of its foot indicates a possible climbing locomotion with rapid but not persistent movements. Other early forms are Geniohyus, Bunohyrax or Pachyhyrax, often differing only in the modifications of the grinding teeth from a humped (bunodont) chewing surface pattern to one with a crescent-shaped shearing ridge (selenodont). Saghatherium and Thyrohyrax appear much more modern, which is indicated by the shortened skull. The former possibly represented a fast runner. In both representatives, chamber-like cavities are formed on the inside of the lower jaw, which only occur in males, but whose function is unclear. In Antilohyrax, the hind foot configuration suggests an animal that probably moves by jumping. Most of the shawls mentioned here were relatively small and only slightly larger than modern species. In contrast, Megalohyrax reached the size of a donkey, while Titanohyrax is estimated to have weighed over 800 kg (1,800 lb) and thus had the dimensions of a small rhinoceros. Most of the remains of the skull and teeth of both have been preserved.

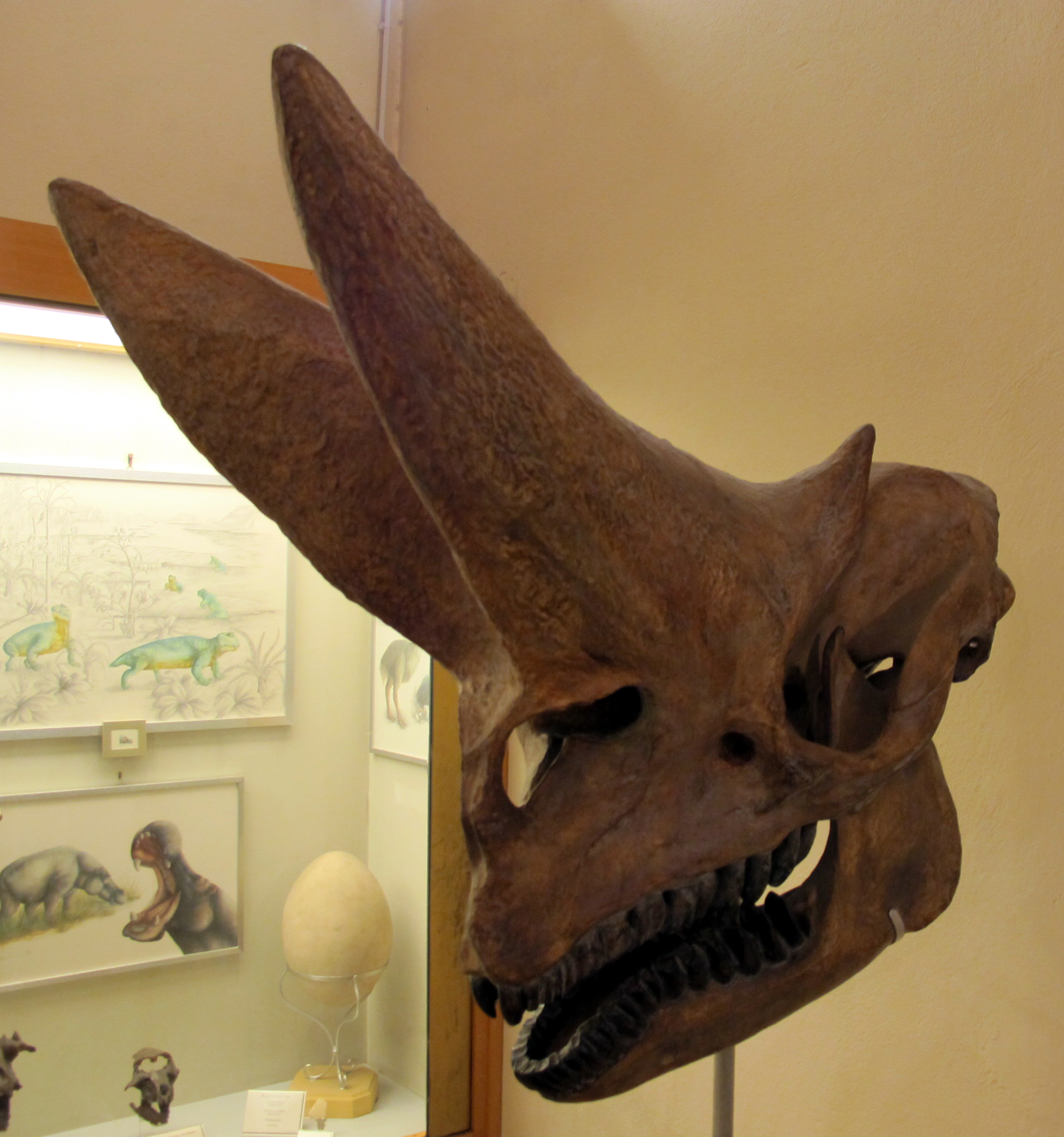
Skull of Arsinoitherium from the Fayum

One of the best known and probably most characteristic fossil forms of the entire Fayum region is Arsinoitherium, a huge animal with a body length of up to 3.4 m (11 ft). Almost the entire skeleton of the animal is known from several dozen individuals. Its main features are the two pairs of bony horns on the skull, the larger of which was formed from the nasal bone. Equally striking is the dentition, with 44 high-crowned teeth, with which the probably soft plant food was crushed. Externally, Arsinoitherium resembled rhinoceroses, to which it is not closely related in terms of skeletal structure, and is referred to its own extinct group of Embrithopoda. The Fayum region became extraordinarily important due to the fossils of proboscideans. They all belong to a very early developmental phase, whose common characteristic is the vertical tooth change. Moeritherium probably formed a side branch within this. It was externally pig-like and did not yet have a proboscis. In contrast, the much larger Barytherium looked more like a classic trunked animal, but it had a total of eight small tusks. Both forms were pronounced swamp dwellers. Two other known genera are Palaeomastodon and Phiomia. Both appear somewhat more modern, due to their anterior molars with three transverse ridges, compared to two in the previously mentioned representatives, and the tusks are also longer. It is partly assumed that the former is closer to the evolutionary line of mammoths, the latter to gomphotheres and elephants. The manatees occur in a wide stratigraphic range. Protosiren already occurs in the Gehannam Formation with some well-preserved skeletons. Its very early branching within the manatees is still recognizable, among other things, by the clearly developed fore and hind extremities and the strong spinous processes of the thoracic vertebrae, which probably allowed a semi-aquatic life. The other genera, Eosiren and Eotheroides, are both phylogenetically and stratigraphically younger and are closer to today's dugongs; they had a much reduced limb skeleton and more swollen bones. The up to 2.5 m (8.2 ft) long Eosiren may not have been purely sea-dwelling, but may also have occurred upriver. The various manatees of the Fayum fed on sea grasses, probably occupying different ecological niches.

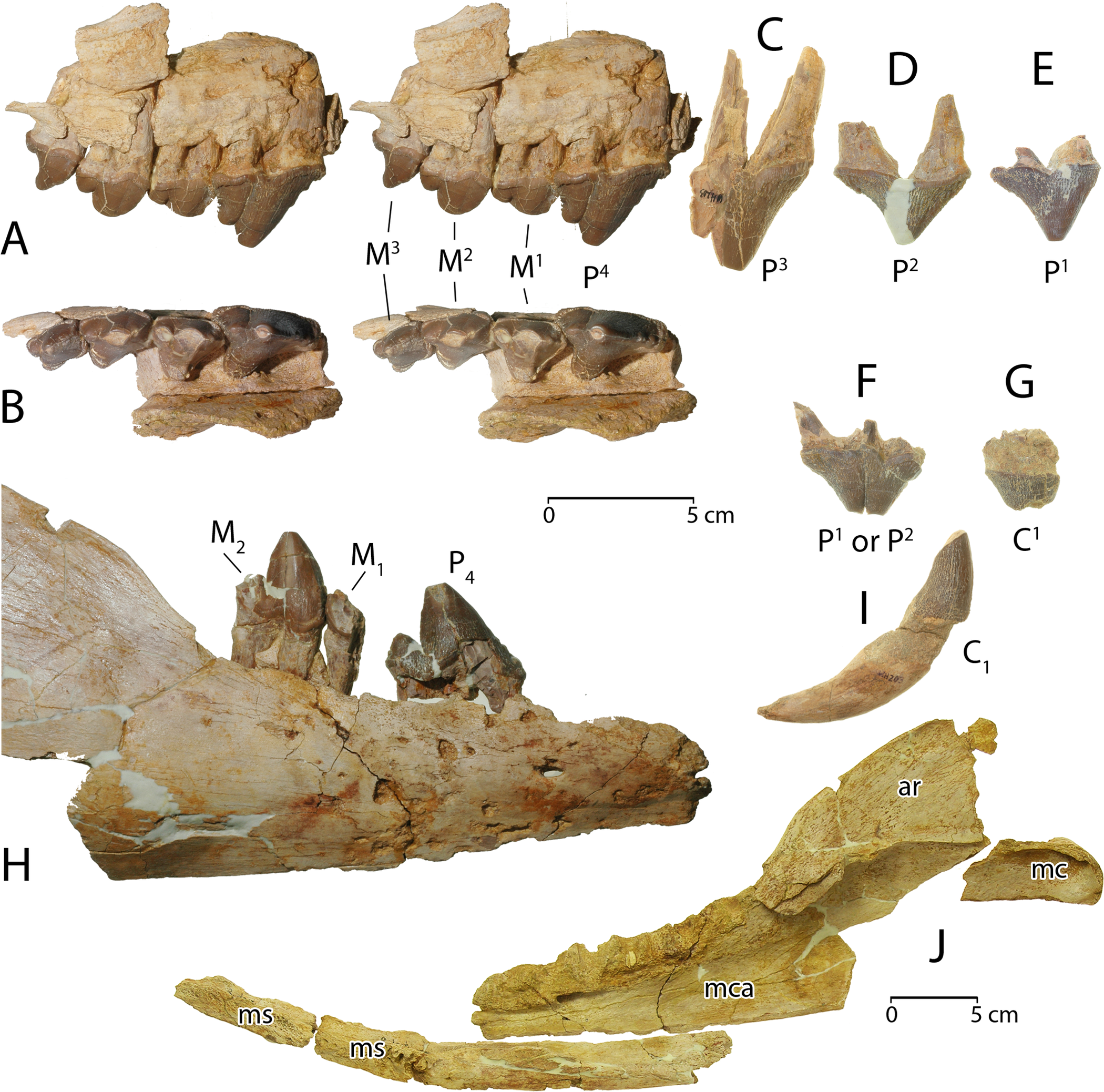
Dental remains of Aegicetus from the Fayum

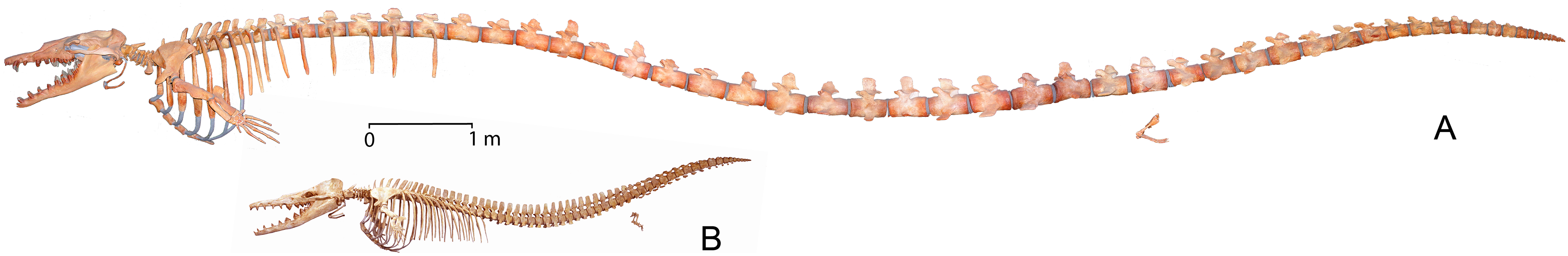
Skeleton of Basilosaurus and Dorudon from the Wadi el-Hitan in size comparison; the upper individual is 15 m long

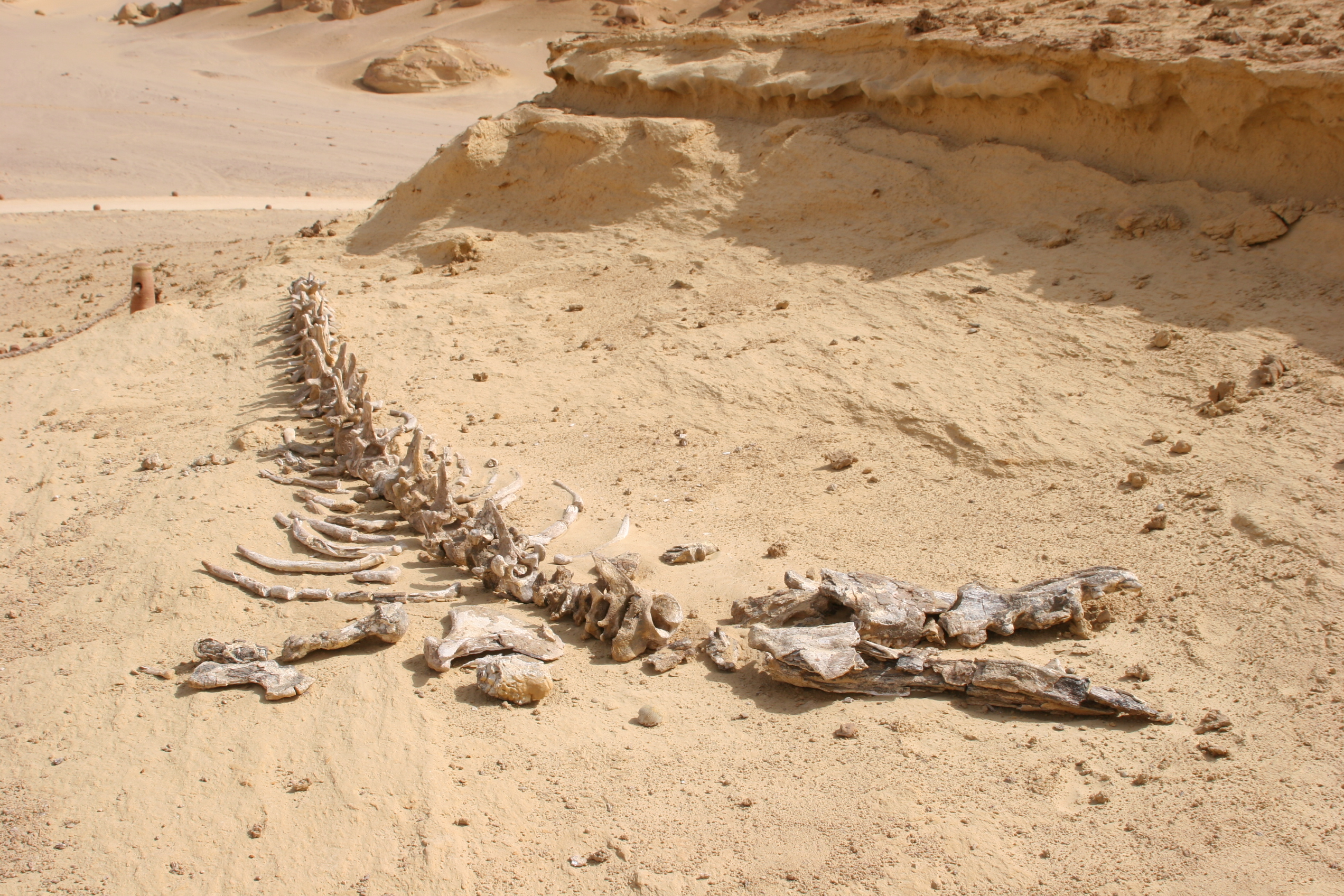
Skeleton of Dorudon from the Wadi el-Hitan in its original position

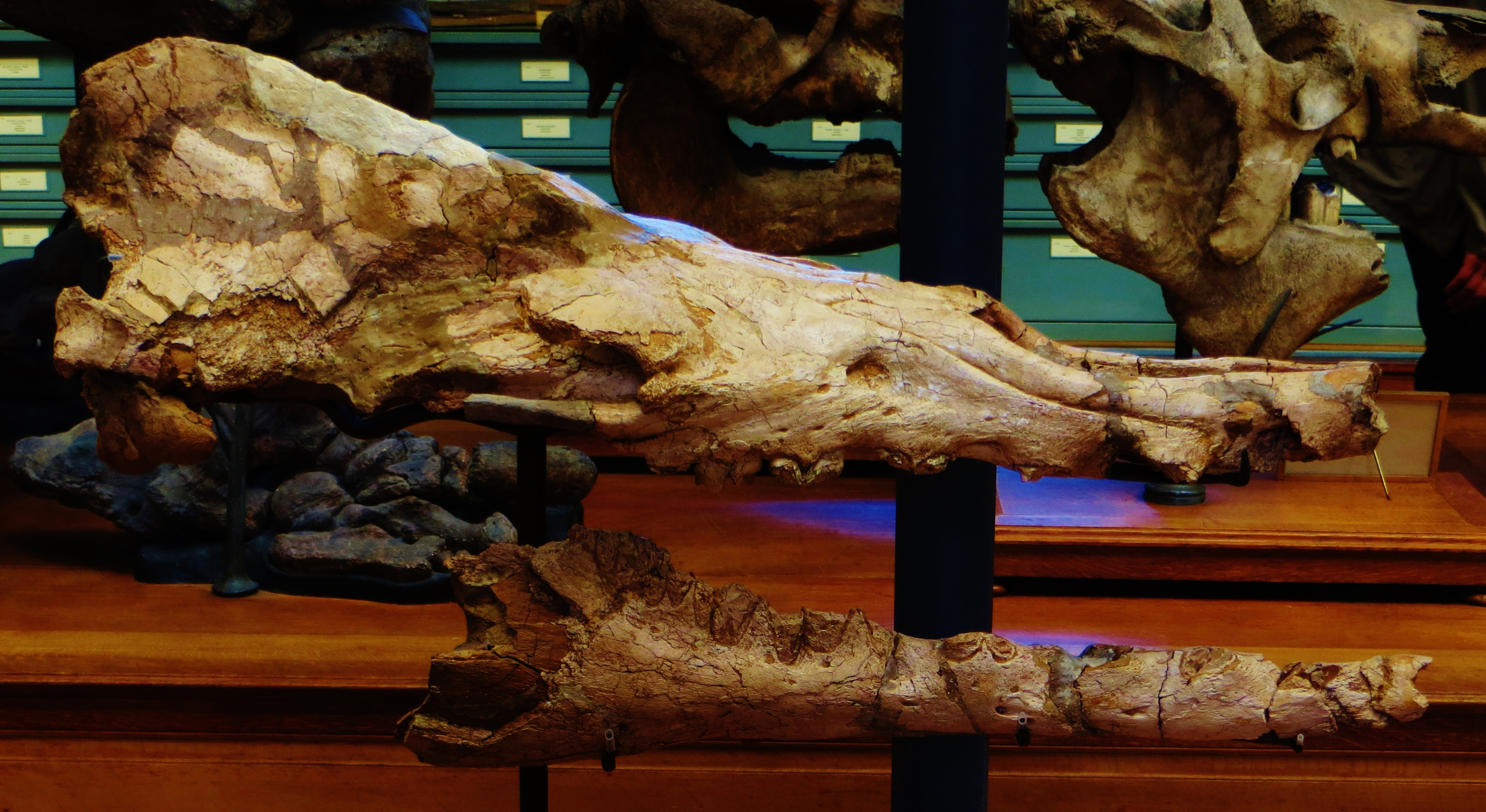
Skull of Saghacetus from the Fayum

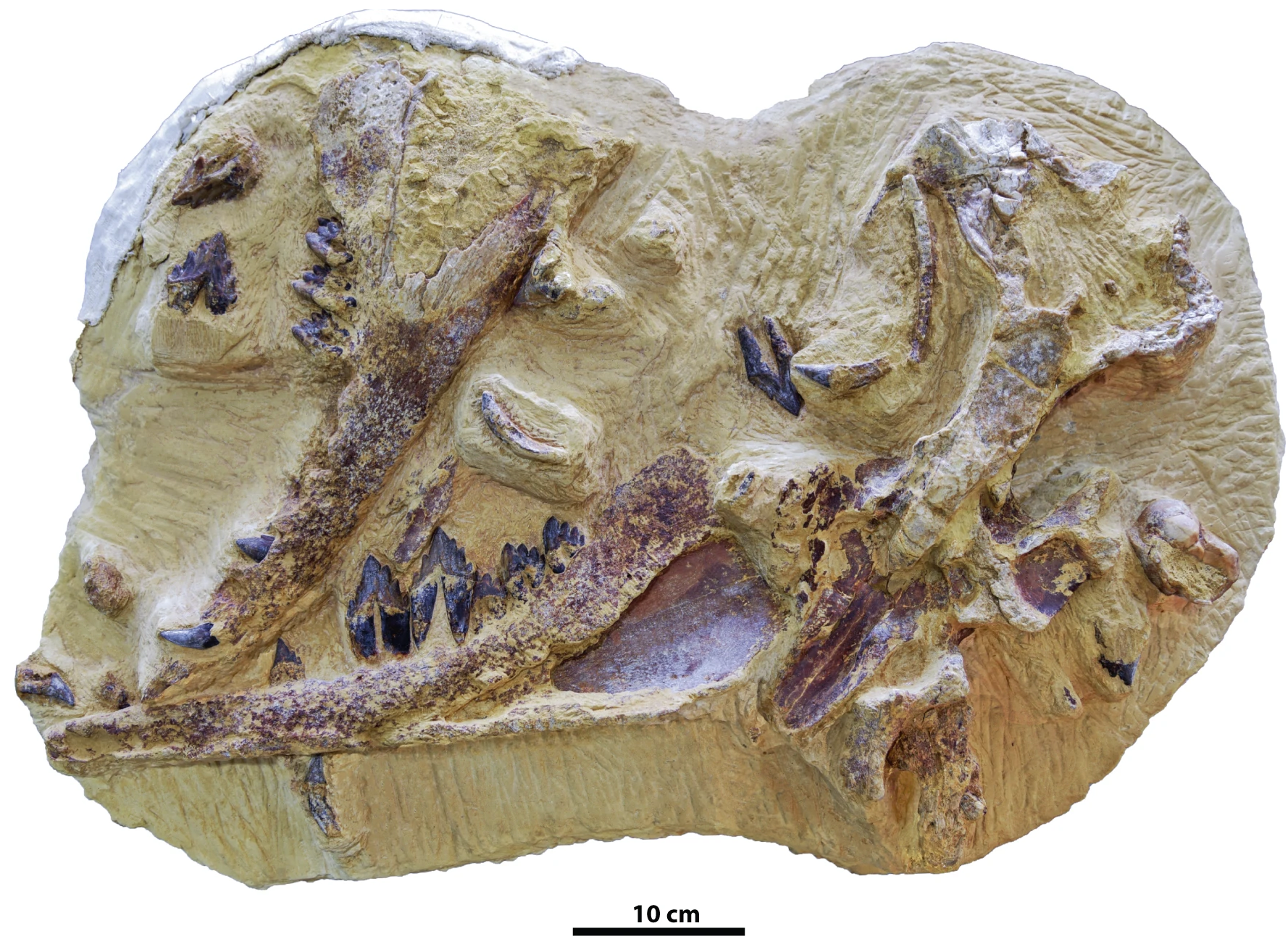
Partial skull of Tutcetus from the Fayum

In addition to the Afrotheria, with the manatees, sea-dwelling mammals also evolved within the Laurasiatheria with the whales. They are very abundant in the Fayum, with some complete skeletons. Occasional remains already occur in the Mokattam group: whales are very frequently found in the Gehannam and Birket-Qarun formations, but their proportion declines again in the Qasr-el-Sagha formation. A good 500 skeletons are known from the Wadi el-Hitan alone, allowing the size and individual development of the animals to be studied. Further finds came to light in the outcrops to the north and south of Lake Qarun. The forms described so far from the Fayum region belong to an original group of whales known as Archaeoceti. These differ from modern whales in that they have a complete set of teeth, teeth with numerous small cusps, and less specialized flipper and hind legs, on which the feet and toes were still developed. Fayum fossils were the first to provide evidence of fully developed hind limbs. In accordance with today's whales, the lumbar spine was already extremely elongated. The oldest finds come from the Midawara Formation in Wadi el-Rayyan. This can be seen, among other things, in the hind limbs of Rayanistes, a member of the Remingtonocetidae. These very primitive cetaceans are so far largely documented from the Indian subcontinent. The rock unit also contained a partial skeleton of Phiomicetus, which in turn can be assigned to the Protocetidae, another very original cetacean family group. It also includes Aegicetus, which so far has two individuals from the Gehannam Formation of Wadi el-Hitan. Weighing just under 900 kg (2,000 lb), the animals still had relatively equally large hands and feet. As a result, they moved less undulating in the water, but used their limbs even more for propulsion. In addition, the tail vertebrae were less flattened, so that possibly no fluke had yet been developed. Aegicetus also had a fully developed sternum, in contrast to later whales. The other whales from the Fayum area belong to the Basilosauridae: the best known and most common representatives here are Basilosaurus, an 18 m (59 ft) long giant, and Dorudon, which grew up to 5 m (16 ft) long. Based on stomach remains of Basilosaurus from the Wadi el-Hitan, it could be shown that the giant toothed whale hunted its smaller relative Dorudon and probably preferred to prey on its offspring. The extinct bony fish Pycnodus was also identified as a prey animal. This took Basilosaurus, whose estimated weight was 5.8 to 6.5 t (5.7 to 6.4 long tons; 6.4 to 7.2 short tons), and probably occupied the position of an apex predator in the seas of the late Eocene. Dorudon, on the other hand, probably fed mainly on fish and used the then shallow sea waters to give birth to its offspring, as individual finds of young animals suggest. It had a weight of around 1.1 to 2.2 t (1.1 to 2.2 long tons; 1.2 to 2.4 short tons), a small brain weighing only 980 g (35 oz) and was not yet capable of echolocation due to the structure of its skull. Ancalecetus was about the same size as Dorudon, but had a differently configured front leg. Saghacetus is quite small with a body length of 3 m (9.8 ft) and a presumed weight of 350 kg (770 lb) and occurs mainly in the Qasr-el-Sagha formation. Even shorter was Tutcetus which, with a length of 2.5 m (8.2 ft) and an estimated weight of 187 kg (412 lb), represents one of the smallest representatives of the Basilosauridae. A partial skeleton from the Wadi el-Rayyan refers to the form. Stromerius and Masracetus appear rather rarely; individual teeth and parts of the body skeleton of the latter were found in the Gehannam Formation north of Lake Qarun. The closest relatives of the whales are found in the even-toed ungulates, of which only representatives of the Anthracotheriidae are documented in the Fayum, which are in the evolutionary line to the hippopotamuses. The outwardly pig-like animals were probably also adapted to a semi-aquatic life, due to their physique. While there are only a few finds of Qatraniodon and Nabotherium each, the fossil material of Bothriogenys consists of more than 2,000 tooth and bone elements, as well as individual complete skulls of animals of all ages.

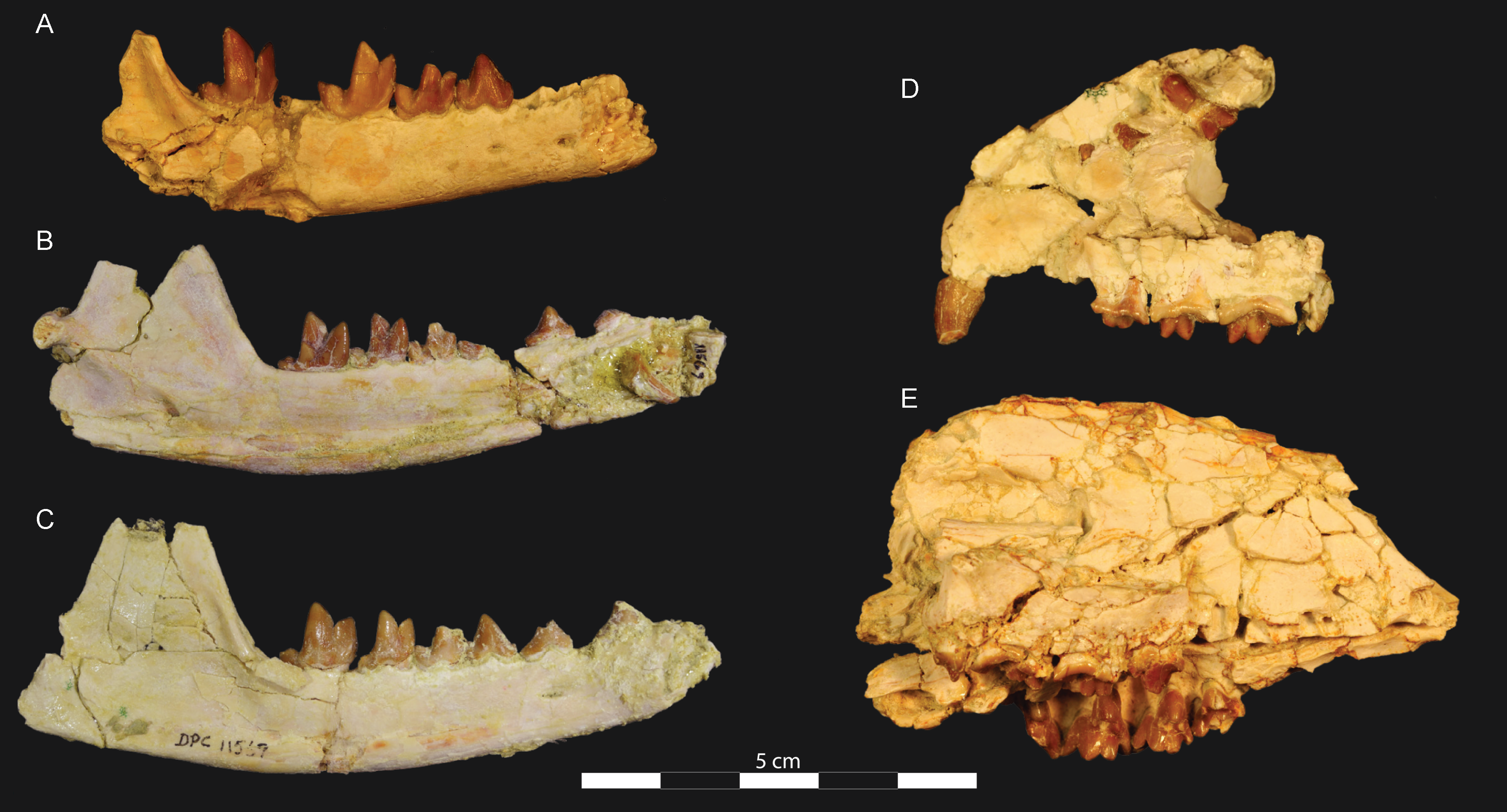
Lower jaw and skull remains of Brychotherium from the Fayum

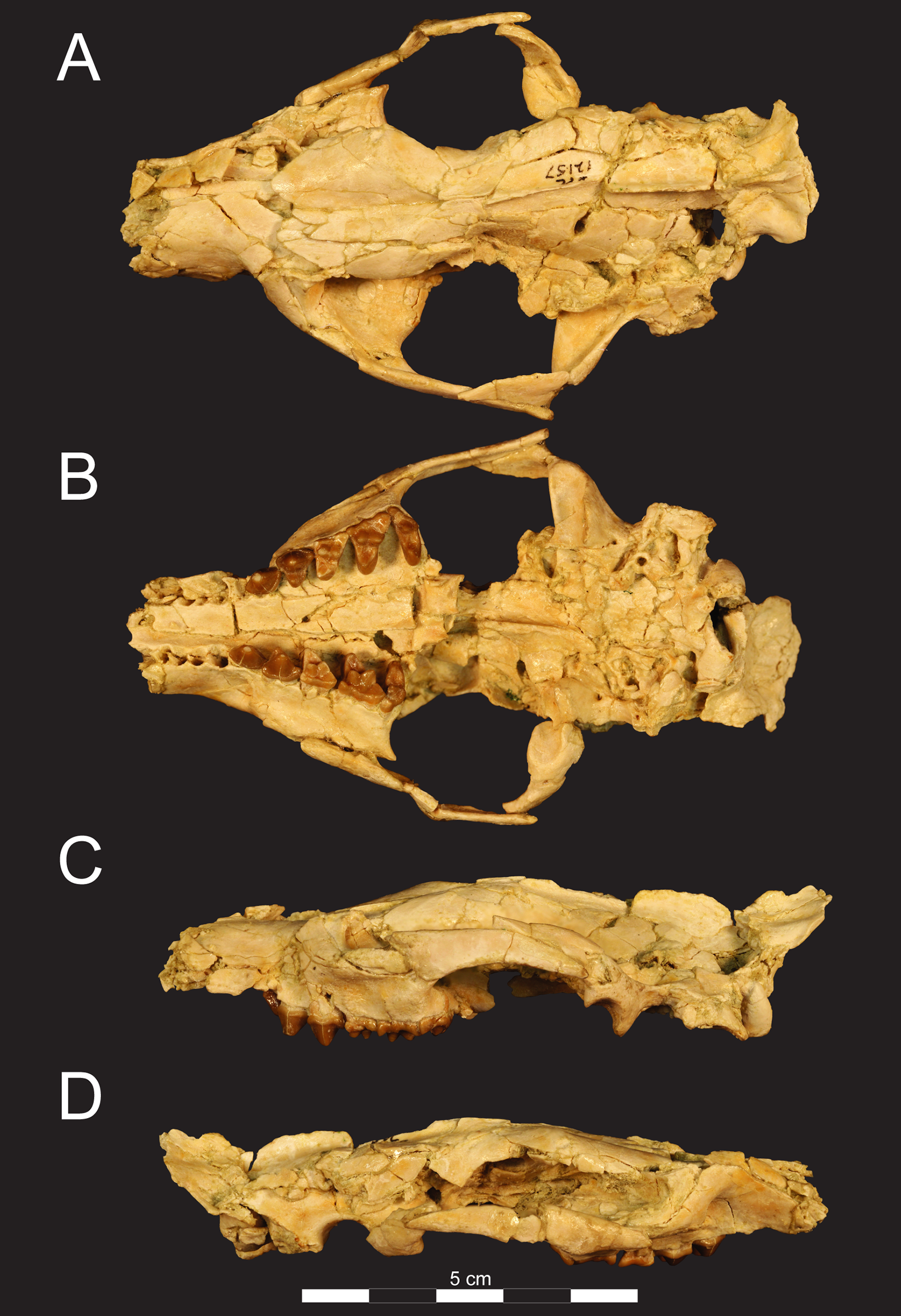
Skull of Masrasector from the Fayum

The Hyaenodonta replaced the carnivores in Africa in the Palaeogene and were the exclusive terrestrial predators there. They are sometimes placed in the broader, but not self-contained, group of Creodonta. In general, the Afro-Arabian Hyaenodonta have been little studied; earlier studies mostly compared them with forms such as Pterodon or Apterodon, which were already known from other continents. The find material of the Fayum consists largely of skulls and mandibles; postcranial body parts are few. Among others, Masrasector was described from the Fayum, which occupied the niche of the small, ground-dwelling predators, its body weight was around 1 kg (2.2 lb). In contrast, Brychotherium was six times heavier, surpassing both Akhnatenavus, which weighed about 20 kg (44 lb) or more. The latter was characterized by extremely developed crushing scissors. Another proven representative is Metapterodon. Two notched terminal phalanges of the front and hind foot indicate pangolin, a more precise determination has not yet taken place. At 2.7 and 1.1 cm (1.06 and 0.43 in) in length respectively, they are in the size range of today's species. Bats are a rather rare element among the Fayum fossils. Their record is based on just over three dozen individual finds, which mainly include dentition remains and isolated teeth. The genera Philisis, Witwatia, and possibly also Vampyravus, belong to an extinct branch of the order. In contrast to the other bats, Vampyravus is only known to have a 4.9 cm (1.9 in) long humerus. This bone, presented at the beginning of the 20th century, was the first evidence of extinct bats in the Fayum (and in Africa). Furthermore, with a body weight of around 120 g (4.2 oz), Vampyravus exceeds most other fossilized bats. Only Aegyptonycteris had a similar size, this being a large, predatory animal. Other bats can be associated with lineages that exist today. Thus, Dhofarella is close to the smooth-nosed free-tails, Qarunycteris in turn belongs to the mouse-tailed bats and Saharaderma to the big-leafed bats. The latter, as well as Khonsunycteris, a smooth-nosed bat, can be considered the smallest bats from the Fayum, with a body weight of about 30 g (1.1 oz). Also noteworthy is Phasmatonycteris, as the closest relatives of the genus today are only found in Madagascar with the Madagascan stick bats.

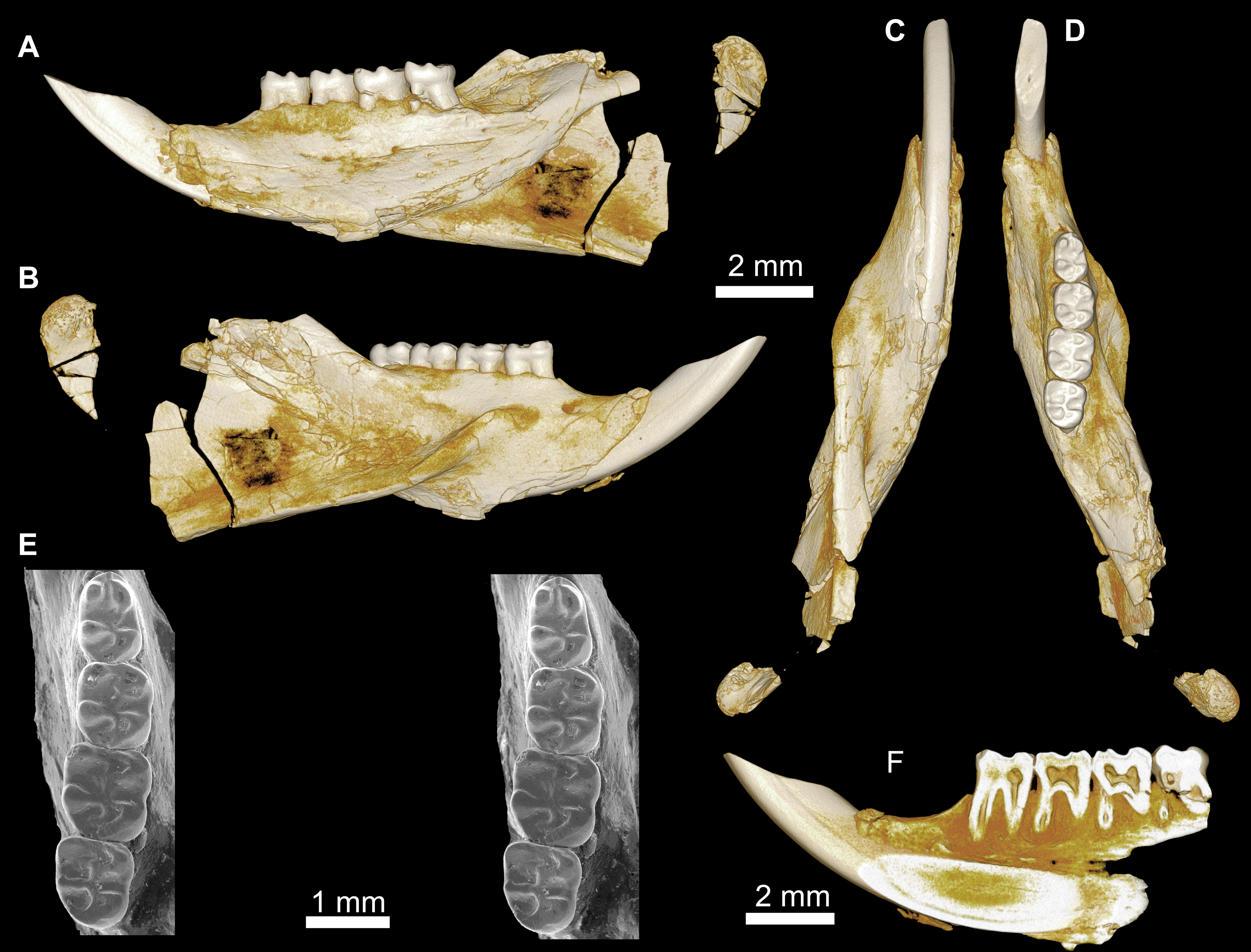
Lower jaw remains of Birkamys from the Fayum

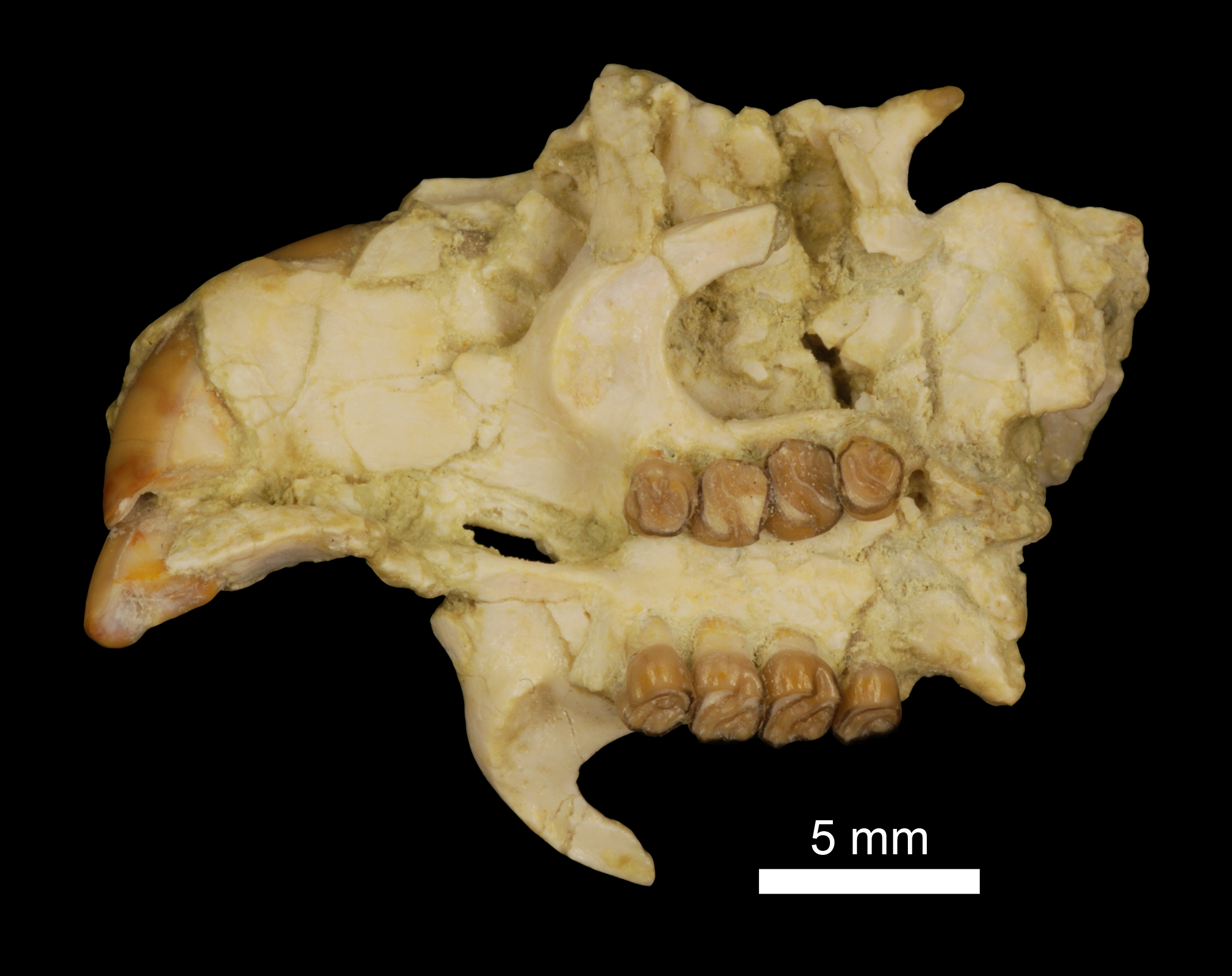
Skull of Gaudeamus from the Fayum

The superorder of the Euarchontoglires is extremely diverse and accounts for more than 50% of the finds in the Gebel-Qatrani Formation alone. The rodents make up the greater part of this. Here again, the porcupine relatives dominate, characterized by the hystricognathous lower jaw. The rodent group combines extensive skull and dentition material. Phiomys was already defined on a lower jaw at the beginning of the 20th century and has been documented many times. Closer relatives include Protophiomys, Acritophiomys and Talahphiomys, but also Qatranimys, Waslamys or Gaudeamus. As for the porcupines, all the forms mentioned are mostly extinct lineages. However, Birkamys and Mubhammys could belong in the evolutionary lineage of reed rats, as well as Monamys. Another special group can be found in the spiny-tailed squirrel relatives, which so far only occur in the lower sections of the Qasr-el-Sagha Formation. They can only show little skull and tooth material, proven genera are Shazurus and Kabirmys. The former is relatively small, but resembles the true thorn-tailed squirrel in its tooth structure. The latter represents the largest known form of the spiny-tailed squirrel relatives of the Paleogene.

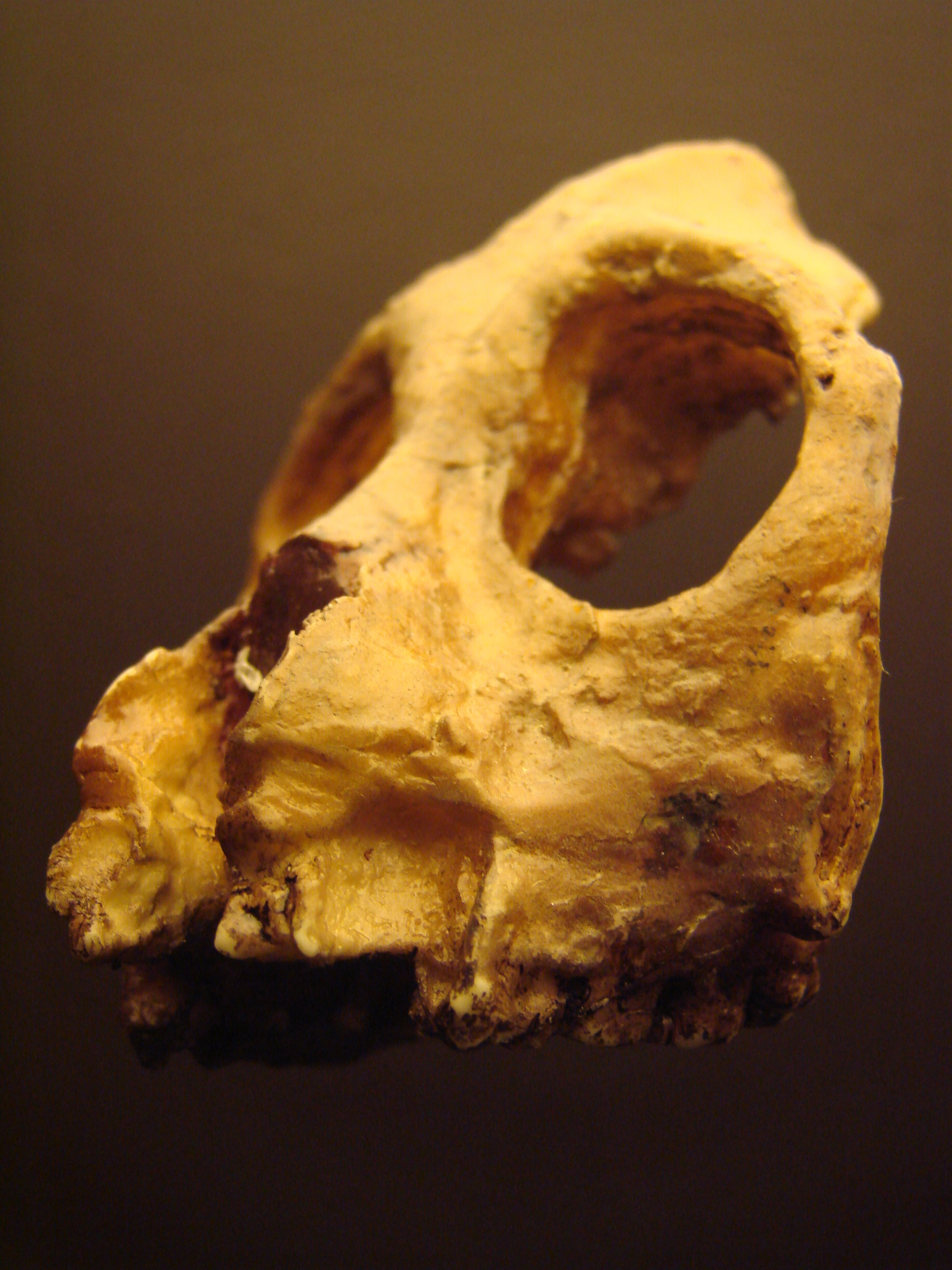
Skull of Aegyptopithecus from the Fayum

High diversity is also achieved by the primates, which, together with the Afrotheria, form one of the ancestral mammal groups of the African continent. Lori-like forms occur with Karanisia and Saharagalago, among others, also with the dwarf-like Wadilemur, of which parts of the body skeleton are known as well as the remains of its teeth. The latter two could belong to the Galagos family, while the first belongs to the Loris. Plesiopithecus, defined on the basis of a lower jaw and later supplemented by additional finds such as a partial skull, in turn joins the continental predecessor forms of the fingered animal of Madagascar. Another, rather original and extinct, lineage of primates was established with the Adapiformes. Their position within the wet-nosed primates or within the dry-nosed primates is partly disputed. Afradapis was described from the Fayum, whose grinding teeth with high cusps and long shearing edges indicate a leaf-eating diet. Masradapis, which weighed around 900 g (32 oz), may in turn have consumed a higher proportion of seeds and fruit due to its larger posterior molars and stronger lower jaw. The related Aframonius, of which not only parts of the dentition but also of the skull have survived, was about the same size. The small size of its eye socket suggests that it was a diurnal primate. Other forms represent the apes and thus the higher primates. The oldest representative is Biretia, which already occurs in the lower section of the Qasr-el-Sagha Formation. Based on the few teeth and skull remains found so far, an animal weighing just over 200 g (7.1 oz) can be reconstructed, which, unlike most modern apes, led a nocturnal lifestyle. In contrast, all other apes have so far only been found in the Gebel-Qatrani Formation. Various evolutionary lines can be differentiated. For example, the genera Apidium, Parapithecus, Proteopithecus or Qatrania belong to original lateral lineages of apes, with Apidium in particular reaching a very high frequency. According to their body skeleton, the animals obviously moved through the trees by jumping, even if some studies estimate their agility to be less great. Other forms probably belong to the stem group of Old World monkeys, such as Catopithecus and Oligopithecus as well as Propliopithecus and Aegyptopithecus. The former two are included in the Oligopithecidae family, the latter two in the Propliopithecidae. The Oligopithecidae occur mainly in stratigraphically older, the Propliopithecidae in younger sections of the Gebel-Qatrani Formation and thus largely exclude each other. However, a single lower jaw of a probably dwarfed, but not yet precisely determined oligopithecid was found in a significantly higher position (site "M") and possibly represents one of the last records of this primate group. The find occurred here in association with various representatives of the Propliopithecidae. Particularly noteworthy, however, is Aegyptopithecus, which has some good skull finds. This made it possible to work out a considerable sexual dimorphism, which is among the earliest evidence in higher primates. The brain volume of the ape form was about 20 cm^{3} (1.2 cubic inches). The diet of all Fayum monkeys studied so far was based on soft plant foods such as fruit, in accordance with the wear and tear on the teeth. The proportion of hard plant parts, which put more strain on the teeth, was generally low, but in the Propliopithecidae and the Oligopithecidae it was twice as high as in the other monkeys. The phylogenetic position of two other primates, Nosmips and Afrotarsius is unclear. There are only a few teeth and dental remains of both, which show mixed characteristics of more primitive and higher primates.

=== Trace fossils ===
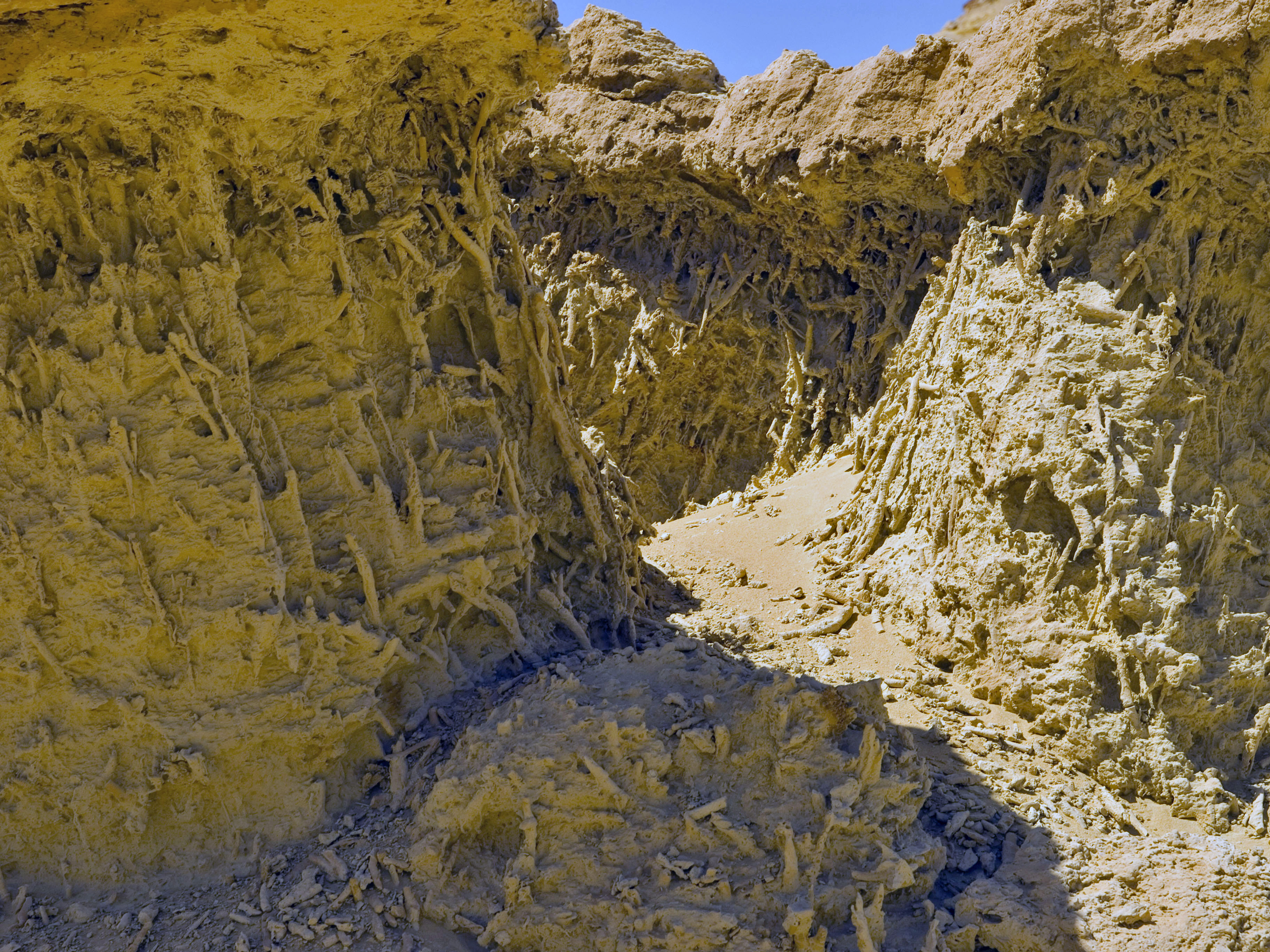
Root or burial traces in the Camp White Layer of the Birket Qarun Formation in Wadi el-Hitan

The Fayum region is characterized by excellently preserved trace fossils, which can occur in all stratigraphic units, but are more abundant in the soil formations of the continental Gebel-Qatrani Formation. More than two dozen different forms are known. These are dominated by traces of invertebrate life. These are mostly tunnels and tubes or spherical formations, which are interpreted as feeding or burrowing passages of insects, worms, molluscs or crayfish. However, there are also complex structures up to 65 cm (26 in) in diameter, which often consist of various passages, chambers and galleries. They represent fossilized nests of termites, which are assigned to the trace genus Termitichnus. Others contain galleries in several levels, which originate from Masrichnus and possibly go back to bees. There are also much larger structures, some of which are spiral or U-shaped passages up to 1.5 m (4.9 ft) long and 20 cm (7.9 in) in diameter. Their origin can probably be traced back to vertebrates, with digging mammals being a possible cause of the sometimes complex tunnel systems. A third large group of trace fossils can be referred to as rhizoliths (root passages of plants). They occur in all sizes and reflect the diverse vegetation of the time. For example, traces of the board roots of trees are documented, which probably indicate mangroves. Some of these root structures have a diameter of 3.2 m (10 ft), so that correspondingly large trees can be assumed.

=== Age position ===
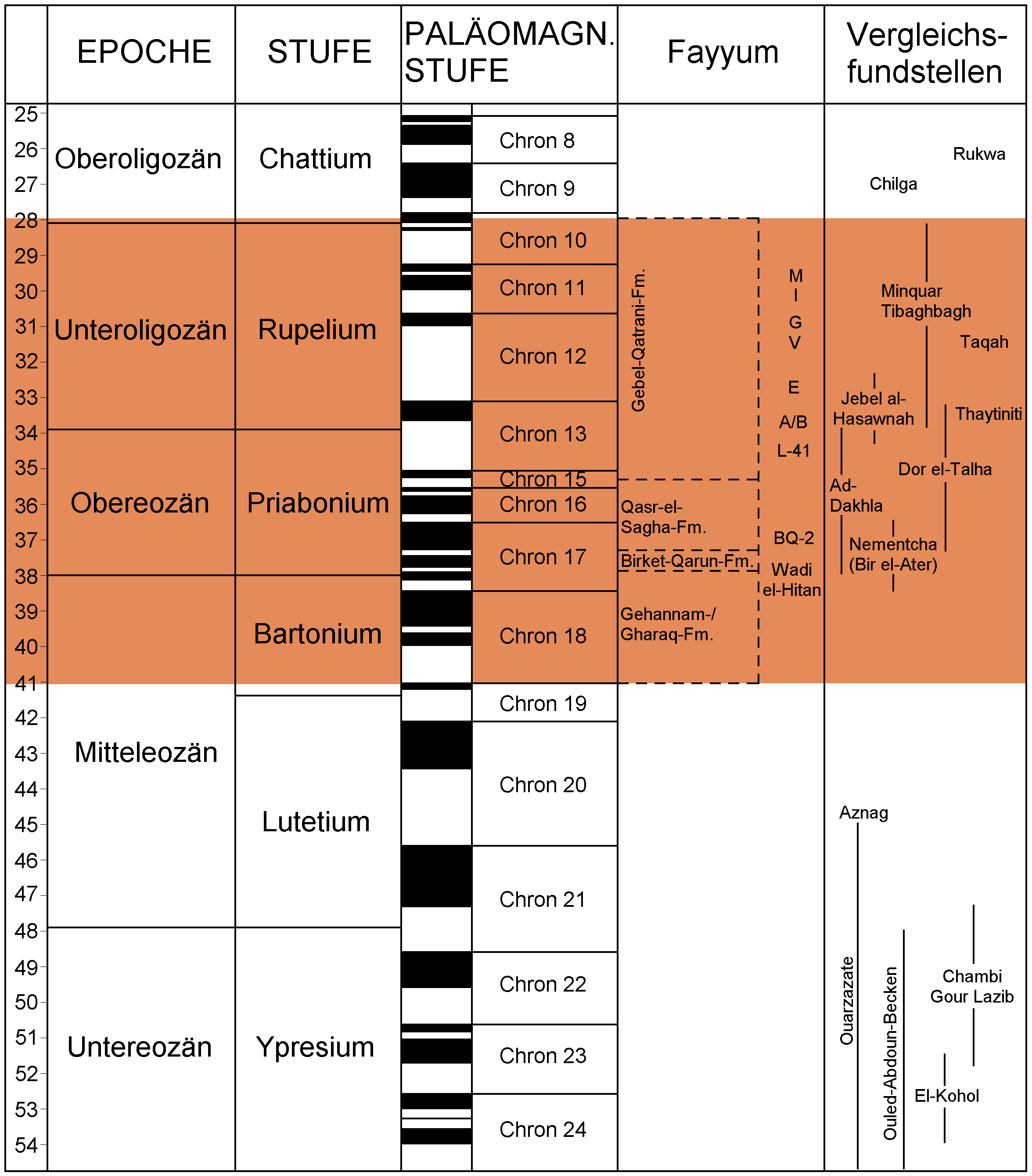
Stratigraphic position of the Fayum area within the Eocene and Oligocene

Investigations into the age of the outcrops in the Fayum and their fossils are based on three different approaches. As early as the end of the 19th century, the fossils of the Fayum were classified according to biostratigraphic considerations: for example, in the composition of the shark fauna, a classification into the Upper Eocene and the Lower Oligocene was assumed. The mollusc community also produced similar results so that, at the turn of the 19th and 20th centuries, there was little doubt about an "early Tertiary" (Palaeogene) age classification. The biostratigraphy, with its relative chronological view, was subsequently refined and a faunal succession from the lower to the upper sections was worked out. Especially for the marine deposits, invertebrates such as molluscs and foraminifera proved to be good index fossils. For the latter, an age classification into the Middle Eocene, more precisely into the Lutetian, could be made for the lower sections of the Mokattam Group. The upper depositional sequences of the group, beginning with the Gharaq Formation, belong to the Bartonian, 41 to 38 million years ago. The transition to the Priabonian and thus to the Upper Eocene, 38 to 34 million years ago, is found in the upper Gehannam Formation and is indicated by the change from Truncorotaloides to Globigerinatheka and the appearance of Turborotalia. However, there is a certain amount of variation here, so that no exact stratigraphic position can be given. An age estimate for the upper terrestrial succession was made several times with the help of mammals. However, certain difficulties arise here, as the mammals appear to be strongly endemic in large parts. They are composed of originally African forms (Afrotheria) and primarily Eurasian representatives (Laurasiatheria and Euarchontoglires). The position of the Gebel-Qatrani Formation proved to be particularly problematic, since, depending on the study, it could belong entirely to the Upper Eocene, entirely to the Lower Oligocene, or a transition between the two time periods. Nevertheless, a relative age position could be derived from individual fossil groups. Thus, the primates of the Fayum appear to be much more primitive than the phylogenetically younger forms of the Lower Miocene in eastern Africa. Due to the peculiarity of the terrestrial mammal fauna in the Fayum region, the "Phiomian" was proposed in 1991 by John A. Van Couvering and Judith A. Harris as a designation for a regional stratigraphic level.

The new dating methods developed in the course of the 20th century allowed, among other things, absolute dating approaches. The first data for the Widan-el-Faras basalt overlying the Eocene and Oligocene sedimentary sequence were published as early as the 1960s, based on the potassium-argon dating. At the time, they yielded an age of 24.7 to 27 million years, which corresponds to the Upper Oligocene. The values could therefore be regarded as the minimum age for the underlying sediment layers. Further radiometric analyses from the 1980s assigned a slightly higher age of 31 million years to the lowest section of the Widan-el-Faras Basalt. However, the result subsequently proved to be inaccurate. Measurements carried out in the 1990s in the same areas, combined with a review of the previously obtained age estimates, confirmed the Upper Oligocene position for the basalt; the new values amounted to around 23.6 million years.

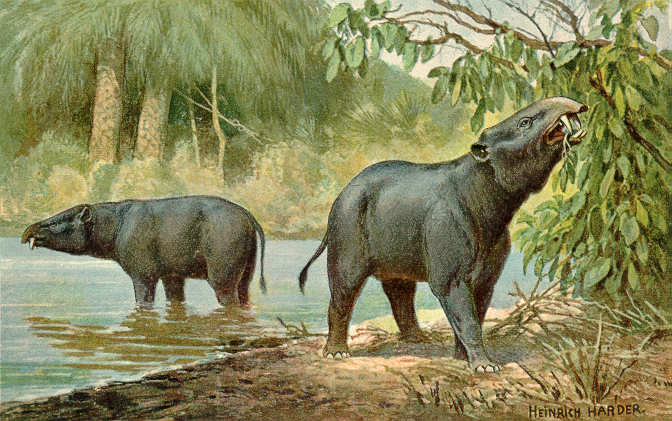
Landscape reconstruction with the early proboscidean Moeritherium

Direct dating of the marine and fluviatile-lacustrine fossil-bearing sedimentary rocks of the Fayum is not yet possible. However, the radiometric investigations of the 1990s were linked to measurements of palaeomagnetism. The sequences analyzed concerned the upper section of the Qasr-el-Sagha Formation (Dir Abu Lifa Member) and the entire Gebel-Qatrani Formation. Within the depositional sequence, a multiple change in the polarity of the Earth's magnetic field could be detected, which the authors linked to the magnetostratigraphic Chron 16to Chron 12 sections. The sections corresponded to an age classification (at the time) of around 37 to 33 million years. As a result of the work, it could, therefore, be assumed that the Fayum series of deposits belonged almost entirely to the Eocene, with only the uppermost section of the Gebel-Qatrani Formation falling within the transition to the Lower Oligocene. Later analyses recorded a far more extensive sediment sequence, starting in the basal areas of the Qasr-el-Sagha Formation, and also carried out a comparison with other sites in the immediate and wider surroundings. They corrected and specified the results of the first measurements. From the point of view of magnetostratigraphy, the depositional sequence ranges from Chron 17 (Qasr-el-Sagha Formation) to Chron 10 (Gebel-Qatrani Formation), the corresponding age data being 38 to 28.5 million years. The transition from the Eocene to the Oligocene is found in Chron 13, which occupies the lower part of the Gebel-Qatrani Formation. Accordingly, by far the largest part of the rock unit is of Oligocene origin, with only the lowest 48 m (157 ft) already being formed in the Upper Eocene. The important site, L-41, is located precisely in this transitional area and dates to around 34 million years old. The stratigraphically younger sites "I" and "M" are embedded in the Chron 11 and are therefore around 29.5 million years old. Site BQ-2, which contains some of the earliest terrestrial fossil finds and is located in the lower section of the Qasr-el-Sagha Formation, is classified as significantly older. It belongs to Chron 17, with an absolute age value of around 37 million years.

=== Landscape reconstruction ===
Today, the Fayum region is located in the middle of the Sahara and is characterized by a desert climate with an average annual temperature of around 22 °C (72 °F), absolute maximum values around 49 °C (120 °F) and minimum values around −1 °C (30 °F). The annual precipitation is only 10 mm and is largely limited to the winter half-year, while the evaporation rate can be more than 200 times higher.

In the Palaeogene, Africa was a continental island joined with the Arabian Peninsula. This Afro-Arabian landmass was separated from the Eurasian continent by the Tethys Ocean, and a land bridge only formed in the transition to the Miocene around 24 million years ago, with the gradual closure of the Tethys. The formations of the Mokattam Group, consisting largely of limestones, are of marine and shallow marine origin and were therefore deposited within the Tethys in the Middle Eocene. The same applies to parts of the Maadi Group, but here the influence of the coastal proximity at the southern edge of the Tethys is already noticeable. The Birket-Qarun Formation and the lower sections of the Qasr-el-Sagha Formation (Umm Rigl Member to Temple Member) indicate the further retreat of the seawater to the north, whereby a bay, later lagoon-like landscape was formed in the course of the Upper Eocene. The coarser clastic deposits of the Dir Abu Lifa Member on the shallow marine sediments, on the other hand, were formed under the conditions of a river delta or an estuary, which illustrates increasingly terrestrial conditions.

The Gebel-Qatrani Formation caps the underlying strata. It goes back to a coastal swamp or floodplain that existed in the transition from the Eocene to the Oligocene, in the form of a mangrove or terra firme landscape. The area was crossed by several rivers that were relatively wide and powerful enough to move larger rock components. Forests grew along the riverbanks, which also extended into the hinterland. The relative proximity to the sea had a certain influence, so that brackish water conditions prevailed in some areas. This landscape supported a rich and diverse fauna, consisting of terrestrial and aquatic animals, the latter comprising freshwater, saltwater and brackish water fauna. According to further palaeontological and geological data, a tropical to subtropical climate prevailed during the formation of the Gebel-Qatrani Formation in the Lower Oligocene. The formation of the paleosols shows an alternation of wet and dry periods, possibly due to the influence of a monsoon.

=== Comparison with regionally and nationally significant sites ===
The Fayum region is one of the most important late Palaeogene fossil deposits in Africa and the rest of the world. It is also one of the few sites on the African continent that cover the period from the Upper Eocene to the Lower Oligocene. In contrast, older sites in northern Africa are comparatively more common. One of the earliest terrestrial fossil communities of the Cenozoic was discovered in the Ouled-Abdoun Basin in Morocco and dates to the Paleocene and Lower Eocene. Older, find-bearing layers here date back to the Maastrichtian, so that a discovery period from 72 million years ago to around 48 million years ago is recorded. The basin is known, among other things, for its phosphate richness. The upper part of the sequence contains very primitive forms of mammals, such as Ocepeia and Abdounodus, two forms close to today's Afrotheria. With Eritherium and Phosphatherium, two of the earliest known proboscideans also appear, and Stylolophus, an original member of the Embrithopoda, was also discovered. El-Kohol, in northern Algeria, can be considered comparable to the uppermost section of the Ouled-Abdoun Basin. Among other things, marsupials, hyaenodonts, sloths and proboscideans were found here. The mammal fauna is much closer to that of Fayum, but still appears to be comparatively archaic, with the Seggeurius and the Numidotherium. The Lower to Middle Eocene site complex Gour Lazib, western Algeria, plays a stronger mediating role, as forms already occur here with Megalohyrax and Titanohyrax, which are also known from Fayum. Special features are the very early primate Azibius and Helioseus, a mammal of unknown relationship. The material is mostly very small in size, which limits the information available. Chambi, in Tunisia, also shows links to Fayum and, in addition to sleepers and primates, some of the oldest proboscideans have also been documented here. The collection of finds from the Ouarzazate Basin in Morocco, consisting largely of teeth only, is also significant. The numerous sites in the basin range in time from the late Palaeocene to the Middle Eocene. Older localities, such as Adrar Mgorn and N'Tagourt, yielded primitive insectivorous mammals such as Afrodon or Todralestes, which possibly correspond to an African-endemic fauna. In addition, there is Altiatlasius, a primate that is probably on the threshold of ape evolution, and Tinerhodon, a representative of the Hyaenodonta. The collection at the most recent site, Aznag, is made up of shrew-like insectivores, bats, proboscideans and primitive ungulates. To date, Aznag is the only site with land mammals from northern Africa that is clearly from the Middle Eocene.

From the Upper Eocene, the site Nementcha (also Bir el-Ater) in northern Algeria can be named, which is thus contemporaneous with the Qasr el-Sagha Formation. This is indicated by Moeritherium and Bunohyrax, and the first anthracotheres have also been identified as Eurasian immigrants in Africa. Other small mammals include rodents of the Phiomyidae family and proboscideans. The finds from Ad-Dakhla in the Western Sahara are of a comparable age. The fossils found in the Guerrani Member of the Samlat Formation consist of numerous fish remains as well as turtles, crocodiles, isolated birds and marine and terrestrial mammals. Among the marine mammals, remains of the whales Saghacetus, Basilosaurus and Dorudon and the manatee Eosiren stand out. As a land-dwelling mammal, the tooth of a proboscidean was discovered, which possibly corresponds to Numidotherium.

The Dor el-Talha and Jebel al-Hasawnah sites, both in Libya, on the other hand, form a temporal equivalent to the Gebel Qatrani Formation in the Fayum. All three sites have a comparable faunal community composition. The large mammals of Dor el-Talha include Barytherium, Moeritherium and Palaeomastodon, as well as Arsinoitherium, while gavial-like forms stand out among the reptiles. Also noteworthy are early primates, such as Karanisia, and early apes, such as Biretia or Talahpithecus, as well as early proboscideans, such as Eotmantsoius. Among others, Saghatherium and Titanohyrax were found in Jebel al-Hasawnah. The site is also outstanding for taphonomic reasons, as it is the only fossil site in Palaeogene Africa to have yielded skeletons of land mammals in an anatomical context. The Zallah site complex in the Sirte Basin of central Libya has a similar chronological context. Fossils have been recovered here since the 1960s, but they are largely limited to teeth. The rodent fauna is very numerous, with remains of various porcupine relatives such as Gaudeamus, Metaphiomys or Neophiomys, as well as spiny-tailed squirrel relatives such as Kabirmys. In addition, with Thyrohyrax, there are also lopsided and with Bothriogenys representatives of the Anthracotheriidae have also been recorded. Africtis in turn represents the earliest known African form from the family of carnivores, which has its origin in Eurasia. The fossil deposit of Minqar Tibaghbagh in the southwest of the Qattara Depression, which was only discovered in 2007, also corresponds to the Gebel-Qatrani Formation with its banded sandstones. The Oligocene deposits not only contain the remains of sharks, turtles and crocodiles, but also of land-living mammals; Phiomia, Antilohyrax and Bothriogenys have been described so far. An older find horizon from the Upper Eocene also contained fossils of whales and manatees. From the Arabian Peninsula, the Thaytiniti and Taqah sites in Oman can also be mentioned, which contain a fauna roughly contemporary with the upper sections of Fayum.

Comparatively few sites from the Upper Oligocene have been found in Africa. One of the most important is Chilga in Ethiopia, which is around 27 million years old. The large mammals include proboscideans as well as sloths and embrithopods. They show a mixture of older forms such as those found in the Fayum, such as Arsinoitherium, Megalohyrax or Palaeomastodon, but also more modern elements. For example, the proboscideans include Chilgatherium and Gomphotherium, both of which belong to phylogenetically younger lineages such as the Deinotheria and the Gomphotheria. Along the Great African Rift Valley, there are several Upper Oligocene fossil-bearing areas that extend from northwestern Kenya to southwestern Tanzania. Only the Eragaleit Beds, west of Lake Turkana, should be mentioned here as an example. Here, too, a faunal mixture of older and younger elements occurs. In addition to some forms already known since the Fayum (Arsinoitherium, Thyrohyrax), there is Losodocodon, a basal member of the mammutid lineage, and Kamoyapithecus, a close relative of Proconsul and thus of the Miocene anthropoids, and Mioprionodon, a clear member of the predators that migrated from Eurasia.

== Research history ==
=== The beginnings up to the 19th century ===
It can be assumed that the Fayum Depression was already known as a fossil-bearing site in Ancient Egyptian times. Quarries are documented from the upper areas of the Qasr-el-Sagha Formation, where the abundant gypsum was mined and processed into vessels as early as the Old Kingdom. The quarries are located in the immediate vicinity of fossilized tree trunk layers. The Widan-el-Faras basalt was used at the same time as a raw material store for lining mortuary temples. The region was also regarded by the people of the time as the origin of life, and the goddess Isis is said to have buried the bones of her deceased husband Osiris here.

The first fossil finds of modern times go back to Arthur Bedford Orlebar (1810–1866), who in 1845 found some sintered tree stumps up to 20 m long in sandstone layers. Further finds are due to the German geologist Georg Schweinfurth (1836–1925), who was an experienced African explorer. In 1879, he discovered numerous molluscs on the island of Geziret el-Qorn in Lake Qarun as well as teeth and bones of sharks and bones of whales. Today, the finds are generally assigned to the Birket-Qarun Formation. The vertebrate remains were processed in 1883 by Wilhelm B. Dames, who among other things recognized two species of Zeuglodon (today mostly Basilosaurus). In the same year, the Swiss geologist Karl Mayer-Eymar took up the molluscs. Schweinfurth returned to Fayum in the mid-1880s and investigated the areas north of Lake Qarun. He not only discovered the temple ruins of Qasr el-Sagha (also known as "Schweinfurth's Temple"), but also other vertebrate remains. These were also scientifically analyzed by Dames, among other things he described the new whale species Zeuglodon osiris ('Saghacetus). Schweinfurth published his own report on his journey, which appeared in 1886. In the 1890s, Mayer-Eymar also spent several short periods in the Fayum.

=== From the 19th to the 20th century - a great period of research ===
The transition from the 19th to the 20th century coincided with an intensive research phase in the Fayum, during which a wide variety of groups were active. The British palaeontologist Hugh John Llewellyn Beadnell (1874–1944). He mapped the northern and eastern boundaries of the basin from 1898 on behalf of the Geological Survey of Egypt. The aim was to create an irrigation system for the agricultural use of the basin. During his work, Beadnell discovered numerous fossils of fish and crocodiles, as well as whales and manatees. He sent these to the Natural History Museum in London, where they aroused the interest of Charles William Andrews (1866–1924). Andrews joined Beadnell's investigations on site from 1901. Together they explored the northern part of the Fayum Basin, which lasted until 1904. Their investigations concerned both the stratigraphically older and deeper outcrops (Birket-Qarun and Qasr-el-Sagha formations) and the younger and higher outcrops (Gebel-Qatrani formation, mainly the lower zone) north of Lake Qarun. Their most important discoveries from the former include the giant snake Gigantophis, as well as Barytherium and Moeritherium, two proboscideans, and the manatee Eosiren. In the latter, Arsinoitherium and Phiomia appeared in turn, as well as original sloths, such as Saghatherium. In 1902, Beadnell also discovered the Wadi el-Hitan. Both Andrews and Beadnell published the first results of their work in short articles, usually combined with the first scientific descriptions of new species and genera. These often appeared in the Geological magazine, but also in other ways. Beadnell also gave a brief overview of his geological work, which was followed by a detailed monograph in 1905. Here he named the Wadi el-Hitan Zeuglodon valley for the first time. A year later, Andrews published a comprehensive catalog of the vertebrate finds under the title A descriptive catalogue of the Tertiary Vertebrata of the Fayum, Egypt, which is still one of the standard works on the Fayum fossils today. He made his last trip to the Fayum Basin in the spring of the same year.

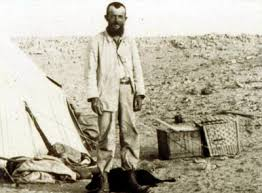
Richard Markgraf in the Fayum region, photographed during the expedition of the American Museum of Natural History in 1907

Research activities by German scientists also took place during the same period. As early as 1900, Max Blanckenhorn (1861–1947) presented his geological surveys after a short stay in the Fayum. Two years later, he visited the fossil sites of the basin together with Ernst Stromer (1871–1952) visited the fossil sites of the basin. The material they collected was published relatively early on. They were followed by the Austrian fossil collector Richard Markgraf (1869–1916), who had left his homeland for Egypt for health reasons. In 1897, Markgraf met the German researcher Eberhard Fraas (1862–1915). Fraas himself planned further visits to eastern and southern Africa, but was unable to realize this for the time being. Instead, he returned to Stuttgart and taught Markgraf how to search for fossils by telex. In return, Markgraf sent him his fossils, which he first collected at Gebel Mokattam east of Cairo. In 1903, Markgraf met Stromer and joined his three-month expedition to the Fayum Basin. Both explored the northern parts of the depression, which were also the focus of British scientists. Markgraf then worked for Fraas again. He in turn organized a trip to Egypt in 1906 to join forces with Markgraf. After a series of difficulties, the expedition finally took place for 10 days from March 11. The Qasr-el-Sagha formation and the Gebel-Qatrani formation were the focus of their attention. Among other things, they discovered finds of Arsinoitherium and Basilosaurus, as well as crocodiles. A comprehensive publication on the activities of German researchers in the Fayum Basin was published by Max Schlosser (palaeontologist) in 1911. In it, he also described Propliopithecus and Parapithecus, the first clear primates from the area. Stromer returned briefly to the Fayum on his third Egyptian expedition in 1914, but the main focus of the trip was on the Bahariyya oasis. Over the next two decades, numerous articles on Stromer's research were published in the Abhandlungen der Bayerischen Akademie der Wissenschaften. Markgraf remained in Egypt until his death in 1916 and collected regularly in the Fayum Basin, offering his finds to various scientific institutes.

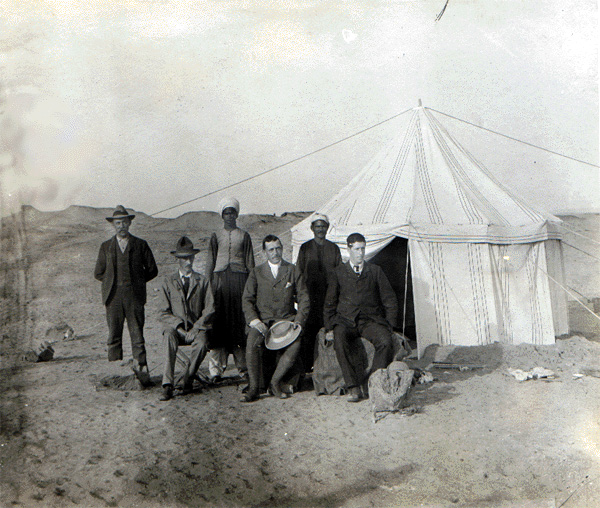
Participants of the expedition of the American Museum of Natural History to the Fayum region in 1907

Parallel to Markgraf's activities on site and after the appearance of the publications by Beadnell and Andrews, the American Museum of Natural History organized an expedition to the Fayum Basin under the leadership of Henry Fairfield Osborn (1857–1935) organized an expedition to the Fayum Basin. This was the museum's first foreign expedition, which was to be followed by several more very successful ones, including to Mongolia. The expedition was supported by the then US President Theodore Roosevelt. The Americans arrived there at the beginning of February 1907 and stayed until the end of May of the same year. Osborn's assistants were Walter W. Granger (1872–1942) and George Olsen. Osborn himself only stayed in Egypt for the beginning of the expedition, but he made a short detour to the Wadi el-Hitan, which he named Zeuglodon valley according to Beadnell. The remaining members of the expedition worked in various outcrops and met Markgraf several times during their time there. He was also hired by the Americans to search for fossils, but worked independently. Much of the research concerned the Gebel-Qatrani Formation and continued the work in the sites in the lower zone already discovered by Andrews and Beadnell. However, the researchers also discovered finds in the upper zone for the first time. The fossils found include the remains of Arsinoitherium, several proboscidean forms, hyaenodonts, rodents and early sloths. The entire find material, around 550 individual objects, was shipped to America. Following the expedition, Osborn published several articles about the fossil finds, as well as about the expedition itself. The full report, which includes Granger's diary, was not published until 2002.

Independently of the previous investigations, the National Museum of Natural History of Paris, under the organizational leadership of Marcellin Boule and Jean Albert Gaudry, carried out a two-week expedition to the Fayum in March/April 1904, which was financially supported by Edmond de Rothschild. Among those involved was René Fourtau, a French engineer who had been living in Egypt since 1888 and was interested in geology. Among other things, Fourtau analyzed fossil invertebrates, mainly sea urchins, for the Egyptian Geological Survey. The work took place in the Gebel-Qatrani formation. As a result, the French brought around 80 vertebrate fossils to Paris, including the remains of Titanohyrax, a giant slipper lizard. In contrast to the other expeditions, those of the Muséum national d'histoire naturelle were hardly processed, so that the expedition of 1904 was almost forgotten.

=== Interlude ===
In the following almost five decades after the predominantly British, German and American research on site, hardly any activities took place in the Fayum. One exception was a pan-African expedition by the University of California in 1947 under Wendell Phillips. Several scientists excavated in previously opened outcrops. Due to the limited time, the find material is not very extensive, but consists of proboscideans, hyaenodonts, anthracotheres and embrithopods. It is now housed at Berkeley. Three years later, a skull of a prehistoric whale was also discovered.

=== Modern research ===
In the 1950s, Elwyn L. Simons (1930–2016) described the skull bone of a primate from the Fayum, which was stored in the holdings of the American Museum of Natural History. He then launched an initiative for further field research in the Fayum, which was intended, among other things, to investigate the origin of the closest human relatives. In cooperation with Yale University and later Duke University with the Geological Survey of Egypt and the Geological Museum of Cairo, the fieldwork began in 1961 and ended in 1967. In addition to early primates, the focus was mainly on small vertebrates, which had previously received less attention. The annual field research led, among other things, to the description of Oligopithecus and Aegyptopithecus, two primate forms, and Phiocricetomys, a rodent. In addition, there were also investigations into stratigraphy and the age position. One declared aim, for example, was to document the exact position of the older outcrops. Simons published an overview of the geological-palaeontological work in 1968.

In 1977, a second phase of investigations began in the Fayum, again under the overall direction of Simons. It lasted until 2005, a period of 28 years. The second phase was characterized by an increasingly interdisciplinary approach. Numerous internationally renowned scientists were involved, each with their own research focus. These included Philip D. Gingerich (marine mammals), David Tab Rasmussen (birds, shrimps) and Erik R. Seiffert (primates). In addition, other fields of work were increasingly in focus, such as the paleoenvironment, paleomagnetics or soil science. New fossil groups such as trace fossils were also included. Another focus concerned the training of young scientists. Advances in excavation methods made it possible to significantly increase the yield of finds. At the end of the 1970s alone, more than 1400 mammal remains were recovered. The work on site then continued, and the processing of the finds continues to this day, with new species and genera from the Fayum Basin being described almost every year.

== Bibliography ==
- Charles W. Andrews: A descriptive catalogue of the Tertiary Vertebrata of the Fayum, Egypt. London 1906, P. 1–324
- Vincent L. Morgan und Spencer G. Lucas: Notes From Diary–Fayum Trip, 1907 (based on the expedition diary and photographs of Walter Granger). Bulletin of the New Mexico Museum of Natural History and Science 22, 2002, P. 1–148
- Elwyn L. Simons: Eocene and Oligocene mammals of the Fayum, Egypt. In: First International Conference on the Geology of the Tethys, Cairo University, November, 2005, Volume II. Cairo 2005, P. 439–450
