= Jebel Qatrani Formation =

Geologic formation in Egypt

- Stratigraphic range: Eocene-Oligocene; ~Priabonian–Rupelian
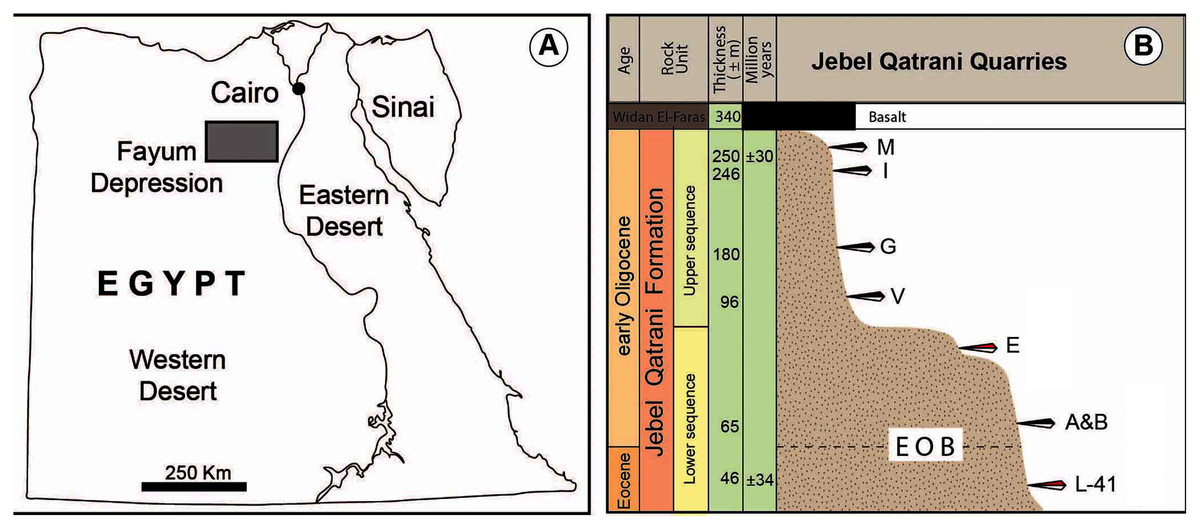
- Type: Formation
- Sub-units: Lower Sequence (Lower Fossil Wood Zone) Barite Sandstone Upper Sequence (Upper Fossil Wood Zone)
- Underlies: Widan el Faras Basalt
- Overlies: Qasr el Sagha Formation
- Area: Fayum Depression
- Thickness: 340 m

Lithology
- Primary: sandstone, mudstone

Location
- Region: Faiyum Governorate
- Country: Egypt

The Jebel Qatrani Formation (also Gebel Qatrani, Gabal Qatrani or Djebel Qatrani) is a geologic formation located in the Faiyum Governorate of central Egypt. It is exposed between the Jebel Qatrani escarpment and the Qasr el Sagha escarpment, north of Birket Qarun lake near Faiyum. The formation conformably overlies the Qasr el Sagha Formation and is topped by the Widan el Faras Basalt. The age of the formation has been subject to debate, but the most recent research indicates that it covers both the latest parts of the Eocene and the Early Oligocene, spanning over the boundary between these two time periods.

The geology and fauna of this formation gives a good idea of the environment and animals present during this time period. Research suggests that the Jebel Qatrani Formation featured a mix of subtropical to tropical forest, lowland swamps and marshes, ponds and rivers that would empty northward into the Tethys Sea. This is supported by the presence of water-dependent fauna including podocnemidid turtles, crocodilians, sea cows, various fish, jacanas, early flamingo-relatives, ospreys, herons and shoebills.

Besides these, the fossil record of the Jebel Qatrani Formation is especially well known for its value to understanding the early evolution of many modern mammal groups. Primates are represented by over a dozen genera, several forms of early elephants have been recovered from the sediments including the terrestrial Phiomia and the semi-aquatic Moeritherium. The fossil rodents of the formation meanwhile are thought to be an important link between the African phiomorphs (dassies, old world porcupines, mole rats and cane rats) and the caviomorphs of South America (capybaras, chinchillas and new world porcupines). Besides these early members of groups that would later rise to prominence, the formation was also home to a variety of unique groups no longer found today or only found in a greatly diminished diversity. This includes the enigmatic, possibly carnivorous ptolemaiids, large hyaenodonts, a vast number of highly diverse hyracoids including species the size of rhinos, anthracotheres and the bizarre embrithopod Arsinoitherium.

== Geography and history ==
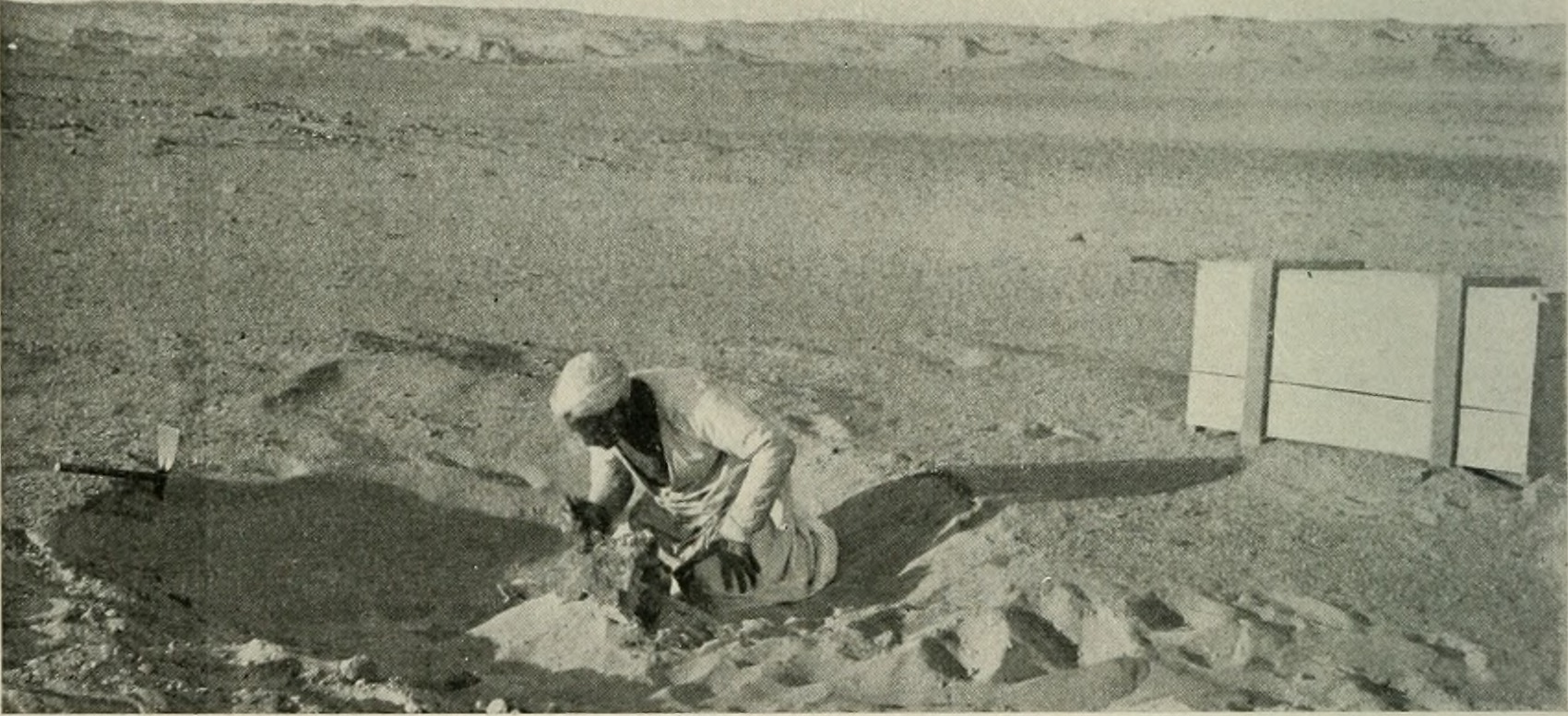
Excavation of an Arsinoitherium skull in Fayum (1908).

Outcrops of the Jebel Qatrani Formation are present in the northern Fayum Depression southwest of Cairo. The Fayum Depression is an oasis west of the Nile in northern Egypt.

The formations of the Fayum have been studied for a significant amount of time by numerous paleontologists, with research dating back to as early as the 19th century. During this time the region was studied extensively by scientists including but not limited to Charles William Andrews, Henry Fairfield Osborn, René Fourtau and Ernst Stromer. Among the first names for what is now known as the Jebel Qatrani formation was the "Fluvio-Marine Series", as coined by Hugh J. L. Beadnell. However, despite the bulk of research conducted in the late 19th and early 20th century, the Fayum localities would eventually enter a period of obscurity following the outbreak of World War I which continued throughout the mid 20th century and World War II. Research resumed during the 1960s, following an expedition under Elwyn LaVerne Simons. Previously, the formations of the region had been primarily known for the preservation of mammals, but Birds were also known from few specimens uncovered in the early 20th century. During the 60s, improved collection methods and additional expeditions by the Yale and Duke University gathered much additional material in association with the Egyptian Geological Survey and the General Petroleum Company. Around the 70s, the scope of the expedition was broadened to account for more diverse fields of study, leading to more precise datings of the strata.

== Geology and stratigraphy ==
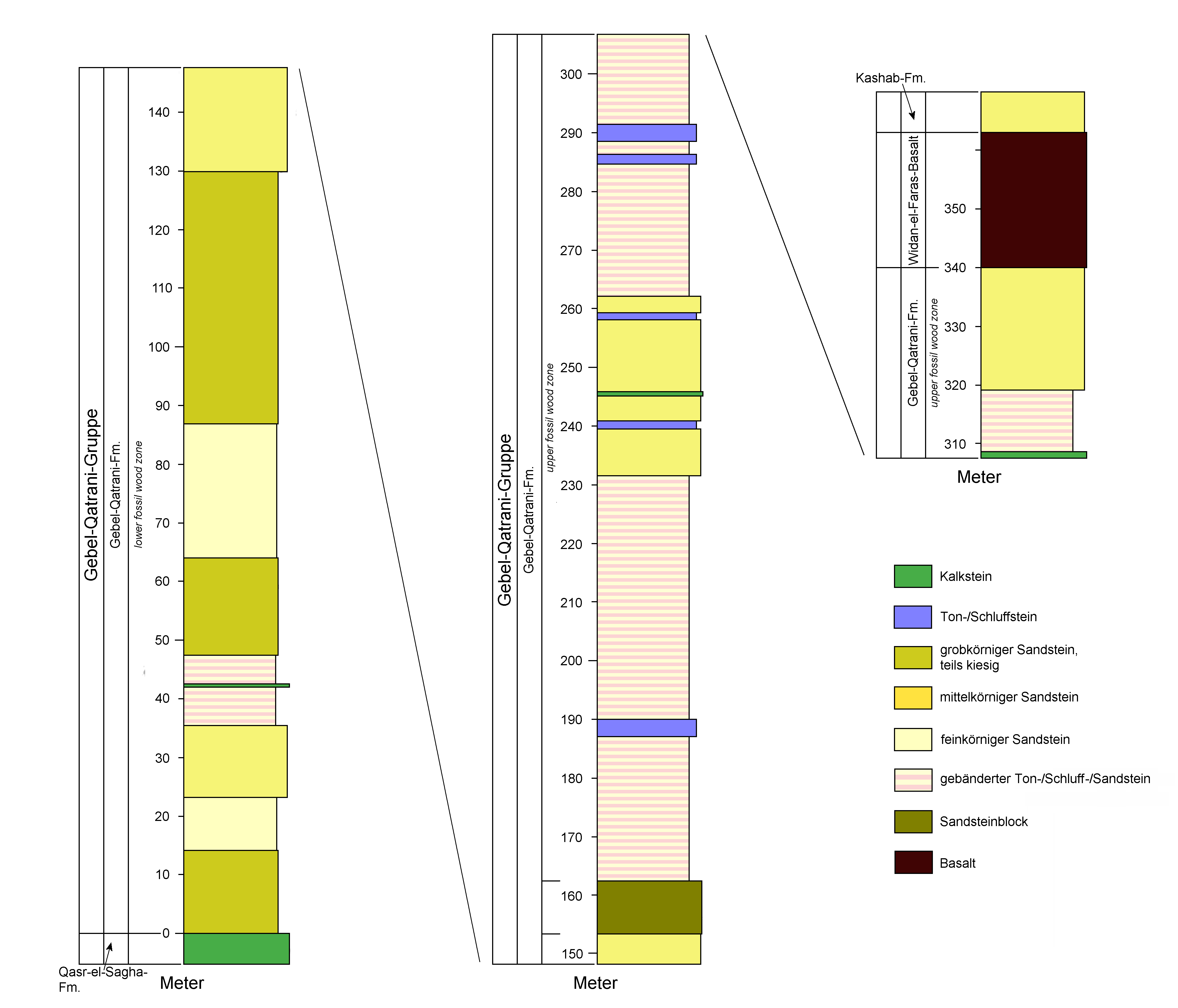
Geological section Gebel Qatrani formation

The formation overlies the Eocene Qasr el Sagha Formation and is overlaid by the Oligocene Widan el Faras Basalt. The formation contains at least two major fossil bearing layers, one in the upper sequence, which is used to refer to the top layers of the formation, and a second in the lower sequence. These two layers have also been called the Upper and Lower Fossil Wood Zones in older publications. Both sequences of the Jebel Qatrani Formation are separated from one another by the so-called Barite Sandstone, a layer with a thickness of 4–10 m (13–33 ft).

The dating of the Jebel Qatrani Formation has historically been under debate, with some research having placed it either entirely within the Eocene or Oligocene and some arguing that it spans both periods. Rasmussen and colleagues for instance argued that the central Barite Sandstones separating both fossil bearing layers mark the exact Eocene-Oligocene Boundary. Part of the reasoning for this connects to the primate fauna of the formation, with propliopithecids and parapithecines only appearing in the upper localities. Other dating methods meanwhile have generally not been applicable. According to Seiffert, the mammal fauna of the formation on its own is too endemic and marine invertebrates are absent, preventing biostratigraphic dating. Radioisotopic dating was conducted on the overlying Widan el Faras Basalt, however the results of this suggested an age of 23.6 million years for its lower units, much younger than prior estimates for the Jebel Qatrani Formation. However, in a 2006 publication Seiffert draws a comparison between the Fayum fauna and the fossil record of the Ashawq Formation in Oman, which notably preserved vertebrates as well as foraminifera useful in dating. Foraminifera biostratigraphy and magnetostratigraphy suggest that the examined localities in Oman date to approximately 31-31.5 (Taqah locality) and 33.7-33.3 Ma (Thaytiniti locality). Seiffert argues that the mammal fauna from Oman most closely resembles those found in the oldest localities of the Lower Sequence of the Jebel Qatrani Formation (L-41) and the oldest localities of the Upper Sequence (quarries G and V). The hyraxes Thyrohyrax and Saghatherium occur in both formations, as does the primate Moeripithecus. More generally, both formations preserve propliopithecids and parapithecine parapithecids as well as oligopithecids. While the former two groups are restricted to the younger Fayum sequence, the latter is the most common primate family in the older sediments. Assuming the traditional interpretation of the Jebel Qatrani Formation, this would mean that many of these taxa would have had to appear 2 to 4 million years earlier in Egypt than in Oman, which is considered to be unlikely by Seiffert. According to them the formation spans approximately 8 million years, with its oldest localities situated in latest Eocene strata. Locality BQ-2 has been estimated to be 37 million years old (early Priabonian), while L-41 falls into an age range of 34.8–33.7 million years old, a timespan that includes the Eocene-Oligocene Boundary. Although an earliest Oligocene age could not be disproven by Seiffert, he argues that a latest Eocene age should be considered more likely based on an unconformity present just above the locality (one also acknowledged as a possible candidate for the EOB by Rasmussen). This means that only the lower 48 m (157 ft) of the formation are Eocene in age, including both the BQ-2 and L-41 localities. The remainder of the Lower Sequence, as well as the entire Upper Sequence, would subsequently fall within the Oligocene. The position of quarries A and B in regards to the boundary is ambiguous, however Quarry E on the other hand is considered without doubt Oligocene (ca. 33 Ma) in age by Seiffert.

== Paleoenvironment ==
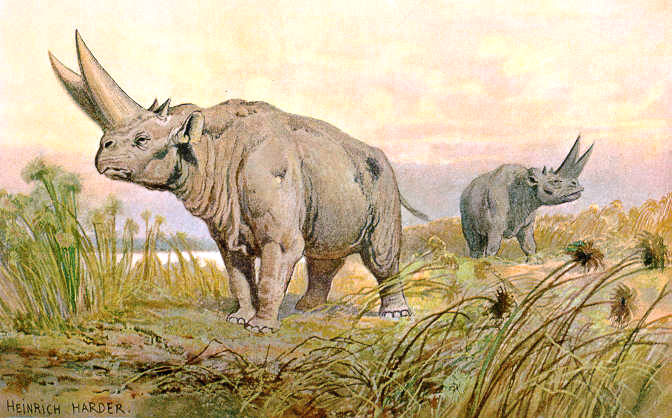
Arsinoitherium illustrated by Heinrich Harder.

The environment of the Jebel Qatrani formation has been described as a subtropical to tropical lowland plain by Bown, who further suggests the presence of streams and ponds. Based on the fossil bird remains, which includes the fossils of a variety of animals highly associated with water (ospreys, early flamingos, jacanas, herons, storks, cormorants and shoebills), Rasmussen and colleagues inferred that the environment featured slow-moving freshwater with a substantial amount of aquatic vegetation, which matches the prior hypothesis. Although lithology suggests that most fossils were deposited on sandbanks after being transported by currents, the authors argue that swamps could have easily formed along the banks of the river that was present during the Oligocene and may account for the mudstone found in certain quarries. They furthermore suggest that the fossil birds of Fayum, due to their affinities with modern groups, should be considered a more valuable indicator of the environment when compared with the fossil mammals, many of which belonged to families lacking modern examples. The absence of other birds typical for such an environment may be explained either through sampling bias or due to the fact that said groups had simply not yet been present in Oligocene Africa. Generally, Rasmussen and colleagues compare the environment of Jebel Qatrani to freshwater habitats in modern Central Africa. The discovery of snakehead fossils seem to support Rasmussen's interpretation, as the genus Parachanna today prefers slow-moving backwaters with plenty of vegetation. Other fish present meanwhile, notably Tylochromis, suggest that deep, open water was likewise present. The river channels may have been overgrown with reeds, papyrus and featured floating vegetation like water lilies and Salvinia. In a 2001 paper Rasmussen et al. argued that the sandstone and mudstone of the formation likely formed as sediments were aggraded by a system of river channels that emptied towards the west into the Tethys. Here they reconstructed the environment as a tropical lowland swamp forest intermingled with marshes. They furthermore suggest that the environment would have experienced monsoons. Overall this indicates that this region was a part of an extensive belt of tropical forest that stretched across what is now northern Africa, which would gradually give rise to open woodland and even steppe the further one was to travel inland.

== Paleobiota ==
=== Insecta ===
Name	Species	Member	Locality	Material	Made By	Image
Fleaglellius	F. pagodus	Lower Sequence	Three localities	Tower of approximately 35 vertically apposed chambers	Macrotermitinae?	
Krausichnus	K. trompitus; K. altus	Lower and Upper Sequence	Quarry E, I, M, R & X	Clustered system of 14 partially apposed spindles	Ants?	
Termitichnus	T. qatranii; T. simplicidens; cf.T. sp.	Lower and Upper Sequence	Up to 17 localities	Excavated subterranean nest system	Rhinotermitidae; Macrotermitinae; Hodotermitidae	
Vondrichnus	V. obovatus	Lower Sequence	Four localities	Complete chamber with several galleries exiting from the periphery	Macrotermitinae?	

=== Fish ===
Actinopterygii

Name	Species	Member	Locality	Material	Notes	Image
Alestidae indet.		Lower and Upper Sequence	Quarry E, I, M, R & X	Various teeth	Different teeth belonging to Characiformes, they are common across both fossil bearing members. A large range of tooth morphotypes is present in the formation, however this may not reflect the actual diversity of African tetra species present.	
Amiiformes indet.						
Chasmoclupea	C. aegyptiaca	Upper Sequence	Quarry O	Articulated 3-dimensional specimen	A clupeiform, inhabiting a riverine environment.	
Clarotes	C. eocenicus	Upper Sequence	Quarry L-41		A catfish inhabiting an oxbow lake environment, referrable to the extant genus Clarotes.	
Lates	L. qatraniensis	Lower and Upper Sequence	Quarry E, I, M & V	Two crania and various other isolated material.	Its absence from the lacustrine L-41 environment might indicate that the water was too shallow. Modern Lates can grow large and prefer large lakes and rivers.	
Parachanna	P. fayumensis	Lower and Upper Sequence	Quarry L-14, P & M	Various cranial remains including a dentary.	A snakehead fish, the Jebel Qatrani material may suggest that this group arrived in Africa earlier than it had been previously thought.	
Siluriformes indet.		Lower and Upper Sequence	Quarry L-41, B, G, E, I, J, K, M, P & V	Three skulls and various postcranial remains, predominantly fin spines.	The three known skulls are approximately the same size, but may not represent the same taxon. The postcranial elements indicate a greater size range. In some aspects the Jebel Qatrani catfish resemble the genus Fajumia.	
cf. Tylochromis		Lower and Upper Sequence	Quarry E, I & X	A lower jaw and additional material including teeth.	A basal cichlid.	

Chondrichthyes

Name	Species	Member	Locality	Material	Notes	Image
Dasyatoidea indet.						
Lamniformes indet.						

Sarcopterygii

Name	Species	Member	Locality	Material	Notes	Image
Dipnoi indet.			Quarry L-41			

=== Reptiles ===
Name	Species	Member	Locality	Material	Notes	Image
Albertwoodemys	A. testudinum	Lower Sequence	A locality west of the AMNH quarries.	A partial plastron with articulated peripheral elements of the upper shell.	A side-necked turtle of the family Podocnemididae with a high-domed shell likely similar to tortoises. It may be a related taxon to specimen UCMP 42008, from the Miocene of Kenya.	
Andrewsemys	A. libyca		North of Lake Qarun	Various shell remains.	A side-necked turtle of the family Podocnemididae previously known as "Stereogenys" lybica. The holotype specimen, among the best preserved turtle shells from Fayum, was thought to be lost before being rediscovered and used to erect a new genus. Several additional specimens are known from the Jebel Qatrani and its underlying formations.	
Crocodylus	C. megarhinus			Various cranial and mandibular remains	A large and broad-snouted species of crocodilian incorrectly assigned to Crocodylus. A second Fayum crocodile, "Crocodylus" articeps, has been considered a younger individual of this species by Christopher Brochu.	
Dacquemys	D. paleomorpha	Lower Sequence	Quarry B	A nearly complete skull	A side-necked turtle of the family Podocnemididae that may be a related taxon to specimen UCMP 42008. It is possible that Dacquemys represents skull material of Albertwoodemys.	
Eogavialis	E. africanum				An early genus of gavialoid common in the formation. Two species have originally been named from Jebel Qatrani,Eogavialis gavialoides and Eogavialis tenuirostre (both originally as Tomistoma), however recent research suggests that all Fayum Eogavialis species including those of other formations in the region may simply represent a single species.	
Gigantochersina	G. ammon	Lower Sequence	Quarry A & B	Multiple specimens including a nearly complete carapace and plastron as well as a partial pelvis	The oldest known tortoise from Africa. Testudo beadnelli and Testudo isis were both named, but have since then been synonymized with G. ammon.	
Neochelys	N. fajumensis	Lower and Upper Sequence	Quarry L-41, A, B, C, I, M, O, P & R	Various remains of the plastron and carapace as well as skull material.	A side-necked turtle of the family Podocnemididae, similar to Erymnochelys and previously assigned to said genus. The type specimen, an anterior plastron, has potentially been lost. They are among the most common fossils in the quarries L-41, I and M.	
Varanidae	Indeterminate.	Upper Sequence	Quarry I	A presacral vertebra	I single bone described by Smith et al. and originally assigned to the genus Varanus. Later research by Holmes et al. suggests it was a stem-varanid, distinct from other remains found in the formation.	
Varanus	Indeterminate.	Upper Sequence	Quarry I & M	Vertebrae	Isolated bones described by Holmes et al. and considered to be part of the modern genus Varanus. They argue that this represents the oldest known member of the genus and indicates an African origin for modern monitor lizards.	

=== Birds ===
Accipitriformes

Name	Species	Member	Locality	Material	Notes	Image
Accipitridae indet., aff. Haliaeetus		Lower Sequence	Quarry A	The distal end of a tarsometatarsus.	A bird of prey similar in size and morphology to the modern sea eagles. The early strata of the formation indicate closer proximity to the shore, possibly supporting a lifestyle similar to modern Haliaeetus species.	
Pandionidae indet., aff. Pandion		Upper Sequence	Quarry M	The distal end of a humerus.	A fossil nearly identical to the extant osprey, but smaller.	
Pandionidae? indet.		Upper Sequence	Quarry I	A damaged carpometacarpus.	A raptorial bird approximately the size of the extant osprey, however more robust.	

Charadriiformes

Name	Species	Member	Locality	Material	Notes	Image
Janipes	J. nymphaeobates	Upper Sequence	Quarry M	The distal end of a tarsometatarsus	A large species of jacana, exceeding all modern taxa in size but still smaller than Nupharanassa bulotorum. The Fayum jacanas already show signs of a lifestyle like that of their modern relatives and subsequently may indicate a dense floating vegetation.	
Nupharanassa	N. bulotorum	Upper Sequence	Quarry M	Multiple specimens preserving the tarsometatarsus.	A large species of jacana, between 30 and 35% larger than the largest extant species, the bronze-winged jacana.	
Nupharanassa	N. tolutaria	Lower Sequence	Quarry E	The distal end of a tarsometatarsus.	A smaller relative of Nupharanassa bulotorum, it is distinguished by its much smaller size and older age. It is the only known jacana in the lower sequence of the Jebel Qatrani Formation.	

Ciconiiformes

Name	Species	Member	Locality	Material	Notes	Image
Palaeoephippiorhynchus	P. dietrichi	Upper Sequence	Quarry M	A nearly complete rostrum with mandible and partial cranium and the distal end of a right tibiotarsus.	A large stork comparable in size to the modern jabiru and marabou stork. While the type material bears great resemblance to the extant saddlebill, a tibiotarsus found in a different quarry shares no similarities with any modern taxa and may or may not belong to Palaeoephippiorhynchus.	

Cuculiformes

Name	Species	Member	Locality	Material	Notes	Image
Musophagidae indet., aff. Crinifer		Upper Sequence	Quarry M	The distal ends of a tarsometatarsus and a humerus.	A relatively large type of turaco and among the earliest recorded members of the group. It shares similarities to the extant genus Crinifer.	

Gruiformes

Name	Species	Member	Locality	Material	Notes	Image
Gruidae indet.		Upper Sequence	Quarry M	The distal end and partial shaft of a tarsometatarsus.	A bird bearing resemblance to modern crowned cranes, cranes of the genus Grus and the limpkin. Its size is between that of the limpkin and the demoiselle crane, although closer to the former.	
Rallidae indet.		Upper Sequence	Quarry M	The distal end of a tarsometatarsus.	Possibly a type of rail bearing resemblance to the genera Sarothrura, Coturnicops and Laterallus.	

Palaeognathae

Name	Species	Member	Material	Notes	Image
Eremopezus	E. eocaenus	Lower Sequence	Various fragmentary leg bones including the distal end of a tibiotarsus and the distal end of a tarsometatarsus.	An enigmatic large groundbird comparable in size to a modern rhea. It was initially thought to be a type of ratite, but its relationship with other birds has repeatedly been questioned. Stromeria fajumensis, found in the same formation, is thought to be synonymous with Eremopezus.	

Pelecaniformes

Name	Species	Member	Locality	Material	Notes	Image
Ardeidae indet.		Upper Sequence	Quarry I & M	A partial rostrum, a distal tarsometatarsus of a juvenile specimen and the first phalanx of the third toe.	A medium-sized heron comparable in size to the reddish egret and the great white egret. The lack of overlapping material means that it is uncertain if these fossils represent one or several species.	
Goliathia	G. andrewsi	Lower and Upper Sequence	Quarry M	A complete ulna and the distal end of a tarsometatarsus.	A large relative of the modern shoebill.	
Nycticorax	N. sp.	Upper Sequence	Quarry M	A nearly complete tarsometatarsus and a coracoid.	A bird whose remains are described as being identical to that of the extant black-crowned night heron, indicating that night herons diverged from other herons at least 31 million years ago.	
Xenerodiops	X. mycter	Upper Sequence	Quarry I & M	A nearly complete rostrum and a humerus lacking its distal end.	An unusual heron with a heavy and downwards curved beak.	

Phoenicopteriformes

Name	Species	Member	Locality	Material	Notes	Image
Phoenicopteridae indet. Species 1, aff. Palaelodus		Upper Sequence	Quarry M & I	Multiple specimens including the tibiotarsus and parts of the metacarpals.	Several bones of the Fayum phoenicopteriform show both similarities to derived flamingos as well as to the more basal Palaeolodus, which Rasmussen and colleagues considered Phoenicopterids rather than placing it within its own family. The material suggests a bird approximately the size of Palaelodus gracilipes.	
Phoenicopteridae indet. Species 2		Upper Sequence	Quarry M	A coracoid fragment	A second, larger phoenicopteriform, closer in size to Palaeolodus crassipes and the lesser flamingo.	

Suliformes

Name	Species	Member	Locality	Material	Notes	Image
Phalacrocoracidae	Indeterminate.	Upper Sequence	Quarry M	A distal premaxilla.	An indetermined cormorant showing a more gradually tapering and more strongly hooked beak. Among modern cormorants, it most closely resembles the guanay cormorant.	

=== Mammals ===
Afroinsectivora

Name	Species	Member	Locality	Material	Notes	Image
Eochrysochloris	E. tribosphenus	Lower Sequence	Quarry E		A tiny member of the Afrosoricida.	
Herodotius	H. pattersoni	Lower Sequence	Quarry L-41	Fossils of the dentary and maxilla.	A species of elephant shrew.	
Jawharia	J. tenrecoides	Lower Sequence	Quarry E		A relative of tenrecs and golden moles.	
Metoldobotes	M. stromeri				A genus of elephant shrew.	
Qatranilestes	Q. oligocaenus	Upper Sequence	Quarry I	A badly preserved mandible.	The most derived member of the Afrosoricida in the formation.	
Widanelfarasia	W. bowni	Lower Sequence	Quarry L-41		A stem-afrosoricid.	
Widanelfarasia	W. rasmusseni	Lower Sequence	Quarry L-41		A stem-afrosoricid.	

Artiodactyla

Name	Species	Member	Locality	Material	Notes	Image
Bothriogenys	B. andrewsi	Upper Sequence	L-75	Teeth and dentary remains.	A large anthracothere from the uppermost levels of the formation, it may have been most closely related to B. fraasi, either through anagenesis or by splitting from the B. fraasi lineage.	Bothriogenys fraasi (foreground)
Bothriogenys	B. fraasi	Upper Sequence	Quarry I		A species of Bothriogenys arising from B. gorringei. It may have either split into two lineages or given rise to B. andrewsi through anagenesis.	Bothriogenys fraasi (foreground)
Bothriogenys	B. gorringei	Lower and Upper Sequence	Quarry A, B & M	Originally described based on a mandible.	The oldest species of Bothriogenys in Jebel Qatrani, it may have split into two lineages giving rise to B. fraasi and B. rugulosus. It may have been a semi-aquatic browser or grazer, feeding primarily on foliage. Though typical for the lower sequence, material tentatively assigned to this species have been recovered from Quarry M as well.	Bothriogenys fraasi (foreground)
Bothriogenys	B. rugulosus	Upper Sequence			A species of Bothriogenys that likely evolved from B. gorringei.	Bothriogenys fraasi (foreground)
Nabotherium	N. aegyptiacum			A partial skull, several fossils of the mandible and maxilla as well as isolated teeth.	An anthracothere with well developed canine teeth. Its dentition is better suited to crushing fruit rather than slicing vegetation.	
Qatraniodon	Q. parvus	Lower Sequence		The holotype consists of a partial mandible.	The smallest anthracothere from the Jebel Qatrani Formation and not as common than Bothriogenys.	

Chiroptera

Name	Species	Member	Locality	Material	Notes	Image
Dhofarella	D. sigei	Lower Sequence	Quarry L-41	A left dentary.	A type of sheath-tailed bat.	
Khonsunycteris	K. aegypticus	Lower Sequence	Quarry L-41	A left dentary.	A type of vesper bat.	
Phasmatonycteris	P. phiomensis	Upper Sequence	Quarry I	Dentary remains.	A type of sucker-footed bat.	
Philisis	P. sphingis	Upper Sequence	Quarry I	Material of the maxilla and dentary.	A philisid bat related to the older Witwatia from Birket Qarun.	
Saharaderma	S. pseudovampyrus	Lower Sequence	Quarry L-41	A right dentary.	A type of false vampire bat.	
Vampyravus	V. orientalis	Upper Sequence		A large humerus.	A bat of uncertain affinities. It was the first fossil bat discovered in Africa and the largest bat of the Fayum succession, weighing up to 120 g (4.2 oz). This puts it within the size range of the Egyptian fruit bat.	

Embrithopoda

Name	Species	Member	Locality	Material	Notes	Image
Arsinoitherium	A. zitteli	Lower and Upper Sequence	Just above Quarry L-41 to Quarry M, spanning most of the sequence.		A large arsinoitheriid embrithopod well known for its two horns. A large amount of material is known and in the past a second species from Jebel Qatrani, A. andrewsi, has been proposed. Some researchers however consider it to be a synonym of A. zitteli with the differences possibly being caused by sexual dimorphism.	Arsinoitherium zitteli skull

Hyaenodonta

Name	Species	Member	Locality	Material	Notes	Image
Akhnatenavus	A. leptognathus	Lower Sequence	Quarry A	A slender mandible.	A member of the Hyainailourinae, it was originally described as Pterodon leptognathus. It was smaller than the two other "Pterodon" species from Jebel Qatrani and Metapterodon.	
Akhnatenavus	A. nefertiticyon	Lower Sequence	Quarry L-41	A complete cranium as well as a palate and dentary.	A second species of Akhnatenavus smaller than A. leptognathus. The skull also appears to have been much shorter than in the type species. Calculations resulted in an average bodymass of 19.2 kg (42 lb), approximately as large as a Eurasian lynx or wolverine.	
Apterodon	A. altidens	Lower Sequence		Described based on a maxilla.	Although named in 1910, A. altidens was not properly described until 1911. A mandible was also referred to this species, but this decision has been considered dubious by Lange-Badré and Böhme.	
Apterodon	A. macrognathus	Lower Sequence	Quarry A & B	Skulls and mandibles	A hyaenodont originally described as a species of Pterodon.	
Bastetodon	B. syrtos	Upper Sequence	Quarry M	A right maxilla fragment.		
Brychotherium	B. ephalmos	Lower Sequence	Quarry L-41	Multiple lower jaws and parts of the rostrum.	A teratodontine hyaenodont approximately as heavy as a modern red fox or American badger. Although the name was coined in a dissertation in 1994, it was not formally described until 2016.	
Falcatodon	F. schlosseri	Upper Sequence	Quarry V	Described based on a left dentary.	Erected by Holroyd as a species of Metapterodon, it was even then noted to be possibly distinct. Morales and Pickford later raised it to a distinct genus. There may be additional material from Quarry B in the lower sequence, however the assignment of said fossils is only tentative.	
Masrasector	M. aegypticum	Upper Sequence	Quarry G	Dental remains	A teratodontine hyaenodont smaller than Brychotherium.	
Masrasector	M. nananubis	Lower Sequence	Quarry L-41	Skulls, mandibles and multiple humeri.	A smaller species of Masrasector from older deposits. Its estimated body size was within the range of modern striped skunks and small-spotted genets. The limb bones indicate it was a fast runner that could have hunted the local rodents.	
Metapterodon	M. brachycephalus	Lower Sequence	Quarry A	A left dentary.	Named as a species of Hyaenodon, it was eventually placed in Metapterodon by Holroyd. While Morales and Pickford restrict the genus to the Miocene and place Holroyd's other species in separate genera, they do not mention M. brachycephalus.	
Metasinopa	M. fraasi	Upper Sequence		A nearly complete lower jaw.	A possible relative to teratodontines, although its exact relationship with other hyaenodontids needs more testing. It was larger than Masrasector.	
Quasiapterodon	Q. minutus	Upper Sequence			Originally named as a species of Apterodon alongside A. altidens, later research showed it clearly differed from this genus. It may instead be related to "Sinope" ethiopica.	
Sectisodon	S. markgrafi			A left maxilla.	S. markgrafi was initially named by Holroyd as a species of Metapterodon in 1999, but placed in the new genus Sectisodon by Morales and Pickford in 2017.	
Sekhmetops	S. africanus	Lower Sequence	Quarry A	Mandibles, a rostrum and an assigned neck vertebra.	The first hyaenodont described from Fayum.	
Sekhmetops	S. phiomensis	Lower Sequence	Quarry A	A mandible smaller than that of S. africanus.		
Sinopa	S. ethiopica			A mandibular ramus.	A hyaenodont originally described as a species of Sinopa, although later research clearly shows that it does not belong to the American-Asian genus. Its exact relation to other hyaenodonts remains uncertain until further study, however it has been suggested to be a relative of Quasiapterodon.	

Holroyd also identified several indetermined pterodontine hyaenodonts from various sequences of the Jebel Qatrani Formation, but doesn't identify them beyond subfamily level.

Hyracoidea

Name	Species	Member	Locality	Material	Notes	Image
Antilohyrax	A. pectidens	Lower Sequence	Quarry L-41	Mandibles, a crushed cranium as well as various incomplete skull fossils and postcranial elements.	A gazelle-like titanohyracine described in 2000. The teeth and limb bones indicate that it was a cursorial browser, similar to modern antelopes and gazelles.	
Bunohyrax	B. fajumensis	Lower and Upper Sequence		Described based on a mandible.	Bunohyrax species were medium-sized hyracoids somewhat resembling pigs in their dentition. They may have been related to Pachyhyrax.	
Bunohyrax	B. major	Upper Sequence		Described based on three premolars.	Originally named Geniohyus major, B. major is larger than B. fajumensis. Additionally, its teeth are more bunodont.	
Bunohyrax	B. sp.	Lower Sequence	Quarry L-41			
Geniohyus	G. diphycus	Lower Sequence			A medium-sized species. Geniohyus is among the rarer hyracoids of Jebel Qatrani.	
Geniohyus	G. magnus	Lower and Upper Sequence	Quarry V	Various skull remains including maxillary fragments and dentary remains.	It is the smallest species of Geniohyus, with the name originating when it was still considered a part of Saghatherium. Its dentition forms an intermediate between other Geniohyus and Bunohyrax.	
Geniohyus	G. mirus	Lower Sequence		Described based on a mandible.	The largest of the three named Fayum Geniohyus species and the type species.	
Geniohyus	G. sp.	Lower Sequence	Quarry L-41		Geniohyus takes the species name from their morphological similarities to pigs, with early research even classifying them as suids.	
Megalohyrax	M. eocaenus	Upper Sequence		Described based on premaxillary and maxillary material. Also includes mandibular remains.	Megalohyrax show strong sexual dimorphism in regards to their body size. It was a common genus in formation.	
Megalohyrax	M. sp.	Lower Sequence	Quarry L-41		An unnamed species of Megalohyrax preserving an interior mandibular fenestra unlike the younger M. eocaenus.	
Pachyhyrax	P. crassidentatus	Upper Sequence	Quarry I, L-46 & M	Skulls, mandibles and teeth including the complete but crushed skull of a young individual.	A hyracoid resembling the contemporary anthracothere Bothriogenys. It is possible that it was a semi-aquatic herbivore.	
Saghatherium	S. antiquum	Lower Sequence		Described based on a maxilla	Saghatherium had heavy jaws and possibly fed on nuts and seeds. Furthermore, members of this genus display pronounced sexual dimorphism and may have had complex mating rituals. The species S. sobrina was shown to simply represent female individuals of this species.	
Saghatherium	S. humarum	Upper Sequence	Quarry V	Dentaries and teeth.	A small Saghatherium species that differs due to the presence of an internal chamber in the mandible.	
Saghatherium	S. bowni	Lower Sequence	Quarry L-41		A common species of Saghatherium named in 1991.	
Selenohyrax	S. chatrathi	Upper Sequence	Quarry V	Several mandibles.	A hyracoid named for its selenodont teeth (molars with crescent-shaped ridges), which are much more developed than in Titanohyrax. These teeth indicate a diet that required it to slice vegetation rather than grind it. It is a small hyrax, only slightly larger than Saghatherium which it might have descended from.	
Thyrohyrax	T. domorictus	Upper Sequence	Quarry I, G, L-46, M, P, R, V & X	Primarily mandibular remains and teeth, but also some limb elements and vertebrae.	Thyrohyrax is among the smaller hyracoids of Fayum and resembles today's arboreal Dendrohyrax. Species of Thyrohyrax display little size-related sexual dimorphism, however males do possess enlarged, tusk-like second incisors and chambered mandibles.	
Thyrohyrax	T. litholagus	Lower Sequence	Quarry L-41		A relative of the younger Thyrohyrax pygmaeus, it was somewhat larger than T. meyeri.	
Thyrohyrax	T. meyeri	Lower Sequence	Quarry L-41		T. meyeri was very similar to the younger T. domorictus and may have been a close relative.	
Thyrohyrax	T. pygmaeus	Lower Sequence	Quarry A-1	The front of a skull with an associated mandible as well as several teeth from another specimen.	A close relative of direct descendant of T. litholagus. It was originally assigned to Saghatherium magnum, then described as a species of Megalohyrax before being moved into Pachyhyrax and eventually Thyrohyrax.	
Titanohyrax	T. andrewsi	Lower Sequence		Five specimens including two mandibles and a single maxilla.	Titanohyrax species are the largest hyracoids of the Fayum Depression and form the clade Titanohyracinae with Antilohyrax. Like their smaller relative, they are thought to have been folivores. The lower incisors of T. andrewsi were shaped like spatulas, rather than tusks.	
Titanohyrax	T. angustidens	Upper Sequence	Quarry V, R & I	Eight specimens including maxillary, premaxillary and mandibular remains.	T. angustidens has the most complex history among Titanohyrax species, initially assigned to Megalohyrax and given the name M. palaeotheroides, it was later recognized as Titanohyrax and variably considered distinct or synonymous with T. andrewsi. The name T. palaeotheroides was not retained as it was a nomen nudum.	
Titanohyrax	T. ultimus	Upper Sequence		Four heavily worn teeth.	The largest species of Titanohyrax, weight estimates for T. ultimus range from 600–1,300 kg (1,300–2,900 lb), making it possibly as large as the modern sumatran rhino.	
Titanohyrax	T. sp.	Lower Sequence	Quarry L-41		An unnamed species from the L-41 Quarry.	

Marsupalia

Name	Species	Member	Locality	Material	Notes	Image
Peratherium	P. africanum	Upper Sequence	Quarry M	Several specimens including a maxilla and three mandibles	A primitive marsupial and the basalmost mammal found in the sediments of the formation. It was at one point known under the name Qatranitherium, however this name has since then been deemed a junior synonym.	

Rodentia

Name	Species	Member	Locality	Material	Notes	Image
Acritophiomys	A. adaios	Lower Sequence	Quarry A, B & E		This species also includes several specimen previously assigned to Phiomys andrewsi. However, as it was not adequately described it is considered a nomen nudum.	
Acritophiomys	A. bowni	Lower Sequence	Quarry L-41	Complete upper and lower dentition as well as parts of the lower jaw and the skull.	A basal member of Phiomorpha and the largest member of the family "Phiomyidae", although the group is now considered to be paraphyletic. It is the only species of Acritophiomys that had been validly named, as both A. adaios and A. woodi were only described in a thesis.	
Acritophiomys	A. woodi	Lower Sequence	Quarry L-41		The first phiomydid described from the Quarry L-41. However, as it was not adequately described it is considered a nomen nudum.	
Birkamys	B. korai	Lower Sequence	Quarry L-41	Cranial and mandibular remains with teeth, including a partially preserved rostrum.	A close relative of Mubhammys.	
Gaudeamus	G. aegyptius	Lower Sequence	Quarry E	Mandibles and teeth	The type species of the genus, described by Wood in the 1960s. It is intermediate in size among the Fayum rodents, larger than the small Phiocricetomys but smaller than Metaphiomys. Its phylogeny is enigmatic and it has variably been placed as a sister to old world porcupines or within Caviomorpha.	
Gaudeamus	G. aslius	Lower Sequence	Quarry L-41	A distorted skull and various fragmentary remains.	It shows several primitive features and may resemble the ancestral form of this genus.	
Gaudeamus	G. hylaeus	Lower Sequence	Quarry L-41	A flattened skull and various additional fragments.	G. hylaeus was initially named by Holroyd in a PhD Thesis, rendering it a nomen nudum until the full description authored by Sallam, Seiffert and Simons.	
Metaphiomys	M. beadnelli	Upper Sequence		A left mandible and additional material.	A phiomyid rodent.	
Metaphiomys	M. schaubi				A second species of Metaphiomys described by Wood in the 1960s.	
Monamys	M. simonsi	Upper Sequence	Quarry I & M	Mandibular remains and teeth.	Previously known as Paraphiomys simonsi, later research has shown that this genus is distinct from the much later Miocene Paraphiomys.	
Mubhammys	M. vadumensis	Lower Sequence	Quarry L-41	Cranial and mandibular elements with teeth.	A close relative of Birkamys.	
Phiocricetomys	P. minutus	Upper Sequence	Quarry I	A mandible preserving dentition from the 4th deciduous premolar to 2nd molar.	The youngest known member of Phiocricetomyinae.	
Phiomys	P. andrewsi	Lower Sequence	Quarry A & B	Described based on partial mandibles.	A phiomyid rodent.	
Phiomys	P. paraphiomyoides				A phiomyid described by Wood in the 1960s.	
Qatranimys	Q. safroutus	Lower Sequence	Quarry L-41	Skull remains and teeth.	A diminutive phiocricetomyine rodent.	
Talahphiomys	T. lavocati	Lower Sequence	Quarry E	Deciduous premolars and molars.	Initially thought to be a species of Phiomys, it was named Elwynomys in a doctoral dissertation from 1994. Due to the rules of the ICZN, the name Talahphiomys later took precedence.	

Pholidota

Name	Species	Member	Locality	Material	Notes	Image
Pholidota		Upper Sequence	Quarry M & L-12	Two finger bones.	The fragmentary remains of what may have been a pangolin. The presence of termite nests bearing excavation marks may support this, however the identity of these finger bones is not universally supported and has been questioned.	

Ptolemaiida

Name	Species	Member	Locality	Material	Notes	Image
Cleopatrodon	C. ayeshae	Upper Sequence	Quarry V	Mandibular remains and teeth.	A ptolemaiid afrothere. The type species of Cleopatrodon.	
Cleopatrodon	C. robusta	Upper Sequence	Quarry I	Mandibular remains and teeth.	C. robusta had more robust jaws than C. ayeshae.	
Ptolemaia	P. grangeri	Upper Sequence	Quarry V	Multiple teeth and a mandibular ramus as well as an almost complete but distorted skull.	A carnivorous afrotherian mammal of the family Ptolemaiidae. It is larger than the older P. lyonsi.	
Ptolemaia	P. lyonsi	Lower Sequence	Quarry A	Lower jaw material.	A carnivorous afrothere first described by Osborn in 1908.	Ptolemaia lyonsi jaw
Qarunavus	Q. meyeri	Lower Sequence	Quarry A	Mandibular material of a juvenile.	A ptolemaiid afrothere. Despite being from a younger animal, the material of Q. meyeri is larger than that of Ptolemaia lyonsi which is known from the same locality. Simons and Rasmussen suggest it may have been a racoon-like omnivore.	

Primates

Name	Species	Member	Locality	Material	Notes	Image
Aegyptopithecus	A. zeuxis	Upper Sequence		Mandibular fragments and complete skulls of both males and females.	A propliopithecid primate from the upper sequences of the formation. It may be synonymous with Propliopithecus.	
Aframonius	A. dieides	Lower Sequence	Quarry L-41	Three partial mandibles.	An adapid primate	
Afrotarsius	A. chatrathi	Upper Sequence	Quarry M	A single mandible.	A primate of controversial classification. It reached an estimated bodymass of 130–300 g (4.6–10.6 oz).	
Anchomomys	A. milleri	Lower Sequence	Quarry L-41			
Apidium	A. bowni	Upper Sequence	Quarry V			
Apidium	A. moustafai	Upper Sequence	Quarry G			
Apidium	A. phiomense	Upper Sequence		Various remains including cranial and limb bones.	A parapithecid primate known from a rich fossil record. Apidium phiomense is the type species and one of the first primates described from Jebel Qatrani.	
Arsinoea	A. kallimos	Lower Sequence	Quarry L-41	A mandible with teeth	A parapithecid primate.	
Catopithecus	C. browni	Lower Sequence	Quarry L-41	Over 16 specimens including crania, mandibles and postcranial remains.	A very common species of oligopithecid. It was similar in size to large callitrichid primates and smaller night monkeys, squirrel monkeys and titi monkeys. Its teeth suggest a diet of leaves.	
Oligopithecus	O. savagei	Lower Sequence	Quarry E	A partial hemimandible and isolated teeth.	A rarer species of oligopithecid. Members of this family are almost absent in the upper sequence of the formation, which may be a delayed result of climate change during the Eocene-Oligocene transition. The teeth of Oligopithecus indicate it may have been a frugivore.	
Oligopithecidae	Indeterminate.	Upper Sequence	Quarry M	A left hemimandible with alveoli for all teeth and a single, mostly complete molar tooth.	The smallest known oligopithecid and one of the smallest anthropoids. It is comparable in body mass to modern marmosets of the genus Callithrix and has been noted to be smaller than the fat-tailed dwarf lemur.	
Parapithecus	P. fraasi	Upper Sequence		A complete mandible.	A parapithecid primate. It has been suggested to by a synonym of Apidium, however this view is not universally accepted.	
Plesiopithecus	P. teras	Lower Sequence	Quarry L-41	A mandible and a nearly complete skull.	An enigmatic lemur-like primate belonging to the family Plesiopithecidae. It may be related to the modern aye-aye.	
Propliopithecus	P. ankeli	Upper Sequence	Quarry V	Dental material.	A propliopithecid primate from the upper sequences of the formation. Moeripithecus and Aelopithecus considered to be a synonym of this taxon.	
Propliopithecus	P. haeckeli			Multiple remains.	A propliopithecid primate from the upper sequences of the formation. Moeripithecus and Aelopithecus considered to be a synonym of this taxon.	
Proteopithecus	P. sylviae	Lower Sequence	Quarry L-41	A left maxillary fragment and additional remains including a partial skull.	A proteopithecid primate.	
Qatrania	Q. basiodontos	Lower Sequence	Quarry L-41	Mandibular remains	Originally described as Abuqatrania basiodontos.	
Qatrania	Q. fleaglei	Upper Sequence	Quarry M	A fragmentary hemimandible.	A parapithecid primate with an estimated bodymass of 300–500 g (11–18 oz).	
Qatrania	Q. wingi	Lower Sequence	Quarry E	Fragmentary dentail remains.	A small parapithecid primate weighing less than 300 g (11 oz).	
Serapia	S. eocaena	Lower Sequence	Quarry L-41	A partial mandible	A proteopithecid primate.	
Simonsius	S. grangeri	Upper Sequence	Quarry I	A mandibular fragment.	A disputed genus of proteopithecid primate. It was originally named as a species of Parapithecus, but later raised to its own genus. However, this is not universally accepted.	
Wadilemur	W. elegans	Lower Sequence	Quarry L-41		A possible lorisiform.	

Proboscidea

Name	Species	Member	Locality	Material	Notes	Image
Moeritherium	Mo. trigodon			A right mandibular ramus and other remains.	A small, possibly semi-aquatic proboscidean roughly the size of a tapir. M. trigodon has some features of its dentition that may suggest that it could be a genus distinct from Moeritherium. Another species was also named from the formation, M. andrewsi, but modern research has drastically cut down on the number of valid species, with most now being lumped into either the type species of M. trigodon.	
Palaeomastodon	P. beadnelli			Mandibular remains.	An early proboscidean named by Andrews in 1901. It is the type species of the genus Palaeomastodon. Unlike Moeritherium, Palaeomastodon and Phiomia are considered to have been terrestrial animals.	
Palaeomastodon	P. minor				A species distinguished from P. beadnelli through its smaller size. The status of most Palaeomastodon species is complex and has been discussed repeatedly.	
Palaeomastodon	P. parvus				Another small species of Palaeomastodon.	
Palaeomastodon	P. wintoni				Although morphologically similar to P. minor it was slightly larger, but fails to approach the size of the type species. It is the most common species in the formation.	
Phiomia	P. serridens			Various remains	Although multiple species have been named in the past, Phiomia serridens is currently the only valid species of this genus native to Fayum. Species of Palaeomastodon were at times also assigned to Phiomia.	

Sirenia

Name	Species	Member	Locality	Material	Notes	Image
Eosiren	E. imenti	Upper Sequence	Quarry O	Skull and ribs.	E. imenti is the most derived member of the genus Eosiren and had an elongated head.	

=== Flora ===
Name	Species	Member	Locality	Material	Notes	Image
Bombacoxylon	B. oweni			Fossilized wood	A "Bombacaceae".	
Terminalioxylon	T. intermedium			Fossilized wood	A white mangrove.	
Terminalioxylon	T. primigenium			Fossilized wood	A white mangrove.	
Detarioxylon	D. aegyptiacum			Fossilized wood	A legume.	
Leguminoxylon	L. sp.			Fossilized wood	A legume.	
Ficoxylon	F. blanckenhorni			Fossilized wood	A fig.	
Palmoxylon	P. aschersoni			Fossilized wood	A palm tree.	
Palmoxylon	P. geometricum			Fossilized wood	A palm tree.	
Palmoxylon	P. lacunosum			Fossilized wood	A palm tree.	
Palmoxylon	P. libycum			Fossilized wood	A palm tree.	
Palmoxylon	P. pondicherriense			Fossilized wood	A palm tree.	
Sapindoxylon	S. stromeri			Fossilized wood	A soapberry.	
Sterculioxylon	S. giarabubense			Fossilized wood	A "Sterculiaceae".	
Tamaricoxylon	T. africanum			Fossilized wood	A tamarisk.	
Phragmites	P. australis			Silicified culms.	Reeds commonly found in association with Tamaricoylon.	
Accrostichum	A. sp.			Fossilized leaves.	A Polypodiaceae fern.	
Stenochlaena	S. sp.			Fossilized leaves.	A Polypodiaceae fern.	
Salvinia	S. sp.			Fossilized leaves.	A Salviniaceae fern.	
Palmae indet.	Gen. et spe. indet.			Fossilized leaves.	A palm.	
Typhaceae indet.	Gen. et spe. indet.			Fossilized leaves.	A cattail similar to the genus Typha.	
Litsea	L. engelhardti			Fossilized leaves.	A laurel.	
Cynometra	C. sp.			Fossilized leaves.	A legume.	
Ficus	F. leucopteroides			Fossilized leaves.	A fig.	
Ficus	F. stromeri			Fossilized leaves.	A fig.	
Maesa	M. zitteli			Fossilized leaves.	A myrsine.	
Nelumbo	N. sp.			Fossilized leaves.	A lotus.	
?Nymphaeites	?N. sp.			Fossilized leaves.	A water lily.	
Ochnaceae indet.	Gen. et spe. indet.			Fossilized leaves.	An Ochnaceae.	
Sapotaceae indet.	Gen. et spe. indet.			Fossilized leaves.	A Sapotaceae.	
Triplochiton	T. sp.			Fossilized leaves.	A Sterculiaceae.	
Dicotyledon	Gen. et spe. indet.			Fossilized leaves.	Seven indeterminate types of dicot.	
Epipremnum	E. sp.			Fossilized fruits.	An arum.	
Palmae indet.	Gen. et spe. indet.			Fossilized fruits.	A palm fruit.	
Anacardiaceae indet.	Gen. et spe. indet.			Fossilized fruits.	A cashew.	
Anonaspermum	A. spp.			Fossilized fruits.	Two species of soursops.	
Canarium	C. sp.			Fossilized fruits.	An incense tree fruit.	
Icacinicarya	I. sp.			Fossilized fruits.	A white pear.	
Eohypserpa	E. sp.			Fossilized fruits.	A moonseed.	
Securidaca	S. tertiaria			Fossilized fruits.	A milkwort.	
Tamarix	T. sp.			Silicified roots.	A tamarisk.	
Macroalgae	Gen. and spe. indet.			Fossilized thalloids.	Algae.	

== See also ==
- Geologic formations of Egypt
- List of fossil sites
