= Erik Seiffert =

American palaeontologist

Erik R. Seiffert
- Citizenship: American
- Scientific career
- Fields: Palaeomammalogy
- Workplaces: Keck School of Medicine, University of Southern California

Erik Seiffert is an American palaeontologist best known for his study of Cenozoic mammal faunas of Afro-Arabia.

== Career ==
In 2016, Seiffert received the Robert W. Sussman Award for Scientific Contributions to Anthropology.

Below is a list of taxa that Seiffert has contributed to naming:

Year	Taxon	Authors
2026	Masripithecus moghraensis gen. et sp. nov.	Al-Ashqar, Seiffert, El-Sayed, Salem, Gohar, El-Saka, Amin, & Sallam
2024	Nengohyrax josephi gen. et sp. nov.	Vitek, Seiffert, Heritage, Gaiku, Feibel, Sousa, Nengo, Aoron, & Princehouse
2024	Abdahyrax philipi gen. et sp. nov.	Vitek, Seiffert, Heritage, Gaiku, Feibel, Sousa, Nengo, Aoron, & Princehouse
2024	Thyrohyrax lokutani sp. nov.	Vitek, Seiffert, Heritage, Gaiku, Feibel, Sousa, Nengo, Aoron, & Princehouse
2024	Thyrohyrax ekaii sp. nov.	Vitek, Seiffert, Heritage, Gaiku, Feibel, Sousa, Nengo, Aoron, & Princehouse
2024	Geniohyus ewoii sp. nov.	Vitek, Seiffert, Heritage, Gaiku, Feibel, Sousa, Nengo, Aoron, & Princehouse
2024	Eliwourus topernawiensis gen. et sp. nov.	Seiffert, Heritage, De Vries, Sallam, Vitek, Aoron, & Princehouse
2023	Tutcetus rayanensis gen. et sp. nov.	Antar, Gohar, El-Desouky, Seiffert, El-Sayed, Claxton, & Sallam
2021	Qatranimys safroutus gen. et sp. nov.	Al-Ashqar, Seiffert, De Vries, El-Sayed, Antar, & Sallam
2021	Phiomicetus anubis gen. et sp. nov.	Gohar, Antar, Boessenecker, Sabry, El-Sayed, Seiffert, Zalmout, & Sallam
2018	Mansourasaurus shahinae gen. et sp. nov.	Sallam, Gorscak, O'Connor, El-Dawoudi, El-Sayed, Saber, Kora, Sertich, Seiffert, & Lamanna
2018	Masradapis tahai gen. et sp. nov.	Seiffert, Boyer, Fleagle, Gunnell, Heesy, Perry, & Sallam
2017	Qarmoutus hitanensis gen. et sp. nov.	El-Sayed, Kora, Sallam, Claeson, Seiffert, & Antar
2017	Masrasector nananubis sp. nov.	Borths & Seiffert
2016	Brychotherium ephalmos gen. et sp. nov.	Borths, Holroyd, & Seiffert
2016	Akhnatenavus nefertiticyon sp. nov.	Borths, Holroyd, & Seiffert
2016	Aegyptonycteris knightae gen. et sp. nov.	Simmons, Seiffert, & Gunnell
2016	Renenutet enmerwer gen. et sp. nov.	McCartney & Seiffert
2014	Vintana sertichi gen. et sp. nov.	Krause, Hoffmann, Wible, Kirk, Schultz, von Koenigswald, Groenke, Rossie, O'Connor, Seiffert, Dumont, Holloway, Rogers, Rahantarisoa, Kemp, & Andriamialison
2013	Rukwapithecus fleaglei gen. et sp. nov.	Stevens, Seiffert, O'Connor, Roberts, Schmitz, Krause, Gorscak, Ngasala, Hieronymus, & Temu
2013	Nsungwepithecus gunnelli gen. et sp. nov.	Stevens, Seiffert, O'Connor, Roberts, Schmitz, Krause, Gorscak, Ngasala, Hieronymus, & Temu
2012	Acritophiomys bowni gen. et sp. nov.	Sallam, Seiffert, & Simons
2012	Omanitherium dhofarensis gen. et sp. nov.	Seiffert, Nasir, Al-Harthy, Groenke, Kraatz, Stevens, & Al-Sayigh
2010	Dimaitherium patnaiki gen. et sp. nov.	Barrow, Seiffert, & Simons
2010	Kabirmys qarunensis gen. et sp. nov.	Sallam, Seiffert, Simons, & Brindley
2010	Nosmips aenigmaticus gen. et sp. nov.	Seiffert, Simons, Boyer, Perry, Ryan, & Sallam
2010	Qatranilestes oligocaenus gen. et sp. nov.	Seiffert
2010	Dilambdogale gheerbranti gen. et sp. nov.	Seiffert
2009	Afradapis longicristatus gen. et sp. nov.	Seiffert, Perry, Simons, & Boyer
2003	Saharagalago misrensis gen. et sp. nov.	Seiffert, Simons, & Attia
2003	Karanisia clarki gen. et sp. nov.	Seiffert, Simons, & Attia
2001	Abuqatrania basiodontos gen. et sp. nov.	Simons, Seiffert, Chatrath, & Attia
