= Microhyrax =

Microhyrax Temporal range: Eocene 55.8–40.4 Ma

Scientific classification
- Kingdom: Animalia
- Phylum: Chordata
- Class: Mammalia
- Order: Hyracoidea
- Family: †Pliohyracidae
- Subfamily: †Saghatheriinae
- Genus: †Microhyrax; Sudre, 1979
- Species: †M. lavocati

Binomial name
- †Microhyrax lavocati Sudre, 1979

Extinct genus of mammals

Microhyrax is an extinct genus of herbivorous hyracoid mammal. It lived during the Eocene epoch from 55.8 to 40.4 million years ago in modern-day Algeria.

== Description ==
Diagnostic features of Microhyrax distinguishing it from its relatives included its maxillary molars possessing a weakly W-shaped ectoloph, swelling of the paraconule, and a diminutive mesostyle and parastyle. Microhyrax also had a progressively reduced metacone from its M^{1} to its M^{3}.

== Cladogram ==
A phylogeny of hyracoids known from the early Eocene through the middle Oligocene epoch.

- Eutheria
  - Afrotheria
    - Hyracoidea
      - Seggeurius
      - - Microhyrax
        - - Saghatheriinae (Note: Modern day hyrax species (Procaviidae) may have evolved from smaller members of one of the Saghatheriinae.)
            - Bunohyrax
            - - Pachyhyrax
              - - Thyrohyrax
                - - - - Selenohyrax
                      - Saghatherium
                    - - Titanohyrax
                      - Antilohyrax
                  - Megalohyrax
          - Geniohyiinae
            Geniohyus
    - Proboscidea (elephants)
  - Perissodactyla (Note: The relationship of hyracoids and Perissodactlya is controversial, and not supported by molecular data.)
  - Phenacodontidae
