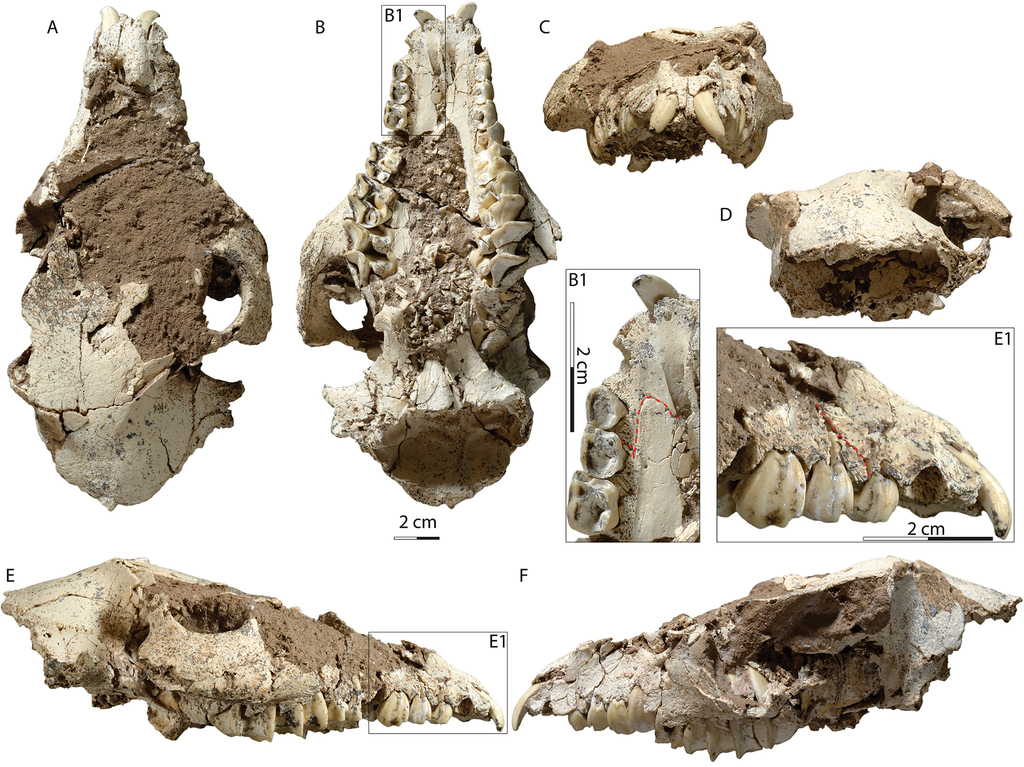
- The skull of Armenohyrax

Scientific classification
- Kingdom: Animalia
- Phylum: Chordata
- Class: Mammalia
- Order: Hyracoidea
- Family: †Pliohyracidae
- Genus: †Armenohyrax; Becker et al., 2026

Type species
- A. aznavouriani Becker et al., 2026

= Armenohyrax =

Armenohyrax Temporal range: late Pliocene 3.3 Ma

Extinct genus of mammals

Armenohyrax is an extinct genus of pliohyracid hyracoid from the late Pliocene of Armenia. Similar to other members of the family, Armenohyrax had a narrow snout with large, ever-growing first incisors. Though unlike other members, these teeth also point away from one another. Another notable feature of the hyrax is a lack of a canine tooth, a feature not seen in other members of the family. Phylogenic analyses place the genus as close to the genus Postschizotherium, a much more well known member of the family. The dentition of Armenohyrax is largely lophoselenodont, though the labial side of the dentition is also partly hypsodont. The genus is only known from a single species: A. aznavouriani.

== History and Naming ==
The holotype (JRD20/01) of Armenohyrax was collected from layer JZ-7 of the Jradzor locality, a late Pliocene-aged locality in Armenia. After collection of the specimen, Renaud Roch from the JURASSICA Museum, Switzerland prepared the material whereafter it was stored in the collections of the Institute of Geological Sciences, National Academy of Sciences of the Republic of Armenia, Yerevan, Armenia. The specimen was eventually described by Damien Becker and coauthors in 2026 within the Swiss Journal of Paleontology. Along with the description of the holotype, the paper also carried out the first phylogenic analysis of the family Pliohyracidae to confirm both suspected placements and monophyly of the group.

The generic name of Armenohyrax is a combination of "Armeno" in reference the country where the holotype was found, and "hyrax" which is an English word derived from ancient Greek that is a common suffix for naming members of Hyracoidea. The specific name "aznavouriani" is in memory of Charles Aznavourian who was a famous French-Armenian singer and songwriter. The songwriter was specifically chosen due to his cultural ties to both Armenia and Switzerland, with the scientists from both of those countries collaborating for the description of the genus.

== Description ==
The holotype of Armenohyrax is made up of a dorsoventrally flattened, largely complete skull with the entire upper dentition preserved. The specimen itself shows that the animal was a medium-sized member of the group. A deciduous premolar still being a part of the dentition shows that the individual was a subadult.

=== Skull ===
The skull of Armenohyrax is overall similar to other members of the family in having a narrow snout though it has a flat posterior portion of the frontals. The anterior most bone of the snout, the premaxilla, slopes slightly forwards at the tip. Two pairs of incisive foramina are found on the underside of the bone, with a pair being on each side of the midline palatal suture. The suture between this bone and the maxilla is located near the first premolar and is triangular, ending in between the second and third premolars. Like other closely-related members of the family like Postschizotherium, the orbits are placed relatively high on the skull. These orbits also extend slightly outwards, with this being most visible in dorsal view. A pair of holes, the infraorbital foramen, are positioned just about the fourth premolar. The bottom edge of the orbit is make up of the zygomatic arch which starts parallel to the first molar. Towards the end of the arch, it fused with the frontal bone, causing them to form a complete postorbital bar. The fronto-parietal crests are only slightly visible and come together right in front of the occipital crest.

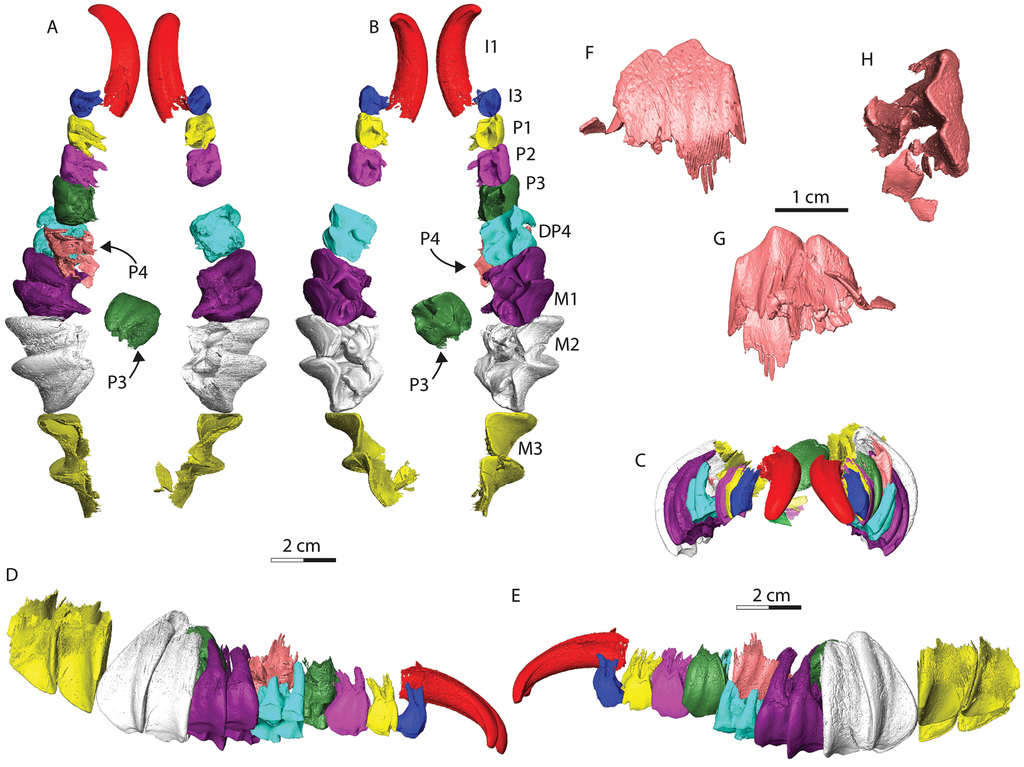
Views of the upper dentition of Armenohyrax

=== Dentition ===
The dentition of Armenohyrax differs from all other members of Pliohyracidae due to the lack of canines, resulting in a dental formula of 3 incisors (I1-3), 4 premolars (P1-4), and 3 molars (M1-3). Similar to other members of the family however, the incisors are large and have a diastema between the I1s. The I1s differ from the I1s of other pliohyracids due to them being ever-growing, recurved teeth that point away from the midline. There is also a diastema present between the I1 and I2. Unlike the I1, the I3s are premolariform and have two roots that are differently sized: with the root towards the tongue being split into two partially fused parts and much larger than the one closer to the cheek. The premolars of the animal are less molariform than other members of the family. Both the premolars and molars have trapezoidal surfaces that are wider than they are long. Between I3 and P3, the size and molarization of the teeth increase with the premolars. Even with this increase in size, the premolars are all much smaller than the molars. Due to the teeth being much larger, the molar series is much longer than the premolar series. Similar to the premolar series, there is an increase in size down the molar series. As a whole, the dentition of Armenohyrax is lophoselenodont and labially hypsodont. The M2 of the holotype lacks any sort of roots, unlike the M1, though this is most likely due to the young age of the individual rather than it being something seen in adult specimens. This tooth also shows a bunodont-like protocone and hypocone.

== Classification ==
The phylogenic analysis of Hyracoidea done by Becker and coauthors place the genus as a member of Pliohyracidae, with the closest relative of the genus being Postschizotherium. This is largely due to two shared features, these features being the position forward-most portion of the back border of the processus zygomaticus maxillari (zygomatic process of the maxilla) being in front of the third molar and the fact that the first incisors point away from one another. Both of these genera are found to be closely related to Pliohyrax along with the unstable and poorly-known taxon Hengduanshanhyrax. Though unstable, the authors suggest that the placement of Hengduanshanhyrax and Postschizotherium as sister genera lines up with both the ages and locations where the taxa are found. The phylogenic analysis done based on both scaled and unscaled analyses in the 2026 publication can be found below:

- - Moeritherium trigodon
  - - Hyracoidea
      - Seggeurius amourensis
      - - Thyrohyrax meyeri (scaled)
        - - Dimaitherium patnaiki
          - - Thyrohyrax meyeri (unscaled)
            - - - Megalohyrax "niloticus" (SMNS-P-12624)
                - Megalohyrax eocaenus
                - Saghatherium bowni
                - Thyrohyrax domorictus
                - Bunohyrax fajumensis
                - - Titanohyracidae
                    - Titanohyrax "sp.nov." (DPC 17876)
                    - Antilohyrax pectidens
                  - - Pliohyracidae
                      - Hengduanshanhyrax tibetensis (scaled)
                      - - Parapliohyrax mirabilis
                        - - Prohyrax hendeyi
                          - - Sogdohyrax soricus
                            - - Kvabebihyrax kachethicus
                              - - - Pliohyrax graecus (NMB SAM24)
                                  - Pliohyrax kruppii (SMNS 44302)
                                - - Armenohyrax aznavouriani
                                  - - - Postschizotherium intermedium (IVPP V6825/6826)
                                      - Hengduanshanhyrax tibetensis (unscaled)
                                    - - Postschizotherium cf. intermedium (TYFT030)
                - - Procaviidae
                    - Gigantohyrax maguirei
                    - - - Procavia capensis
                        - Heterohyrax brucei
                      - - Dendrohyrax dorsalis
                        - Dendrohyrax arboreus

== Paleoenvironment ==
The paleoenvironment of the Jradzor locality represents a number events starting with an avalanche of debris resulting from a volcanic eruption which took place at 4.3 my, forming a hill on top of a volcanic edifice. This formed a dammed lake that would slowly fill up between the next 3500 years, with the final stage of the lake being associated with ever more volcanic activity. This now empty lake was filled with more volcanic material in the forms of pyroclastic flows and ash-cloud surges. This continued volcanic activity largely took place between 4.3 and 3.93 ma. By the point when Armenohyrax appears at the site, 3.3 ma, there was much less volcanic activity than before with these animals instead being caught in lahars. During the late Pliocene, the Caucasus was covered in temperature forests and steppes depending on the elevation. An expansion of the steppe environments took place during this period of time as a result of more cool and arid climates in the region. This resulted in a region largely made up of forest steppes and pure steppes. Due to the Jradzor locality being a relatively new locality, first being described in 2023, not much of the large amounts of the material have been properly described. However, based on what is known from the horizon, Armenohyrax lived with a diverse assemblage of animals including multiple hyenas, the horse Hipparion, antelopes, and racoon dogs.
