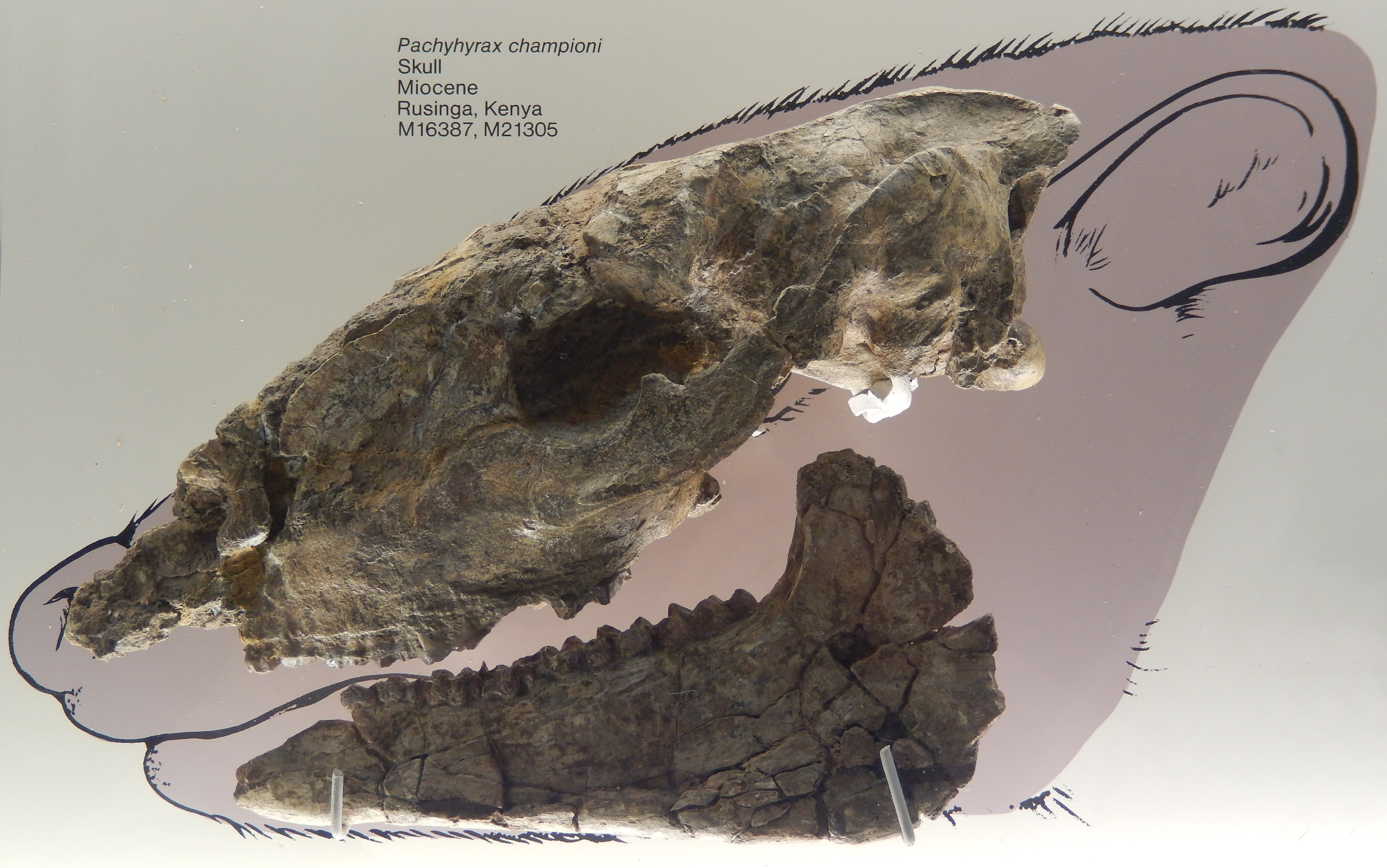
- Pachyhyrax championi, a large fossil hyrax from the Miocene of Rusinga, Kenya

Scientific classification
- Kingdom: Animalia
- Phylum: Chordata
- Class: Mammalia
- Grandorder: Paenungulata
- Order: Hyracoidea; Huxley, 1869

Subgroups
- †Pliohyracidae; Procaviidae; †Titanohyracidae; For extinct genera, see text

= Hyracoidea =

Hyracoidea Temporal range: Eocene–Recent

Order of mammals

Hyracoidea is a taxonomic order of mammals. It includes the living hyraxes, placed within the family Procaviidae, and several extinct taxa.

All modern hyraxes are members of the family Procaviidae (the only living family within Hyracoidea) and are found only in Africa and the Middle East. In the past, however, hyraxes were more diverse and widespread. At one site in Egypt, the order first appears in the fossil record in the form of Dimaitherium, 37 million years ago, but much older fossils exist elsewhere. For many millions of years, hyraxes, proboscideans, and other afrotherian mammals were the primary terrestrial herbivores in Africa, just as odd-toed ungulates were in North America.

Through the middle to late Eocene, many different species existed. The smallest of these were the size of a mouse but others were much larger than any extant relatives. Titanohyrax could reach 600 kg (1,300 lb) or even as much as over 1,300 kg (2,900 lb). Megalohyrax from the upper Eocene-lower Oligocene was as huge as a tapir. During the Miocene, however, competition from the newly developed bovids, which were very efficient grazers and browsers, displaced the hyraxes into marginal niches. Nevertheless, the order remained widespread and diverse as late as the end of the Pliocene (about two million years ago) with representatives throughout most of Africa, Europe, and Asia.

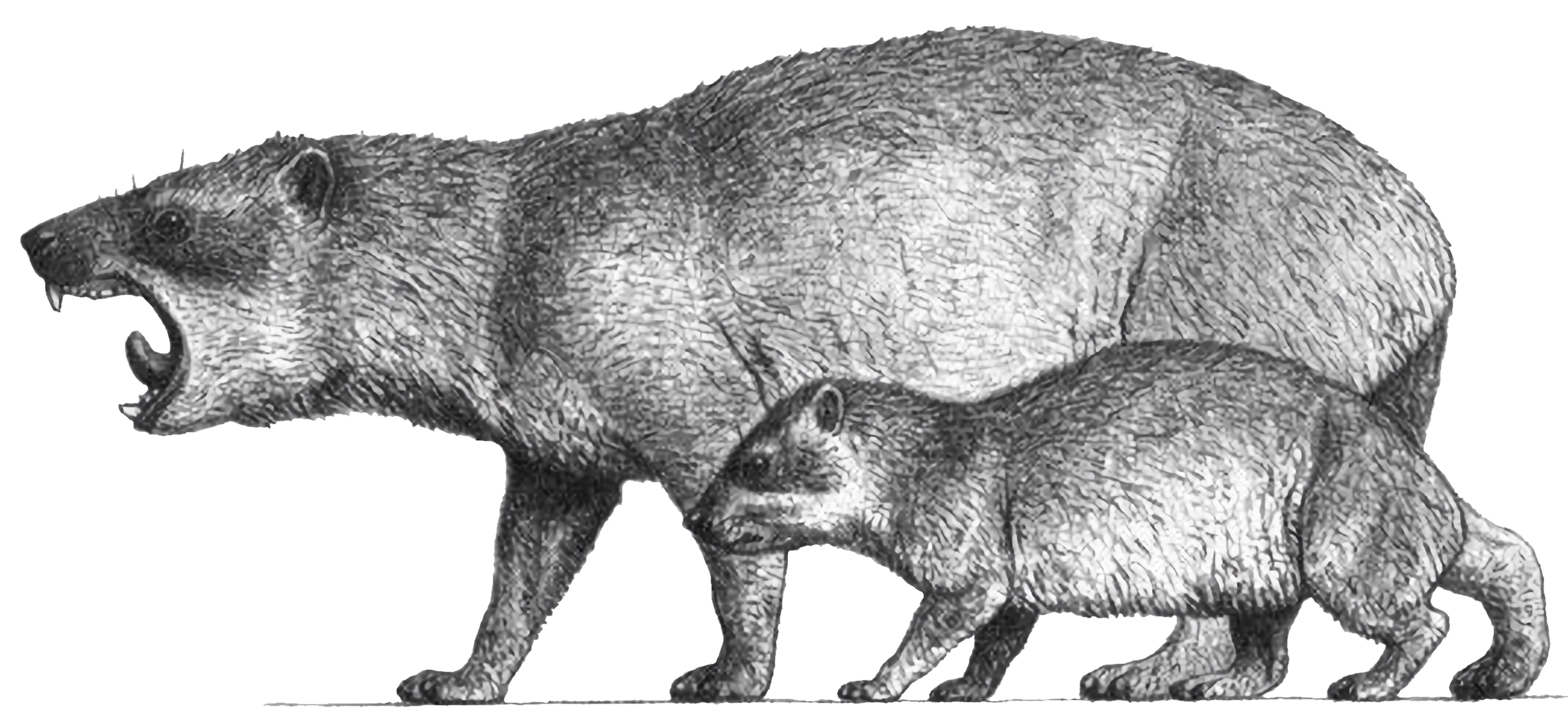
Restoration of the large, prehistoric Prohyrax next to a modern hyrax

The descendants of the giant "hyracoids" (common ancestors to the hyraxes, elephants, and sirenians) evolved in different ways. Some became smaller, and evolved to become the modern hyrax family. Others appear to have taken to the water (perhaps like the modern capybara), ultimately giving rise to the elephant family and perhaps also the sirenians. DNA evidence supports this hypothesis, and the small modern hyraxes share numerous features with elephants, such as toenails, excellent hearing, sensitive pads on their feet, small tusks, good memory, higher brain functions compared with other similar mammals, and the shape of some of their bones.

Hyraxes are sometimes described as being the closest living relative of the elephant, although this is disputed. Recent morphological- and molecular-based classifications reveal the sirenians to be the closest living relatives of elephants. While hyraxes are closely related, they form a taxonomic outgroup to the assemblage of elephants, sirenians, and the extinct orders Embrithopoda and Desmostylia.

The extinct meridiungulate family Archaeohyracidae, consisting of seven genera of notoungulate mammals known from the Paleocene through the Oligocene of South America, is a group unrelated to the true hyraxes.

== List of genera ==
Phylogeny of early hyracoids

- Eutheria
  - - - Perissodactyla (Note: The relationship of hyracoids and perissodactyls is controversial, and not supported by molecular data.)
        (horses, asses, and zebras; rhinos; and tapirs)
    - - †Phenacodontidae (Note: The position of the phenacodontids has been long unresolved; some authorities suspect that they are basal members of the perissodactyls, but that placement is contested.)
  - Afrotheria
    - Proboscidea
      (elephants, mammoths, and mastodons)
    - Hyracoidea
      - †Seggeurius
      - - †Microhyrax
        - - Geniohyiinae
            †Geniohyus
          - †Saghatheriinae (Note: Modern-day hyrax species (Procaviidae) may have evolved from smaller members of one of the Saghatheriinae.)
            - †Bunohyrax
            - - †Pachyhyrax
              - - †Thyrohyrax
                - - †Megalohyrax
                  - - - †Antilohyrax
                      - †Titanohyrax
                    - - †Saghatherium
                      - †Selenohyrax

A phylogeny of hyracoids known from the early Eocene through the middle Oligocene epoch.

Hyracoidea

- †Dimaitherium
- †Helioseus?
- †Microhyrax
- †Seggeurius
- †Geniohyidae
  - †Abdahyrax
  - †Brachyhyrax
  - †Bunohyrax
  - †Geniohyus
  - †Namahyrax
  - †Nengohyrax
  - †Pachyhyrax
- †"Saghatheriidae" (Polyphyletic)
  - †Megalohyrax
  - †Regubahyrax
  - †Rukwalorax
  - †Saghatherium
  - †Selenohyrax
  - †Thyrohyrax
- †Titanohyracidae
  - †Afrohyrax
  - †Antilohyrax
  - †Rupestrohyrax
  - †Titanohyrax
- †Pliohyracidae
  - †Armenohyrax
  - †Hengduanshanhyrax
  - †Kvabebihyrax
  - †Meroehyrax
  - †Parapliohyrax
  - †Pliohyrax
  - †Postschizotherium
  - †Prohyrax
- Procaviidae
  - Dendrohyrax (Tree hyrax)
  - †Gigantohyrax
  - Heterohyrax (Bush hyrax)
  - Procavia (Rock hyrax)
