= Widan el Faras Basalt =

Geological formation in Faiyum Governorate, Egypt

- Stratigraphic range: Oligocene
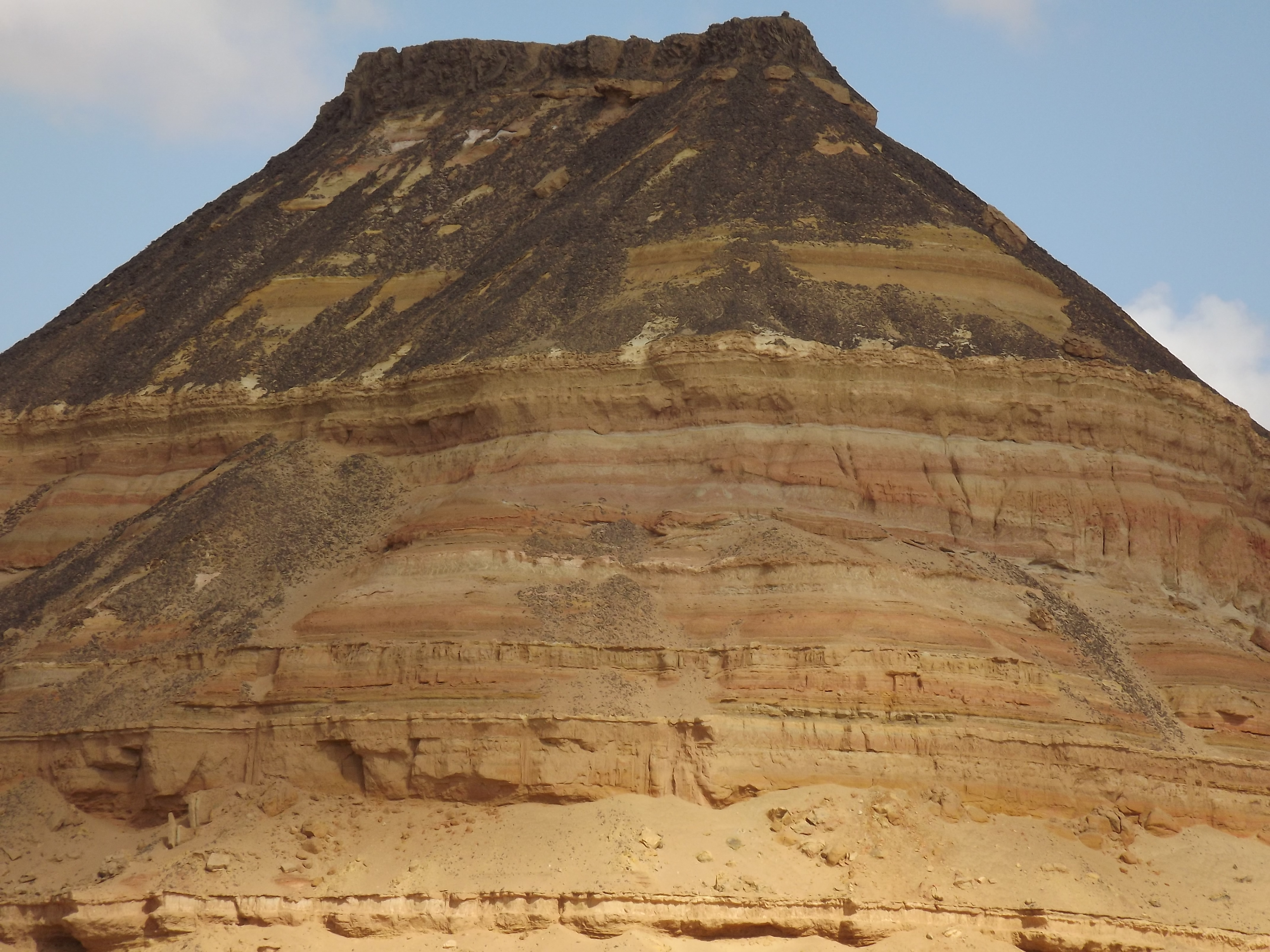
- Widan el-Faras in the northern Fayum area, the uppermost layer is formed by the Widan el-Faras basalt
- Type: Formation
- Overlies: Jebel Qatrani Formation
- Area: Fayum Depression
- Thickness: 20 m

Lithology
- Primary: Basalt

Location
- Region: Faiyum Governorate
- Country: Egypt

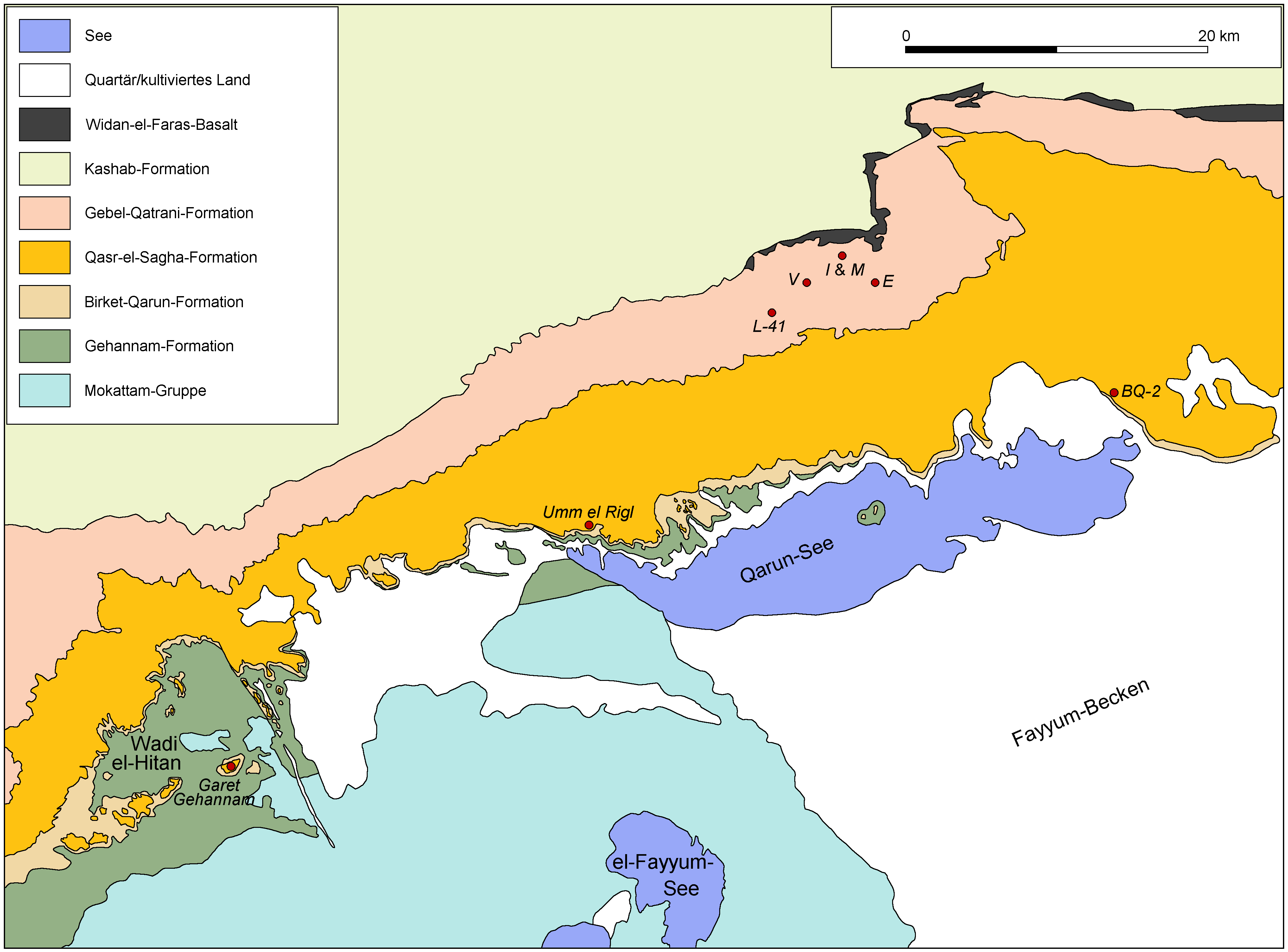
Geology of the northern and northwestern Fayum area

Widan el Faras Basalt, literarily "Ears of the Mare" - named for its twin peaks, is a geological formation containing quarries located in northern Egypt north of Birket Qarun lake near the Faiyum Oasis. It straddles both the Giza Governorate and Faiyum Governorate. It is a dark, iron-rich extrusive basalt.

== Geology ==
Widan el Faras Basalt is located at the top of the eastern extremity of Jebel el Qatrani at about 340 metres above the sea, forming two conical black basalt-capped cliff-outliers, standing side by side. It overlies the Jebel Qatrani Formation and in some places it is overlain by the Miocene alluvial Kashab Formation. Its basaltic sheets vary in thickness from 2 to 25 m. The formation is due to basaltic lavas extruded by volcanic activity in northern Egypt in early Oligocene.

== History ==
The quarries were primary used for paving mortuary temples floors in some of the Fourth and Fifth Dynasty of Egypt pyramid complexes some 4.500 years ago. Basalt blocks were taken from the quarries and collected for overland transport along an eleven kilometres long paved roadway to the Faiyum Depression, terminating at a quay in Qasr el-Sagha by the ancient north-eastern shore of Lake Moeris. The roadway is recognized as the oldest surviving paved road in the world. From shore of Lake Moeris the basalt blocks were transported largely via water to the pyramid construction sites. The roadway was constructed of basalt stone and petrified wood. Widen el-Faras continues to be a site for modern quarrying.

== See also ==
- Widanelfarasia
- Geologic formations of Egypt
