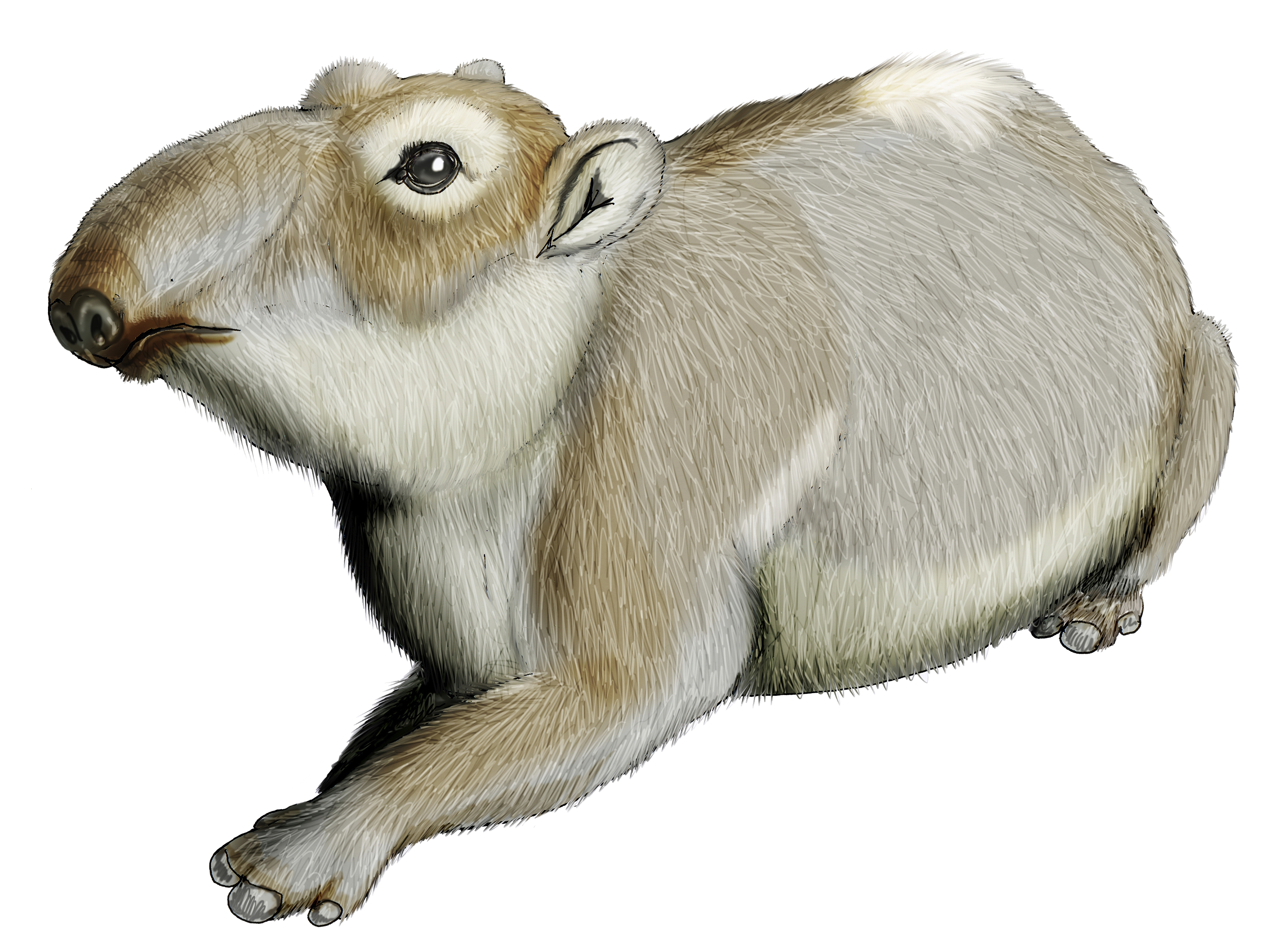
- Artist's reconstruction

Scientific classification
- Domain: Eukaryota
- Kingdom: Animalia
- Phylum: Chordata
- Class: Mammalia
- Order: Hyracoidea
- Family: †Pliohyracidae
- Subfamily: †Pliohyracinae
- Genus: †Kvabebihyrax; Gabunia & Vekua, 1966
- Species: †K. kachethicus

Binomial name
- †Kvabebihyrax kachethicus Gabunia & Vekua, 1966

= Kvabebihyrax =

Kvabebihyrax Temporal range: Late Pliocene

Extinct mammal

Kvabebihyrax kachethicus is an extinct hyrax from the Pliocene that lived in the Caucasus region.

With a length of 1.6 metres (5 ft 4 in), Kvabebihyrax was much larger than modern hyraxes, comparable in size to larger species of the Paleogene genus Titanohyrax. Its robust body and eyes placed high on the skull gave it a hippopotamus-like appearance. It also had large pairs of incisors in both jaws.
