= Aframonius =

Aframonius Temporal range: Late Eocene

Scientific classification
- Domain: Eukaryota
- Kingdom: Animalia
- Phylum: Chordata
- Class: Mammalia
- Order: Primates
- Suborder: Strepsirrhini
- Family: †Adapidae
- Genus: †Aframonius; Simons et al., 1995
- Species: †A. diedes

Binomial name
- †Aframonius diedes Simons et al., 1995

Extinct genus of primates

Aframonius is a genus of adapiform primate that lived in Africa during the late Eocene or early Oligocene. Fossils of the genus were found in the Jebel Qatrani Formation of Egypt.
