= Rupestrohyrax =

Rupestrohyrax Temporal range: Bartonian

Scientific classification
- Kingdom: Animalia
- Phylum: Chordata
- Class: Mammalia
- Order: Hyracoidea
- Family: †Titanohyracidae
- Genus: †Rupestrohyrax
- Species: †R. palustris

Binomial name
- †Rupestrohyrax palustris Pickford, 2015

Extinct genus of mammals

Rupestrohyrax is an extinct genus of titanohyracid that lived during the Bartonian stage of the Eocene epoch.

== Distribution ==
Rupestohyrax palustris is known from the Eoridge Limestone of Namibia.
