= Afradapis =

Afradapis Temporal range: Priabonian

Scientific classification
- Kingdom: Animalia
- Phylum: Chordata
- Class: Mammalia
- Order: Primates
- Suborder: Strepsirrhini
- Family: †Adapidae
- Genus: †Afradapis; Seiffert et al., 2009
- Species: †A. longicristatus

Binomial name
- †Afradapis longicristatus Seiffert et al., 2009

Extinct genus of primates

Afradapis is a genus of adapiform primate that lived during the Late Eocene. The only known species, Afradapis longicristatus, was discovered in the Birket Qarun Formation in northern Egypt in 2009. While its geographic distribution is confined to Afro-Arabia, Afradapis belongs to the predominantly European adapiform family Caenopithecinae. This taxonomic placement is supported by recent phylogenetic analyses that recover a close evolutionary relationship between Afradapis and adapiforms, including Darwinius. While adapiforms have been noted for their strepsirrhine-like morphology, no adapiform fossil possesses the unique anatomical traits (i.e., synapomorphies) to establish an ancestor-descent relationship between caenopithecids and living strepsirrhines (i.e., lemurs, lorises, and galagos). It ate leaves and moved around slowly like lorises.

== Etymology ==
Afra- (Latin) means “Africa” while -adapis refers to Adapis, as described by Cuvier, 1821. Longi- (Latin) means “long” and -cristatus (Latin) means “crested”.

== Taxonomy ==
Based on the combination of lemur-like dental and postcranial anatomy, Afradapis is recognized as an adapiform. The holotype specimen representing Afradapis longicristatus (CGM 83690) consists of a partial left mandible that preserves P4–M3 and the masseteric fossa. Afradapis is characterized by a suite of adapiform and anthropoid-like dental features. Despite possessing multiple anthropoid traits, phylogenetic analyses have recovered Afradapis as a distant relative of anthropoids; thus, the anthropoid-like traits are the product convergent evolution. Afradapis belongs to the subfamily Caenopithecidae, which also includes Cernopithecus, Aframonius, and Masradapis. However, the exact relationships among these extinct taxa are still under debate. Despite similar naming, Afradapis is more closely related to Ceanopithecus than Aframonius, on account of the more derived 2.1.2.3 dental formula, which an anthropoid-like trait. These broader evolutionary relationships reveals an interesting biogepgrpahic history for caenopithecid adapiforms, as the timing and placement of Afrapids in northern Africa indicates at least one dispersal event from Europe to Africa across the Tethys Sea as early as 56 million years ago, at the end of the Paleocene.

== Description ==
Estimates of adult weight for Afradapis range from 2.1kg to 3.3kg. These estimates have been derived from prosimian-specific regression questions, which calculate body mass based on the area of M1 area and length M2. Compared to other caenopithecids, Afradapis evolutionarily lost P2, resulting in a 2.1.2.3 lower dental formula. Afradapis possesses an astragalus with a strongly sloping fibular facet that resembles those of extant lorises. This morphology has been attributed to slow-climbing arboreal locomotion seen in living lorises. Afradapis also differs from other caenopithecid adapiforms in their dental anatomy in the following ways: possession of tall and trenchant upper and lower third premolars, a variably present mesoconid on lower molars (usually on M1), a lack of metastylids on M1-3, and large hypocones and prehypocristae present on all upper molars.

The mandible of Afradapis differs from other caenopithecid adapiforms in having a deep yet short corpus, a well-developed masseteric fossa, a fused manibudlar symphysis, and a short condylar neck with a low condyle relative to the lower tooth row. Based on the known fossils of this taxon, there is no evidence of canine dimorphism in Afradapis, which suggests that Afradapis was not sexually dimorphic like some North American adapiforms. Afradpais is also characterized by elaborate shearing crests on its molars, which is indicative of a folivorous diet. Because Afradapis seemingly shares many traits with anthropoids, researchers initially considered it to possibly be an anthropoid during initial investigations. Nonetheless, these similarities appear to be cases of convergent evolution, confirmed by both phylogeny and niche modeling.

== Biogeography ==
Afradapis is considered to have existed throughout Afro-Arabia in the late Eocene after a dispersal from the Europe via the Tethys Sea.

== Palaeobiology ==
=== Diet ===
Collectively, its elaborate shearing crests, relatively large body size, and postcranial anatomy indicative of slow-climbing all strongly suggests that Afradapis was nearly exclusively folivorous. Given Kay’s Threshold, which posits that living primates over 500 grams tend to be folivores, the dietary behavior and body size estimates of Afradapis collectively support the reconstruction of Afradpis as relatively large bodied folivore.

=== Activity pattern ===
Niche modeling studies also reveal that Afradapis was most likely diurnal that probably competed for food resources with African anthropoids.

=== Locomotion ===
The astragalar morphology of Afradapis longicristatus is similar to that of modern lorises, suggesting that it used a similar locomotory style of slow, cautious movement involving hindlimb suspension and strong pedal grasping. It is likely that this method of locomotion was an adaptation for stealth that made the animal difficult to detect by predators.
