= Masradapis =

Masradapis Temporal range: Priabonian ~38 Ma

Scientific classification
- Domain: Eukaryota
- Kingdom: Animalia
- Phylum: Chordata
- Class: Mammalia
- Order: Primates
- Suborder: Strepsirrhini
- Family: †Adapidae
- Subfamily: †Caenopithecinae
- Genus: †Masradapis; Seiffert et al. 2017
- Species: †M. tahai

Binomial name
- †Masradapis tahai Seiffert et al. 2017

Extinct genus of primates

Masradapis is an extinct genus of caenopithecine primate from the Priabonian Birket Qarun Formation of the Fayum Depression, Egypt. The type and only species, Masradapis tahai, was named and described by Erik R. Seiffert et al., in 2017. Bayesian tip-dating, when combined with Bayesian biogeographic analysis, suggests that a common ancestor of known caenopithecines dispersed to Afro-Arabia from Europe between 49.4 and 47.4 Ma, and that a trans-Tethyan back-dispersal explains Caenopithecus’ later presence in Europe.
