= Widanelfarasia =

Widanelfarasia Temporal range: 37.2 Ma Late Eocene

Scientific classification
- Kingdom: Animalia
- Phylum: Chordata
- Class: Mammalia
- Order: Afrosoricida
- Genus: †Widanelfarasia; Seiffert & Simons, 2000

Type species
- Widanelfarasia bowni Seiffert & Simons, 2000

Species
- W. bowni; W. rasmusseni

Extinct genus of mammals

Widanelfarasia is an extinct genus of placental mammals known from the Late Eocene Jebel Qatrani Formation of Egypt. Two species are known: W. bowni and the smaller W. rasmusseni. Described in 2000 by E. R. Seiffert and Elwyn L. Simons, Widanelfarasia was initially classified as uncertain position (incertae sedis) within placentals, but was later placed within the afrosoricidan suborder Tenrecomorpha (tenrecs and otter shrews). The genus name derives from Widan el-Faras (Arabic for "Ears of the Mare"), two prominent hills in the area where the fossils were recovered.
