= Phiocricetomys =

Phiocricetomys Temporal range: Early Oligocene

Scientific classification
- Domain: Eukaryota
- Kingdom: Animalia
- Phylum: Chordata
- Class: Mammalia
- Order: Rodentia
- Family: †Myophiomyidae
- Subfamily: †Phiocricetomyinae; Lavocat, 1973
- Genus: †Phiocricetomys; Wood, 1968

Extinct genus of rodents

Phiocricetomys is an extinct genus of rodent from Africa. It is the only genus in the subfamily Phiocricetomyinae.
