= Rukwalorax =

Rukwalorax Temporal range: Oligocene

Scientific classification
- Domain: Eukaryota
- Kingdom: Animalia
- Phylum: Chordata
- Class: Mammalia
- Order: Hyracoidea
- Genus: †Rukwalorax; Stevens et al., 2009
- Species: †R. jinokitana

Binomial name
- †Rukwalorax jinokitana Stevens et al., 2009

Extinct genus of mammals

Rukwalorax is an extinct genus of hyrax that inhabited Africa during the Oligocene epoch. It is a monotypic genus that contains the single species Rukwalorax jinokitana.

== Distribution ==
Fossils of Rukwalorax jinokitana are known from the Songwe Member of the Nsungwe Formation of Tanzania, which dates to the Late Oligocene.
