= Nengohyrax =

Nengohyrax Temporal range: Oligocene

Scientific classification
- Kingdom: Animalia
- Phylum: Chordata
- Class: Mammalia
- Infraclass: Placentalia
- Order: Hyracoidea
- Family: †Geniohyidae
- Genus: †Nengohyrax
- Species: †N. josephi

Binomial name
- †Nengohyrax josephi Vitek et al., 2024

Extinct genus of hyracoid

Nengohyrax is an extinct genus of hyracoid known to have inhabited Kenya during the Oligocene epoch. It is a monotypic genus containing the species N. josephi.
