= Abdahyrax =

Abdahyrax Temporal range: Oligocene

Scientific classification
- Kingdom: Animalia
- Phylum: Chordata
- Class: Mammalia
- Infraclass: Placentalia
- Order: Hyracoidea
- Family: †Geniohyidae
- Genus: †Abdahyrax
- Species: †A. philipi

Binomial name
- †Abdahyrax philipi Vitek et al., 2024

Extinct genus of hyracoid

Abdahyrax is an extinct genus of hyracoid known from the Oligocene of Kenya. It is a monotypic genus containing the species A. philipi.
