= Gigantohyrax =

Gigantohyrax Temporal range: Late Pliocene 3.6–2.6 Ma

Scientific classification
- Kingdom: Animalia
- Phylum: Chordata
- Class: Mammalia
- Infraclass: Placentalia
- Order: Hyracoidea
- Family: Procaviidae
- Genus: †Gigantohyrax; Kitching, 1965
- Species: †G. maguirei

Binomial name
- †Gigantohyrax maguirei Kitching, 1965

Extinct genus of hyrax

Gigantohyrax was a genus of herbivorous hyrax-grouped mammals from the Pliocene Shungura Formation of Ethiopia. Fossils have also been found in Makapansgat of South Africa.

== Description ==
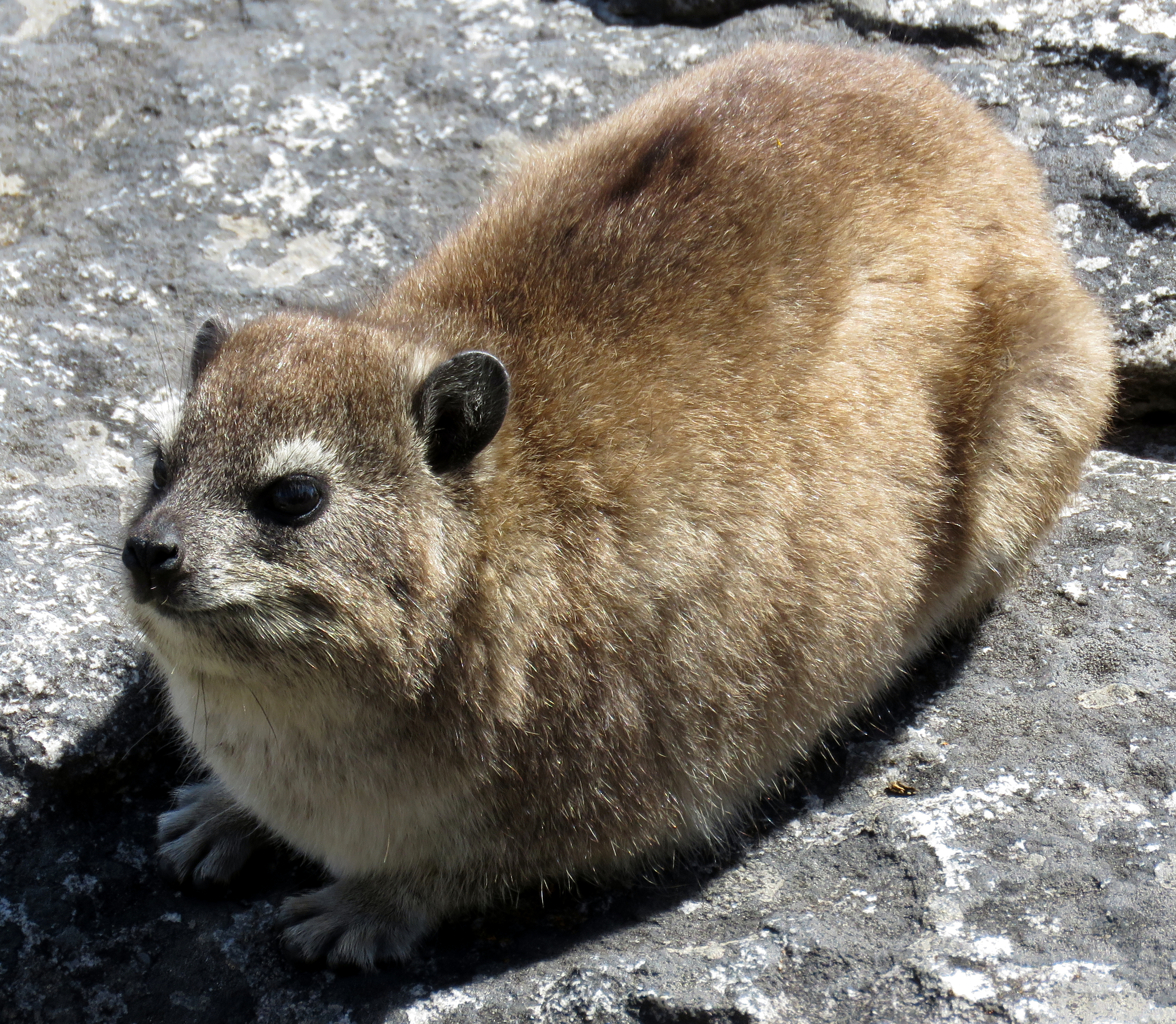
Rock Hyrax (Procavia capensis), a living relative of Gigantohyrax

Gigantohyrax maguirei is the type and only species. Holotype BPI M8230 is two thirds of an anterior part of the skull with complete upper dentition. The second and third incisors are lost, making it more similar to latest hyraxes than the earlier species. Despite its name, Gigantohyrax did not reach such gigantic sizes as Megalohyrax and Titanohyrax from the Early Tertiary, although it was three times as large as the extant Procavia capensis from the same family.

It has many features in common with the extant Dendrohyrax, although Gigantohyrax has less difference between the parameters of the molars and premolars.

== See also ==
- Largest prehistoric animals
