= Selenohyrax =

Scientific classification
- Domain: Eukaryota
- Kingdom: Animalia
- Phylum: Chordata
- Class: Mammalia
- Order: Hyracoidea
- Family: †Pliohyracidae
- Genus: †Selenohyrax; Rasmussen & Simons, 1988
- Species: †S. chatrathi

Binomial name
- †Selenohyrax chatrathi Rasmussen & Simons, 1988

Extinct genus of mammals

Selenohyrax was a genus of herbivorous hyrax-grouped mammal.
