= Antilohyrax =

Antilohyrax Temporal range: Eocene

Scientific classification
- Kingdom: Animalia
- Phylum: Chordata
- Class: Mammalia
- Order: Hyracoidea
- Family: †Titanohyracidae
- Genus: †Antilohyrax; Rasmussen and Simons, 2000
- Species: †A. pectidens

Binomial name
- †Antilohyrax pectidens Rasmussen and Simons, 2000

Antilohyrax is an extinct genus of herbivorous mammal belonging to the order Hyracoidea. Fossils were found in 1983 in Egypt, 46 m above the bottom of the Jebel Qatrani Formation.

== Description ==
The species Antilohyrax pectidens had an approximate weight of 33–35 kg. It had features not seen in other hyraxes, including a "broad hyper-pectinate comb-like first incisor" on its lower jaw, selenodont molars and a rostrum similar to that seen in even-toed ungulates. The A. pectidens Schmelzmuster consisted of a single layer of radial enamel, while a very thin layer of prismless external enamel existed on the exterior of its teeth.
