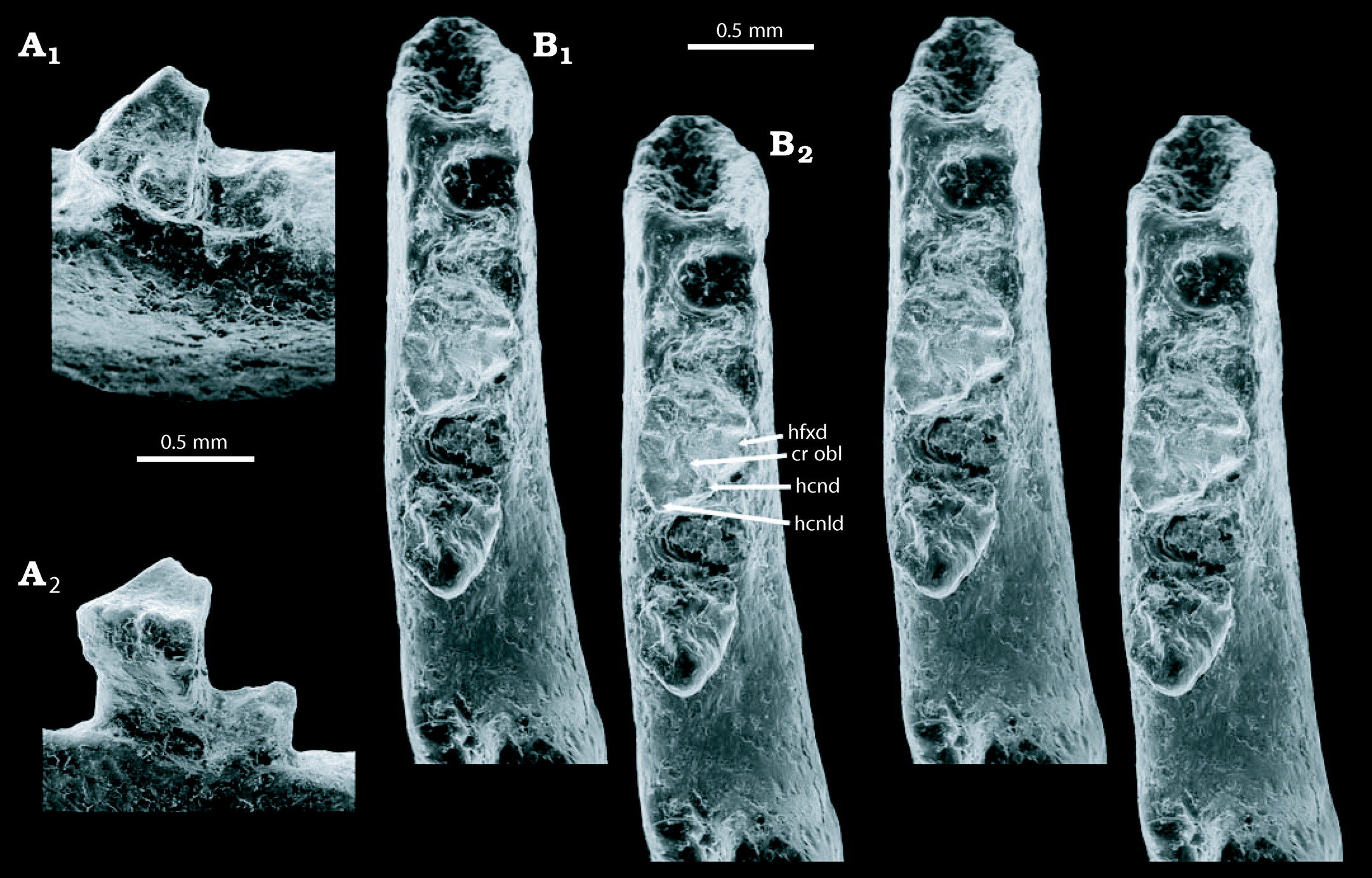
- Qatranilestes oligocaenus

Scientific classification
- Kingdom: Animalia
- Phylum: Chordata
- Class: Mammalia
- Order: Tenrecoidea
- Genus: †Qatranilestes; Erik R. Seiffert, 2010

Species
- Q. oligocaenus Erik R. Seiffert, 2010 (type)

= Qatranilestes =

Qatranilestes Temporal range: 30 Ma Early Oligocene

Qatranilestes is an extinct genus of afrosoricid which existed in Fayum, Egypt during the earliest Oligocene period (Rupelian age). It was first named by Erik R. Seiffert in 2010 and the type species is Qatranilestes oligocaenus. As of 2010, Qatranilestes was the youngest known afrosoricid fossil from Egypt.
