= Qatranimys =

Qatranimys Temporal range: Priabonian

Scientific classification
- Kingdom: Animalia
- Phylum: Chordata
- Class: Mammalia
- Infraclass: Placentalia
- Order: Rodentia
- Family: †Myophiomyidae
- Genus: †Qatranimys; Al-Ashqar et al., 2021
- Species: †Q. safroutus

Binomial name
- †Qatranimys safroutus Al-Ashqar et al., 2021

Extinct genus of rodents

Qatranimys is an extinct genus of phiocricetomyine rodent that inhabited Egypt during the Priabonian stage of the Eocene epoch. It is a monotypic genus containing the species Q. safroutus.
