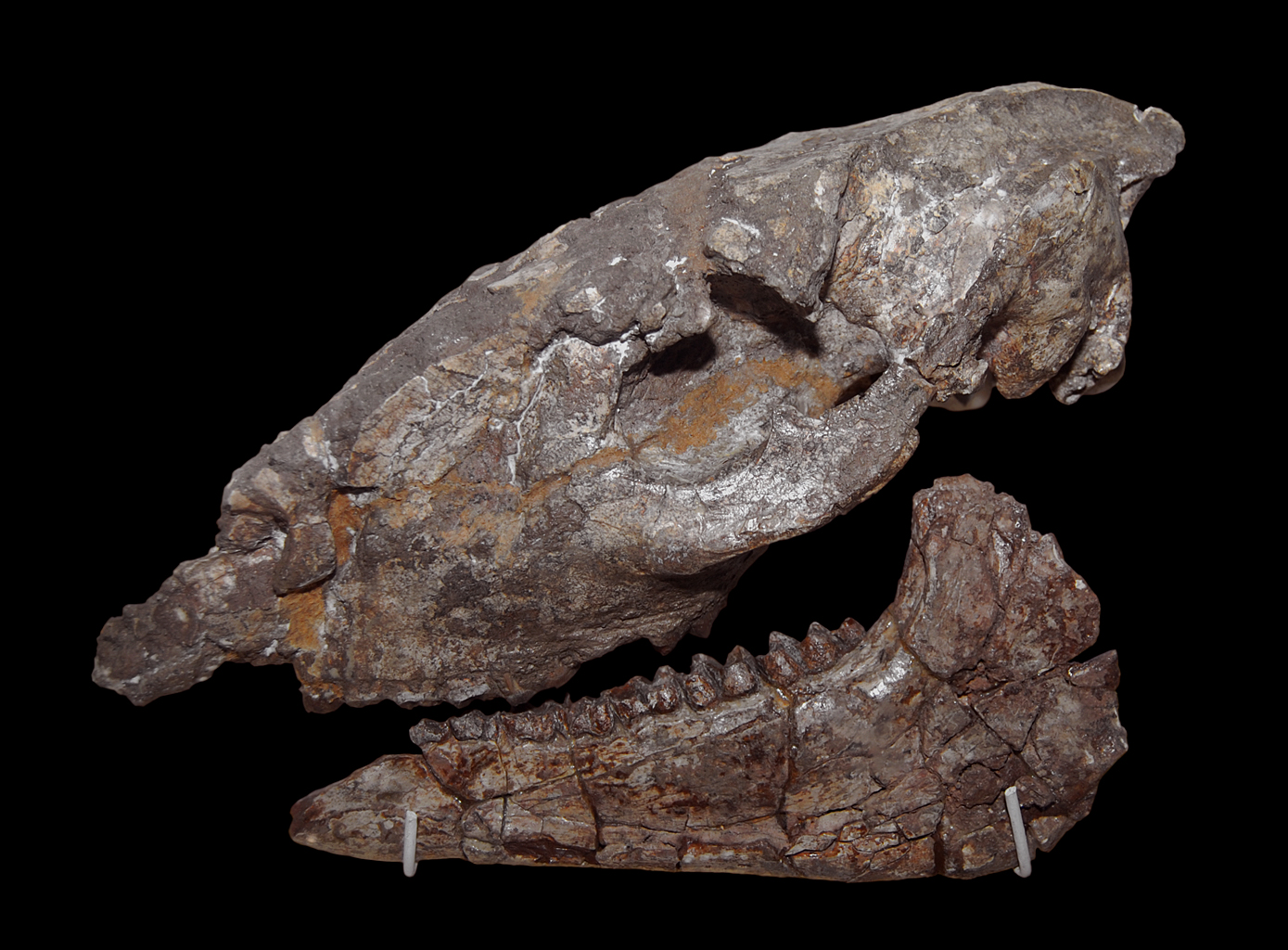
- Pachyhyrax championi skull, Natural History Museum, London

Scientific classification
- Kingdom: Animalia
- Phylum: Chordata
- Class: Mammalia
- Order: Hyracoidea
- Family: †Pliohyracidae
- Genus: †Pachyhyrax Schlosser, 1910
- Species: P. crassidentatus

Binomial name
- Pachyhyrax crassidentatus Schlosser, 1910

= Pachyhyrax =

Pachyhyrax Temporal range: Oligocene

Extinct genus of mammals

Pachyhyrax was a genus of herbivorous hyrax-grouped mammal belonging to the clade Paenungulata.
