= Acritophiomys =

Acritophiomys Temporal range: Late Eocene

Scientific classification
- Kingdom: Animalia
- Phylum: Chordata
- Class: Mammalia
- Infraclass: Placentalia
- Order: Rodentia
- Parvorder: Phiomorpha
- Genus: †Acritophiomys
- Species: †A. bowni

Binomial name
- †Acritophiomys bowni Sallam et al., 2012

Extinct genus of rodents

Acritophiomys is an extinct genus of phiomorph rodent that inhabited Egypt during the Late Eocene. It contains a single species, A. bowni.
