= Seggeurius =

Scientific classification
- Kingdom: Animalia
- Phylum: Chordata
- Class: Mammalia
- Order: Hyracoidea
- Family: †Pliohyracidae
- Subfamily: †Geniohyinae
- Genus: †Seggeurius; Mahboubi, Ameur, Crochet & Jaeger, 1986

Extinct genus of mammals

Seggeurius was a genus of herbivorous hyrax-grouped mammal.
