= Dimaitherium =

Dimaitherium Temporal range: Priabonian, Late Eocene

Scientific classification
- Kingdom: Animalia
- Phylum: Chordata
- Class: Mammalia
- Infraclass: Placentalia
- Grandorder: Paenungulata
- Order: Hyracoidea
- Genus: †Dimaitherium; Barrow et al., 2010
- Species: †D. patnaiki

Binomial name
- †Dimaitherium patnaiki Barrow et al., 2010

Extinct genus of mammals

Dimaitherium is an extinct hyracoid which existed in what is now Egypt, during the late Eocene period. It was first named by Eugenie Barrow, Erik R. Seiffert, and Elwyn L. Simons in 2010. The type species is Dimaitherium patnaiki.
