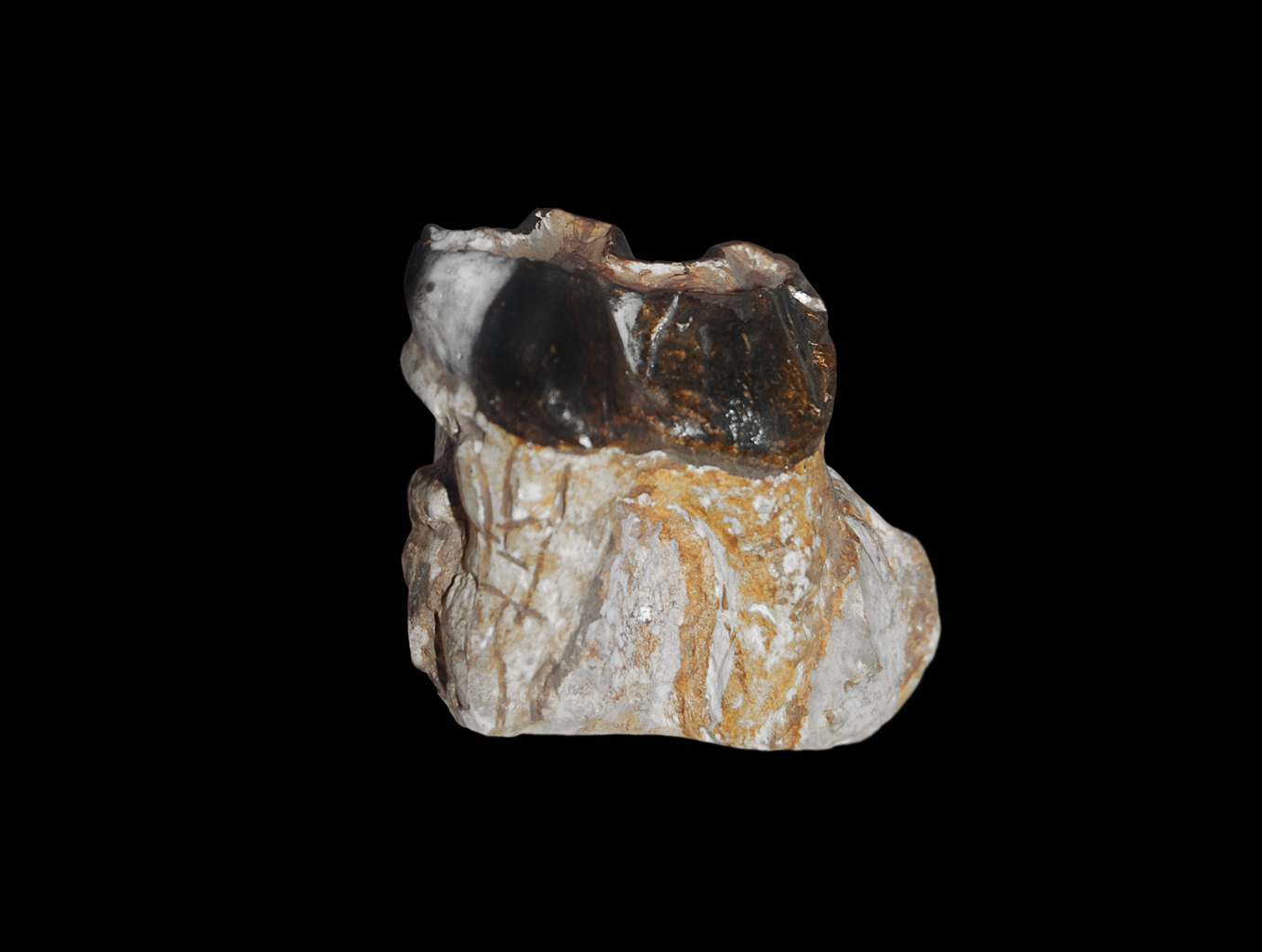
- Teeth

Scientific classification
- Kingdom: Animalia
- Phylum: Chordata
- Class: Mammalia
- Order: Hyracoidea
- Family: †Titanohyracidae
- Genus: †Titanohyrax; Matsumoto, 1922

Type species
- Titanohyrax andrewsi

Species
- †T. andrewsi Matsumoto, 1922; †T. angustidens Rasmussen and Simons, 1988; †T. mongereaui Sudre, 1979; †T. tantalus Court and Hartenberger, 1992; †T. palaeotherioides (Schlosser, 1911); †T. ultimus Matsumoto 1922

= Titanohyrax =

Titanohyrax Temporal range: Early Eocene–Early Oligocene

Extinct genus of mammals

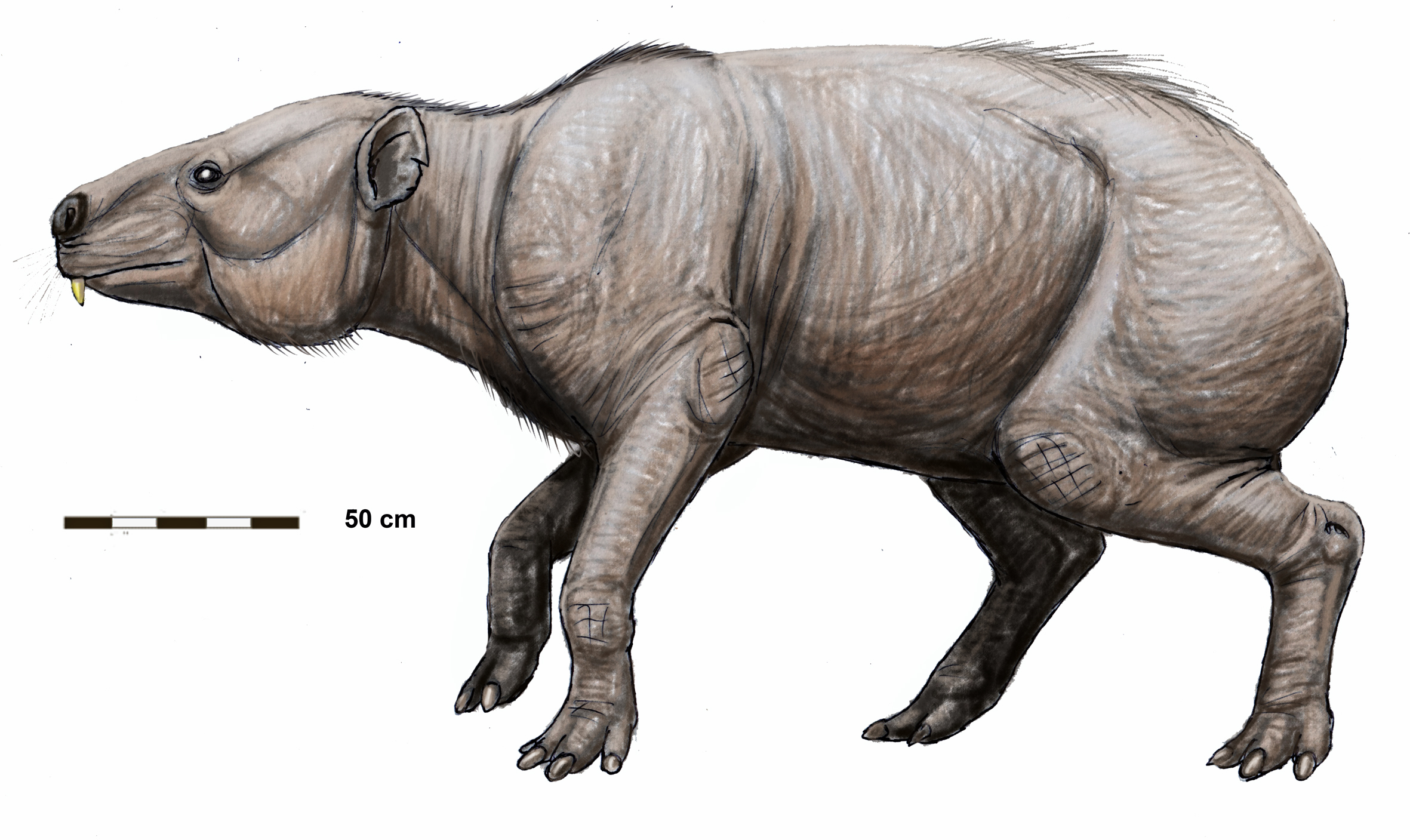
Restoration

Titanohyrax is an extinct genus of large to very large hyrax from the Eocene and Oligocene. Specimens have been discovered in modern-day Algeria, Tunisia, Egypt and Libya. Some species, like T. ultimus, are estimated to be as large as the modern rhinoceros. Titanohyrax species are still poorly known due to their rarity in the fossil record.

Titanohyrax is unusual among the numerous Paleogene hyracoids by its lophoselenodont teeth (having teeth that are lophodont and selenodont), fully molariform premolars, and relatively high-crowned cheek teeth. This suggests the genus had a folivorous diet.

The genus was first described by in 1922 for the species T. ultimus from the early Oligocene of the Jebel Qatrani Formation, Fayum Depression, Egypt. The author described it as an “extremely gigantic species, being the largest of all the hyracoids hitherto known” – estimates of body mass range from 600 kg (1,300 lb) to 1,300 kg (2,900 lb). T. tantulus is the smallest Titanohyrax species known, with a body mass of around 23 kg (51 lb).

== See also ==
- Megalohyrax
- Gigantohyrax
- Largest prehistoric animals

== Sources ==
- Fossils (Smithsonian Handbooks) by David Ward (Page 277)
