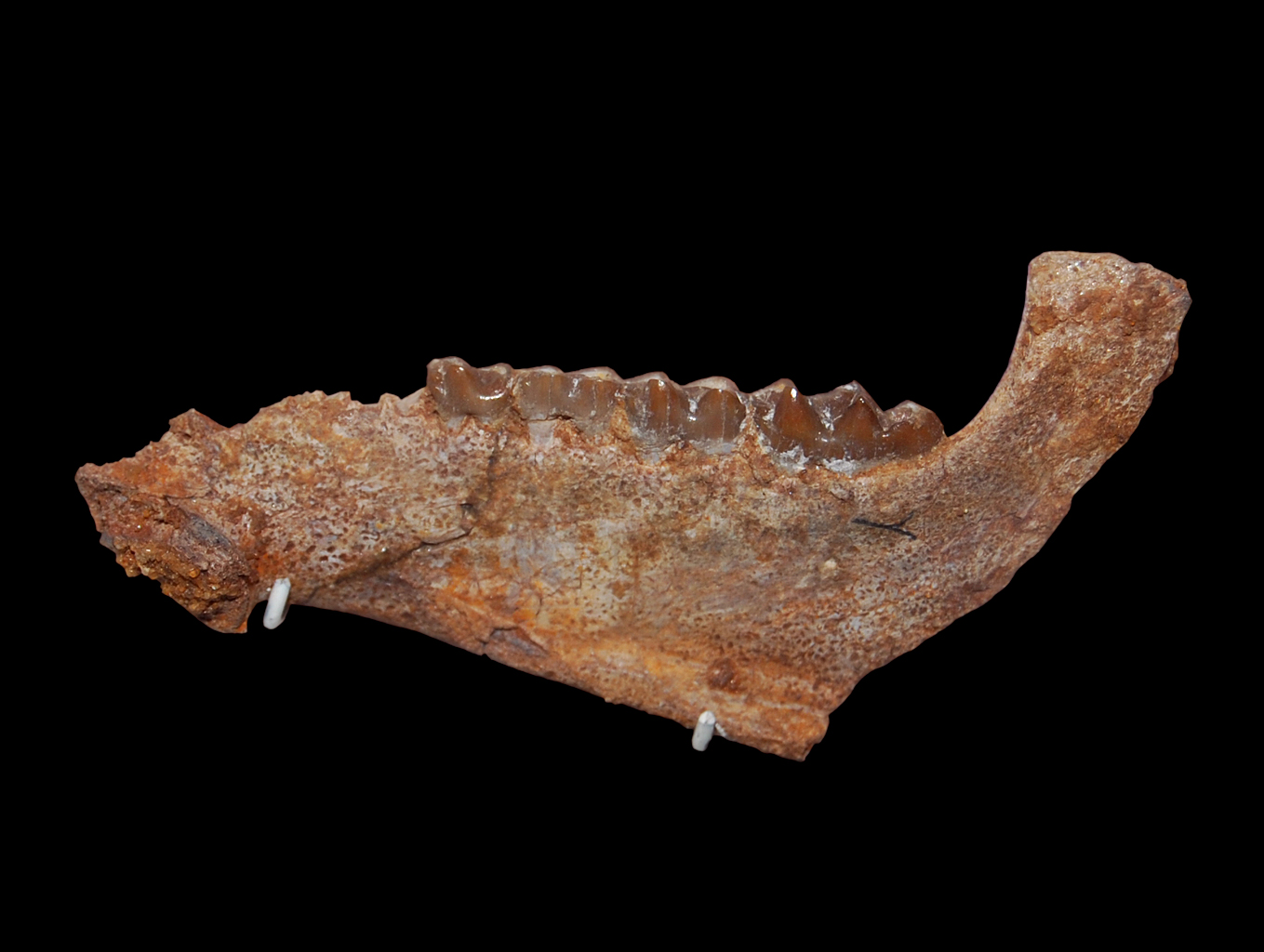

Scientific classification
- Kingdom: Animalia
- Phylum: Chordata
- Class: Mammalia
- Infraclass: Placentalia
- Order: Hyracoidea
- Family: †Pliohyracidae
- Subfamily: †Saghatheriinae
- Genus: †Saghatherium; Andrews and Beadnell, 1902

Type species
- Saghatherium antiquum Andrews and Beadnell, 1902

= Saghatherium =

Saghatherium Temporal range: Oligocene

Extinct genus of mammals

Saghatherium was a genus of herbivorous hyraxes that lived during the Oligocene period and what is now in Egypt, Libya and Oman.
