= Geniohyus =

Scientific classification
- Kingdom: Animalia
- Phylum: Chordata
- Class: Mammalia
- Order: Hyracoidea
- Family: †Pliohyracidae
- Subfamily: †Geniohyinae
- Genus: †Geniohyus; Andres, 1904

Species
- Geniohyus diphycus; Geniohyus gigas; Geniohyus magnus; Geniohyus micrognathus; Geniohyus mirus; Geniohyus subgigas

Extinct mammal

Geniohyus was a genus of herbivorous hyrax-grouped mammal.
