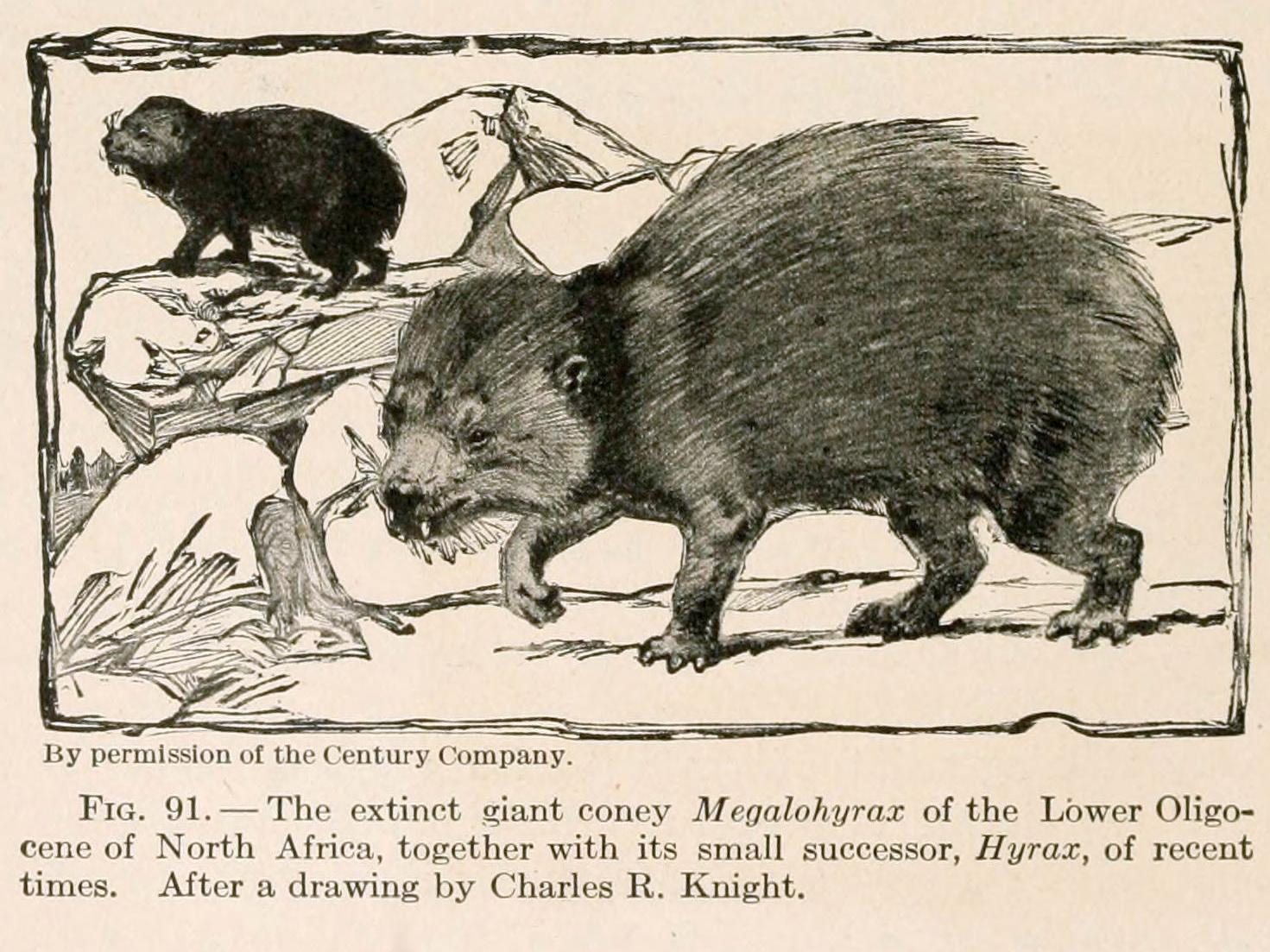

Scientific classification
- Kingdom: Animalia
- Phylum: Chordata
- Class: Mammalia
- Order: Hyracoidea
- Family: †Pliohyracidae
- Genus: †Megalohyrax; Andrews, 1903
- Species: †M. eocaenus

Binomial name
- †Megalohyrax eocaenus Andrews, 1903

Synonyms
- Mixohyrax Schlosser, 1910

= Megalohyrax =

Megalohyrax Temporal range: Lower Oligocene

Extinct genus of mammals

Megalohyrax is an extinct hyrax-grouped genus of herbivorous mammal that lived during the Oligocene, about 33-30 million years ago. Its fossils have been found in Africa and in Asia Minor.

== Description ==
This animal was very different from the current hyraxes and much larger, generally reaching the size of a tapir and sometimes exceeding 1.5 m (4 ft 11 in) in length. The legs were strong and the body very massive. The skull was long and low, unlike that of today's hyraxes, and could reach 391 mm (15.4 in) in length. Length of upper premolars and molars is 75 mm (3.0 in) and 86 mm (3.4 in), respectively. The dental formula of Megalohyrax was composed of three incisors, one canine, four premolars and three molars. It likely had an eustachian sac, a pouch-like structure found in some mammals that is connected to the eustachian tube.

== Classification and habitats ==
It was first described by Andrews in 1903. The type species is Megalohyrax eocaenus, was found in the El Fayum area in Egypt. Other fossils attributed to this kind have been found in Saudi Arabia and Ethiopia.

== See also ==
- Titanohyrax
- Gigantohyrax
- Largest prehistoric animals
