= Bunohyrax =

Scientific classification
- Domain: Eukaryota
- Kingdom: Animalia
- Phylum: Chordata
- Class: Mammalia
- Order: Hyracoidea
- Family: †Pliohyracidae
- Subfamily: †Saghatheriinae
- Genus: †Bunohyrax; Schlosser, 1910

Species
- Bunohyrax fajumensis; Bunohyrax major; Bunohyrax matsumatoi

Extinct family of mammals

Bunohyrax is an extinct genus of hyrax.
