= Thyrohyrax =

Scientific classification
- Kingdom: Animalia
- Phylum: Chordata
- Class: Mammalia
- Order: Hyracoidea
- Family: †Pliohyracidae
- Genus: †Thyrohyrax; Meyer, 1973

Species:
- †Thyrohyrax domorictus (type); †Thyrohyrax kenyaensis; †Thyrohyrax libycus; †Thyrohyrax litholagus; †Thyrohyrax lokutani; †Thyrohyrax meyeri; †Thyrohyrax microdon; †Thyrohyrax pygmaeus

Extinct mammal

Thyrohyrax was a genus of herbivorous hyrax-grouped mammal. It may have been semi-aquatic based on isotopic ratios of its tooth enamel.
