= Ngorora Formation =

Kenyan geological formation

- Stratigraphic range: Miocene13–10 Ma
- Type: Formation
- Underlies: Ngerngerwa Formation
- Overlies: Tiim Formation
- Thickness: 400 m (type)

Lithology
- Primary: clay, clastic rock, tuff, silt, shale, sand

Location
- Coordinates: 0.9°N 35.8°E
- Approximate paleocoordinates: 0.1°N 34.3°E
- Region: Rift Valley
- Country: Kenya

Type section
- Named for: Ngorora Administrative Location
- Named by: W.W. Bishop & G.R. Chapman
- Year defined: 1970
- Ngorora Formation (Kenya)

The Ngorora Formation is a geological formation in Kenya preserving fossils dating to the Miocene. The uppermost member of the formation shows sign of a faunal turnover that occurred around 11 to 10.5 million years ago, coinciding with faunal changes elsewhere in the world. This turnover includes the arrival of the horse Hipparion in East Africa. The Ngorora Formation was initially mapped by G.R. Chapman in collaboration with the East African Geological Research Unit (EAGRU) and formally described by Bishop & Chapman in 1970. Major fossil finds were made in the early 1970s, with expeditions to the area recovering thousands of mammal, fish and mollusc remains alongside less common fossil material of birds and reptiles.

== Geography ==
The formation is bordered to the west by the Elgeyo Escarpment, the east by the Laikipia Plateau and to the north by the Tiati volcanic center. To the south the formation is limited by the rising floor of the rift. During its deposition the formation contained two prominent upland areas, the topographic high of the Saimo Horst and Sidekh towards the north east, separated from the Saimo Horst by 8 km of lowland. The formation is roughly separated into four areas. Area I, the Kabarsero Type Area, split into Area Ia and Area Ib by the Kito Pass Fault; Area II west of the Cherial Fault, which includes the Tugen Hills, Kapkiamu Graben and Kaption Volcanic Complex; and Area III just south of the Saimo Horst.

== Geology and Stratigraphy ==
The basin the Ngorora Formation was deposited in is floored by the rocks of the underlying Tiim Formation and has seen repeated tectonic and volcanic activity around and during its deposition.

- Member A

Member A is a thick layer that consists of volcaniclastic material and clay in Area I of the region. The coarse volcanic sediments likely originated from the possibly reached this part of the formation in the form of lahars originating from the Kaption Volcanic Complex to the south-west.

- Member B

Member B shows a mix of gritty tuff beds, clay and silt. The lapilli tuff in Area I possibly correlates with similar lithology of Area II and on the upthrow of the Kito Pass Fault the layers of clay and silt found in the type area of the Member are absent, leaving sandy and gritty layers of tuff to lie directly over one another.

- Member C

The layers of Member C are closely overlying each other and consist of clay and shale with some sand in Area Ia, while in Area Ib slight erosion and channeling can be observed. The shale originated almost entirely through chemical precipitation while the clay likely originated through the erosion of the underlying Tiim Formation.

- Member D

Member D shows a mix of clay layers cross-bedded with gritty and silty tuffs. Slumps, fissures and faults indicate increased tectonic activity affecting the area during its time of deposition. Area III preserves a mix of red marbled earth and silt which may be equivalent to Member D. Following major faulting at Cheprimok, 130 meters of sediment of this member eroded in the Ngorora Formation, causing Member E to rest unconformably atop of Member A and even overstepping onto the Tiim Formation. This faulting event was widespread and even affected Area II 20 kilometers away.

- Member E

Another faulting event preceded the deposition of Member E, marking the return of lacustrine conditions as evident by kieselgur (sediments originating from algae) and fish-bearing shales. However tectonic uplift of the Kito Pass and Saimo Faults caused much of the record of this member to be lost to erosion.

During the deposition of the Ngorora Formation the area shows several signs of volcanic activity. The Kaption volcano in Area II is likely responsible for much of the lahar and tuff found in Area I. The Laikipia Area and Tiati volcanic center likewise contributed to the volcanic material of the formation.

== Paleoenvironment ==
The Ngorora Formation shows a great variety of environments and conditions throughout its stratigraphy. Mudcracks, Caliche, plant remains, bird footprints, channeling, signs of evaporation as well as various algae-based sediments all show signs of varying dry and wet conditions during the Miocene.

Member A preserves the bones of proboscideans and rhinos as well as the remains of reptiles and fish and represents an originally lacustrine environment with minor fluvial elements, all affected by lahas and other volcanic activity.

During the deposition of Member B Kaption Volcano was still active at irregular intervals. Member B shows signs of channeling caused by flowing water and flourishing plant growth (evidenced by root casts). At Kalimale weathering and plant growth were so extreme that all of the lapilli in a 45 cm thick layer was destroyed. The fauna of the member is of little use however, as the presence of channels means that animal material was likely derived from various localities over a great distance. Ruminant remains however have been used to derive an open or lightly wooded grassland habitat.

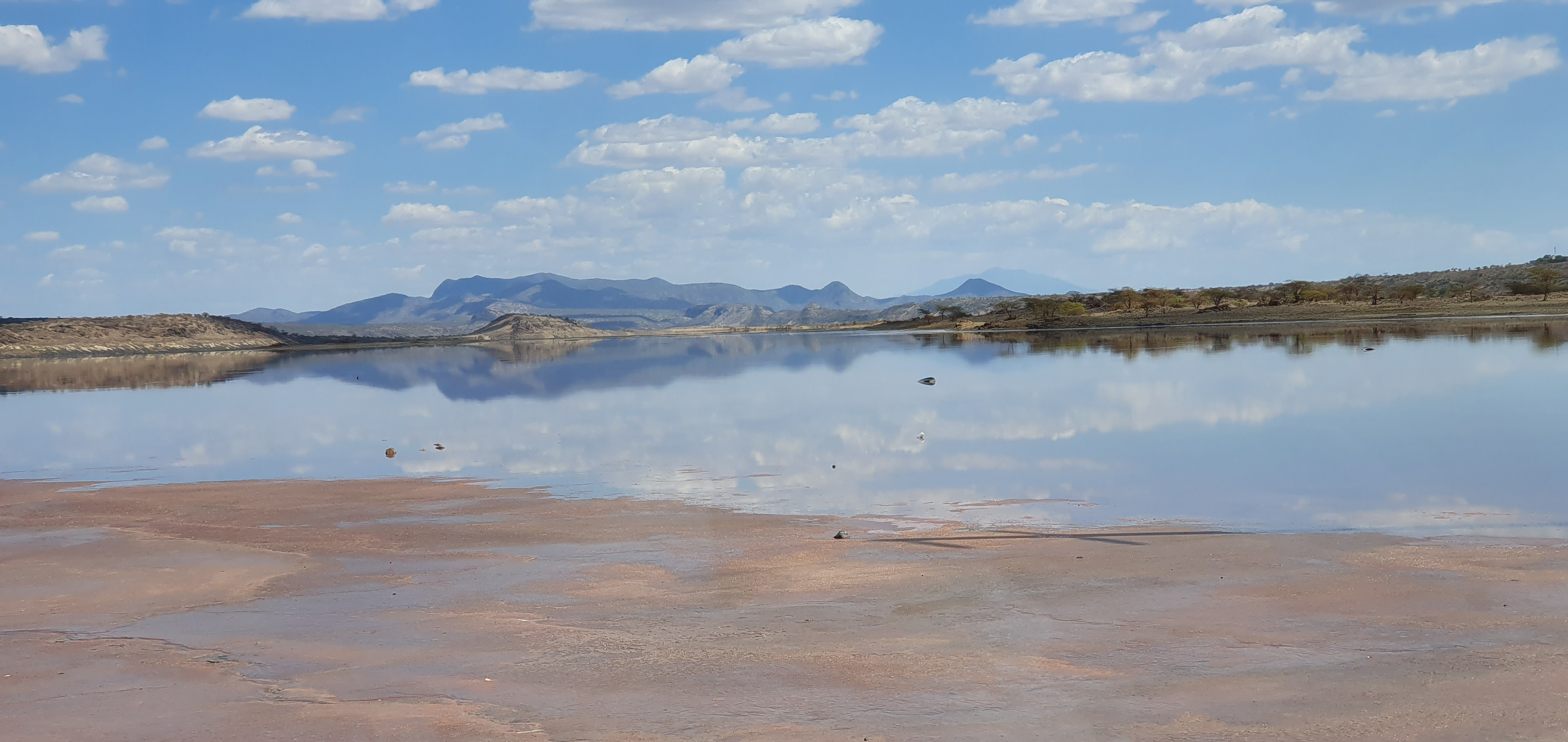
Lake Magadi, an alkaline lake in Kenya

After increased volcanic and tectonic activity at the beginning of Member C's deposition, three lakes formed in various regions of the formation. At least Kabarsero Lake in Area Ia was freshwater, evidence of which can be found in the presence of diatoms and freshwater crabs. Kapkiamu Lake meanwhile was likely alkaline and inhabited by cichlids of the genus Oreochromis. Similar conditions can be observed in the modern-day Lake Magadi, home to Alcolapia grahami. The rhythmic nature of the shale and clay deposits of Member C indicate seasonally fluctuating climate conditions, further supported by the growth rings of fossil wood. The two lakes were separated by 8 kilometers, which is not unusual given similar occurrences of freshwater and alkaline lakes in the modern day Rift Valley. The area between the lakes was covered by vigorously growing plant life, which lead to the creation of paleosol. The third lake west of Kaption Volcano was also freshwater.

Member D shows increased channeling indicative of rejuvenation through freshwater, which suggests a return of fluvial conditions as present in Member B. Also like in Member B, ruminants are used to infer an open or lightly wooded grassland environment in Area Ia. In Area Ib, ostracods, fish and crabs are all found in marginal lacustrine deposits at Kalimale. This lake underwent varying water levels and frequently dried up.

One particular locality within the lower members (12.6 Ma) of the Ngorora Formation is interpreted to have been a submontaine to lowland rainforest environment preserved by the ash from a local volcanic eruption. The presence of mostly microphyllous (small sized, single veined) leaves and only one leptophyllous (long, slender) leaf indicate a moist to wet environment for the preserved forest habitat. Of the preserved plant fossils, 15% can be classified as herbs, 5% as herbs or shrubs, 12% lianas and 62% as shrubs or trees. Some bias towards herbaceous plants is present due to the preservation through ashfall and the preserved leaves of shrubs and trees are consistent with leaf fall that occurs in forests. The locality shows no signs of a present leaflitter, either due to decomposition following ashfall or due to the rapid decay of plant material in tropical, wet forest environments (in particular during the wet season, prior to increased leaf fall with the onset of the dry season).

== Paleofauna ==
Color key: Taxon / Reclassified taxon / Taxon falsely reported as present / Dubious taxon or junior synonym / Ichnotaxon / Ootaxon / Morphotaxon	Notes; Uncertain or tentative taxa are in small text; ~~crossed out~~ taxa are discredited.

=== Molluscs ===
Name	Species	Member	Material	Notes	Image
Bellamya	B. sp.				Bellamya dissimilis
Lanistes	L. sp.				Lanistes bernardianus
Melanoides	M. tuberculata				Melanoides tuberculata
Mutela	M. sp.				Mutela bourguignati
Pleiodon	P. sp.				Pleiodon ovatus

=== Annelids ===
Name	Species	Member	Material	Notes	Image
Annelidae indet.		Member C Member D Member E			

=== Arthropods ===
Name	Species	Member	Material	Notes	Image
Candona	C. sp.				
Coleoptera indet.					
Diptera indet.					
Heterocypris?	H. sp.?				
Isoptera indet.					
Lepidoptera indet.					
Limnicythere	L. sp.				
Metacypris	M. sp.				
Potamon	C. sp.				

=== Fish ===
Name	Species	Member	Material	Notes	Image
cf. Clarias	cf. C. sp.	Member D Member E			
Cyprinidae indet.		Member C			
Baringochromis	B. senutae	Member E	more than a dozen skeletons	species flock of haplochromine cichlids	
Baringochromis	B. sonyii	Member E	five skeletons	species flock of haplochromine cichlids	
Baringochromis	B. tallamae	Member E	several skeletons	species flock of haplochromine cichlids	
Oreochromis	O. martyni	Member C		also known as "Sarotherodon" martyni, inhabitant of an alkaline lake	
Oreochromimos	O. kabchorensis	Member C	several complete skeletons	oldest known member of the Oreochromini	
Rebekkachromis	P. kiptalami	Member D	a nearly complete skeleton	pseudocrenilabrine cichlid likely inhabiting alkaline lakes, possible species flock	
Rebekkachromis	P. ngororus	Member D	a nearly complete skeleton	pseudocrenilabrine cichlid likely inhabiting alkaline lakes, possible species flock	
Rebekkachromis	P. valyricus	Member C	a skeleton	pseudocrenilabrine cichlid likely inhabiting alkaline lakes, possible species flock	
Rebekkachromis	P. vancouveringae	Member C	a skeleton	pseudocrenilabrine cichlid likely inhabiting alkaline lakes, possible species flock	
Rebekkachromis	P. spp.	Member A Member C	a skeleton	pseudocrenilabrine cichlid likely inhabiting alkaline lakes, possible species flock	
Tugenchromis	T. pickfordi	Member E	partially complete skeleton	pseudocrenilabrine cichlid	
Warilochromis	W. unicuspidatus	Member E	a single skeleton	pseudocrenilabrine cichlid	

=== Reptiles ===
Name	Species	Member	Material	Notes	Image
Crocodylus	C. sp.	Member A Member B Member C Member D Member E			Crocodylus niloticus
Ophidia indet.					
Pelusios	P. cf. sinuatus	Member A Member B Member E			Serrated Hinged Terrapin (Pelusios sinuatus)
Testudo	T. sp.	Member D			
Trionyx	T. sp.	Member B Member D Member E			
Varanidae indet.		Member B Member D			

=== Birds ===
Name	Species	Member	Material	Notes	Image
Anhinga	A. cf. pannonica		proximal end of the humerus		
Leptoptilos	L. sp.	Member C	a partial skeleton composed mostly of limb bones	one of the oldest known marabou skeletons	an extant species of marabou
Struthio	S. sp.	Member C	limb bones	distinct from the roughly contemporary S. coppensi	

=== Mammals ===
==== Afrotheres ====
===== Hyraxes =====
Name	Species	Member	Material	Notes	Image
Parapliohyrax	P. ngororaensis	Member B Member C Member D Member E	57 specimens, including isolated teeth, mandibles and crania	a type of hyrax	

===== Macroscelidea =====
Name	Species	Member	Material	Notes	Image
Macroscelididae indet.				an indetermined elephant shrew	

===== Orycteropodidae =====
Name	Species	Member	Material	Notes	Image
Myorycteropus	M. chemeldoi	Member B		a type of aardvark	

===== Proboscideans =====
Name	Species	Member	Material	Notes	Image
Afrochoerodon	A. ngorora	Member A Member D Member E		a choerolophodontine gomphothere.	
Choerolophodon	C. ngorora	Member A	Partial skeleton and maxillary fragments	A choerolophodontine gomphothere.	
Deinotherium	D. bozasi	Member D			
Zygolophodon	Z. turicensis	Member A			

===== Ptolemaiidae =====
Name	Species	Member	Material	Notes	Image
Kelba	K. quadeemae		A single lower molar and post cranial.	The most recent Ptolemaiidae known	

==== Artiodactyls ====
Name	Species	Member	Material	Notes	Image
Afrikanokeryx	A. leakeyi		Braincase with the posterior ossicones, associated with a left mandible.	Closely related to the modern Okapi	
Albanohyus	A. cf. castellensis		skull without teeth	a possible ancestor of Cainochoerus	
Anthracotheriidae indet.					
Climacoceras	C. gentryi			a giraffid	
Cephalophini? indet.				an indetermined species of duiker	
Dorcatherium	D. sp.			a genus of mouse deer	Dorcatherium
Gazella	G. sp.				
Gentrytragus	G. gentryi			Formerly assigned to Pseudotragus.	
Homoiodorcas	H. tugenicum				
Kenyapotamus	K. coryndonae	Member D Member E	molars	the possible ancestor of the modern hippos	
Kipsigicerus	K. labidotus			a close relative of the Four-horned antelope	Kipsigicerus labidotus
Lagomerycidae indet.					
Listriodon	L. bartulensis	Member A	mandible and teeth	the molars of this species are notably smaller than that of Eurasian taxa	mandible of Listriodon splendens from Europe
Lopholistriodon	L. kidogosana	Member B Member C Member D	skull and teeth as well as a fragment of a mandibular symphysis	Lopholistriodon marks another decrease in size within the African listriodontine lineage	
Morotochoerus	M. ugandensis				
Palaeotragus	P. sp.			Remains attributed to P. primaevus have been assigned to a new genus and species, Afrikanokeryx leakeyi.	Palaeotragus-Tianjin Natural History Museum
Protoryx	P. solignaci			Remains from Ngorora might belong to an indeterminate reduncine.	
Pseudotragus?	P.? gentryi				
?Reduncini indet.	Several indeterminate species			Include some remains formerly attributed to the genera Antidorcas and Pachytragus. Some of the horn cores might belong to Kobus aff. porrecticornis.	
Samotherium?	S. sp.			a genus of giraffid	Samotherium skull angled view from the Natural History Museum collections
Sivoreas	S. eremita	Member A Member C Member D	horn cores	a boselaphine bovid	
Tetraconodontinae	Indetermidate.		Perhaps belonging to a species more primitive than Nyanzachoerus		

==== Carnivorans and Hyaenodonts ====
Name	Species	Member	Material	Notes	Image
Amphicyonidae indet.			molar		
Dissopsalis	D. pyroclasticus		an incomplete first or second molar	A genus of teratodontine hyaenodontid.	
Eomellivora	E. tugenensis	Member D	a broken snout	a relative of the modern honey badger of similar size	the mandible of the related Eomellivora piveteaui (Spain)
Herpestidae	Indeterminate.	Member A	a right mandible	an indetermined mongoose	
Megistotherium	M. osteothlastes	Member A Member D	a damaged molar and distal end of a humerus	A large hypercarnivorous hyaenodont.	Megistotherium
Myacyon	M. kiptalami	Member D	a snout broken behind the second molar	a species as large or slightly larger than an African Lion, originally considered to belong to the genus Agnotherium	
Percrocuta	P. tobieni	Member B Member D Member E	a left mandible fragment	a lioness-sized genus of percrocutids or true hyaenas	
Tugenictis	T. ngororaensis	Member A	a right molar	a genus of viverrid similar in size to the African Civet	
Vishnuonyx	V. chinjiensis	Member D	a premolar	a genus of otter	
Viverridae indet.		Member B	a mandible with fragments of the premolars	the morphology resembles the genus Genetta more than it does Viverra and is slightly larger	

==== Perissodactyls ====
===== Equids =====
Name	Species	Member	Material	Notes	Image
Hipparion	H. sp.	Member E	tooth fragments and other remains	dated to 11 to 10.5 Ma, the fossils at Ngorora indicate a rapid dispersal of the genus throughout Africa and Eurasia	Hipparion gracile skull

===== Rhinocerotids =====
Name	Species	Member	Material	Notes	Image
Aceratherium	A. acutirostratum			A hornless rhinoceros, originally attributed to a new genus, Turkanatherium.	
Brachypotherium	B. sp.			although the genus was reported, no detailed description or figures were given, rendering a more detailed assignment not possible	
Chilotheridium	C. sp.	Member E	a maxillary fragment including several teeth	originally described as C. pattersoni, subsequent research showed the fossil is not well preserved enough for such an assignment	

==== Primates ====
Name	Species	Member	Material	Notes	Image
Catarrhini indet.			canine	possible hominoid clearly distinct from Proconsul	
Hominoidea indet.		Member C	incisor and premolar	a large hominoid similar to Proconsul or Equatorius	
Microcolobus	M. tugenensis			a colombine monkey.	
Victoriapithecus	V. sp.	Member B Member C	various teeth	possibly a new species of the genus	Victoriapithecus

==== Rodents ====
Name	Species	Member	Material	Notes	Image
Bathyergidae indet.					
Cricetidae indet. A					
Cricetidae indet. B					
Cricetomyinae indet.					
Dendromurinae indet.					
Pedetidae?		Member B			
Phiomyidae					
cf. Vulcanisciurus	cf. Vulcanisciurus sp.			A genus of squirrel.	

== Paleoflora ==
Name	Species	Member	Material	Notes	Image
Acalypha	A. sp.			a type of herb/shrub	Acalypha hidpida
Acanthaceae					
Artabotrys	A. sp.			a type of shrub	Artabotrys hexapetalus
Bignoniaceae					
cf. Cola	cf. C. sp.			a species of the tree canopy	Cola acuminata, flower of the Kola Nut tree
Dioscorea	D. sp.			a liana	Dioscorea sansibarensis
Graminae				a type of grass	
Icacinaceae					
Lasiodiscus	L. sp.			an understory taxon	Lasiodiscus mildbraedii
Loganiaceae/Melastomataceae					
Menispermaceae					
Myrtaceae					
Mystroxylon	M. sp.			a type of shrub/tree	Mystroxylon aethiopicum subsp schlechteri
Olacaceae					
Pollia	P. tugenensis		stems, leaves and fruit	a dominant plant of the herbaceous layer, Pollia tugenensis likely grew in clusters	the fruit of P. tugenensis resemble those of the Marble Berry (Pollia condensata), the leaves however are closer to P. zollingeri
Rauvolfia	R. sp.			a tree or shrub	Rauvolfia tetraphylla
Rubiaceae					
Rutaceae					
Sapindaceae					
cf. Sapium	cf. S. sp.			a type of milkree	Sapium glandulosum
cf. Sapotaceae					
Tiliaceae					
Violaceae					
cf. Zizyphus	cf. Z. sp.			a spiny shrub/tree of the buckthorn family	Zizyphus sp.
