= Postschizotherium =

Postschizotherium Temporal range: Pliocene–Pleistocene

Scientific classification
- Kingdom: Animalia
- Phylum: Chordata
- Class: Mammalia
- Order: Hyracoidea
- Family: †Pliohyracidae
- Subfamily: †Pliohyracinae
- Genus: †Postschizotherium; Von Koenigswald, 1932

Type species
- Postchizotherium chardini Von Koenigswald, 1932

Species
- P. chardini (Von Koenigswald, 1932); P. intermedium (Von Koenigswald, 1966); P. orientalis? (Tong & Huang, 1952)

Synonyms
- Postschizotherium licenti (Von Koenigswald, 1966)

Extinct genus of mammals

Postschizotherium is an extinct genus of pliohyracid, a family closely related to but considerably larger than living hyraxes. it was likely a semiaquatic herbivore, compared by paleontologists in ecology with the modern hippopotamus. Postschizotherium is the last known member of its subfamily, the Pliohyracinae. It lived in modern-day Russia and China at the end of the Pliocene and in the Early Pleistocene.

== History of research ==
Between 1924 and 1926, Emile Licent, founder and director of the Musée Hoangho Paiho of Tianjin, and his fellow Jesuit Pierre Teilhard de Chardin led extensive field work in the Nihewan Basin, collecting a vast diversity of fossils belonging to a then unknown Pleistocene fauna. Those fossils were then formally described by Teilhard de Chardin and Jean Piveteau in 1930, forming the basis of what is today known as the Nihewan Fauna. Among the remains found by Licent in Nihewan figured a first upper left molar and an associated third premolar. Teilhard de Chardin and Piveteau noted that, by their general shape, those teeth shared considerable similarities with those of the chalicotheres, a group of large, clawed perissodactyls also present in Nihewan. However, the differences with known chalicotheres being substantial, Teilhard de Chardin and Piveteau concluded that those remains represented a new genus of chalicothere.

In 1932, following this identification, Gustav von Koenigswald, considering that the gap between the Nihewan fossils and its nearest relatives within the chalicotheres was too important for the former to belong to a pre-existing genus, redescribed those remains as the new genus and species Postschizotherium chardini, honouring in the species name Teilhard de Chardin. He speculated that the animal was the most recent and derived representative of an hypsodont line of chalicotheres, related to Metaschizotherium. In 1933, Teilhard de Chardin and Pei Wenzhong tentatively referred to a lower molar discovered in the Locality 12 of Zhoukoudian, near Beijing, to the genus. In 1936, Teilhard de Chardin and Licent described additional material referable to Postschizotherium sp., the anterior parts of a mandible and a maxilla belonging to the same individual, discovered in the Yushe Basin in Shanxi; they noted that Postschizotherium represented an abherrant type of chalicothere. In 1939, Teilhard de Chardin described two additional anterior parts of the mandible discovered by Licent and Trassaert in the same Pliocene-aged deposits in Shanxi that had yielded the first mandible. He considered that all three specimens represented different species, firstly differentiated by their size, one much larger, the other much smaller than the jaw described in 1936, and tentatively restricted P. chardini to the largest specimen. The exact zoological affinities still puzzled Teilhard de Chardin; the discovery of postcranial chalicothere material in Nihewan seemed to support his previous assumption, while George Gaylord Simpson noted that the teeth shared similarities with those of hyracoids, and Edwin H. Colbert proposed an affinity with the palaeotheres, based on the shape of the molars. Between 1937 and 1939, an additional tooth of enigmatic affinities was uncovered in the Middle Pliocene Cap Travertin in Zhoukoudian by Pei Wenzhong, which tentatively attributed it to Postschizotherium.

During the late 1940s, teeth remains discovered in the Soblay lignites in southern France were identified as belonging to a close relative of Postschizotherium, that Jean Viret named Neoschizotherium rossignoli. In 1949, with the discovery of additional material from the same locality, Viret constated that the Soblay specimens likely belonged to the widespread hyracoid genus Pliohyrax, as P. rossignoli. Therefore, on the basis of the resemblance with the dentition of Pliohyrax, and as Gaylord Simpson had predicted, Viret repositioned Postschizotherium as an hyracoid closely related to Pliohyrax. He inferred that, originating in Africa, the hyracoid lineage had expanded northward, briefly entering Europe up to the Atlantic, and surviving up to the Quaternary in East Asia.

In 1966, Von Koenigswald distinguished three distinct species of Postschizotherium in China, representing three different stages, P. chardini being the younger, dating from the Early Pleistocene. He therefore established two new species : the Early Pliocene P. licenti, based on a single tooth he bought in a drugstore in Hong Kong, of unknown provenance, and to which he referred an additional fragmentary mandible from the Yushe Basin examined by Teilhard de Chardin in 1939 ; and the Middle Pliocene P. intermedium, based on the third mandible from Yushe and the tentatively assigned fossilized teeth from Zhoukoudian discovered by Pei in 1939. He formally referred the genus as belonging to Pliohyracinae, and speculated that the adaptations towards hypsodonty were typical of an environmental shift towards drier, savannah-like

In a 1974 article which reestablished Neoschizotherium for the two French species of Pliohyrax, Tong Yongsheng and Huang Wanbo criticized this split as premature due to a lack of overlapping material and difficulties to ensure precise datations. They also signaled the discovery of additional remains tentatively assigned to the genus in Zhoukoudian, and removed the mandible fragment from P. licenti, as the absence of overlapping material limited its exact identification.

In 1978, Emile Heintz, Léonard Ginsburg and Jean-Louis Hartenberger described formally remains collected in the 1970s in Afghanistan. Among the remains figured an hyracoid radius of large size, found in Pliocene-aged deposits near Jalalabad, in the east of the country. Similar in size to the two smaller species of Postschizotherium, P. intermedium and P. licenti, it was tentatively referred to the genus, although the absence of overlapping material hindered additional identification. The subsequent discovery of Pliohyrax in Miocene layers of the same country led to further discussions regarding the assignation of the remains.

In 1981, Qiu Zhangxiang referred to the genus an additional mandible found in the collection of the Tianjin Natural History Museum, of unknown provenance, to the genus, as Postschizotherium cf. chardini. Qiu speculated that, due to anatomical similarities, the genus was closely related to Parapliohyrax. In 1995, a study by Gary T. Schwartz, David Tab Rasmussen and Richard J. Smith estimated the size of extinct hyracoids based on the of their dentition and proposed that P. chardini weighed between 900 and 1432 kg. In 1996, Zong Guanfu described a new species of Postschizotherium, P. tibetensis, from the Hengduan Mountains of Sichuan, China, based on a maxilla and two mandibles, and referred to the genus an additional maxilla from the same site. In 2002, Qiu, Wei Qi, Pei Shuwen and Chen Zheying redescribed P. intermedium on the basis of two new crania associated with their mandibles collected by Wei and Chen between 1981 and 1983 in the locality 81018, in Tianzhen County, Shanxi. Additionally, they considered that the holotype of P. licenti had been misidentified and that it was therefore a junior synonym of P. chardini, and that most of the material referred to Postschizotherium by Zong in 1996 belonged in reality to schizotheres, although the maxilla designated as type for P. tibetensis was genuine. In 2003, Chen Guanfang erected P. tibetensis as its own genus, Hengduanshanhyrax.

In 2009, Nakaya Hideo, Takai Masanaru, Fukuchi Akira and Ogino Shintaro reported the first fossil remains of Postschizotherium outside of China. The material, consisting in several associated teeth, were collected near Udunga, Buryatia, in Transbaikalian Russia, and was originally described as Postschizotherium cf. chardini. These remains were described in 2013 by N. P. Kalmykov, who confirmed its identification.

In 2025, a largely complete skull of Postschizotherium cf. intermedium was described from Longdan, northern China, dating to the Early Pleistocene.
