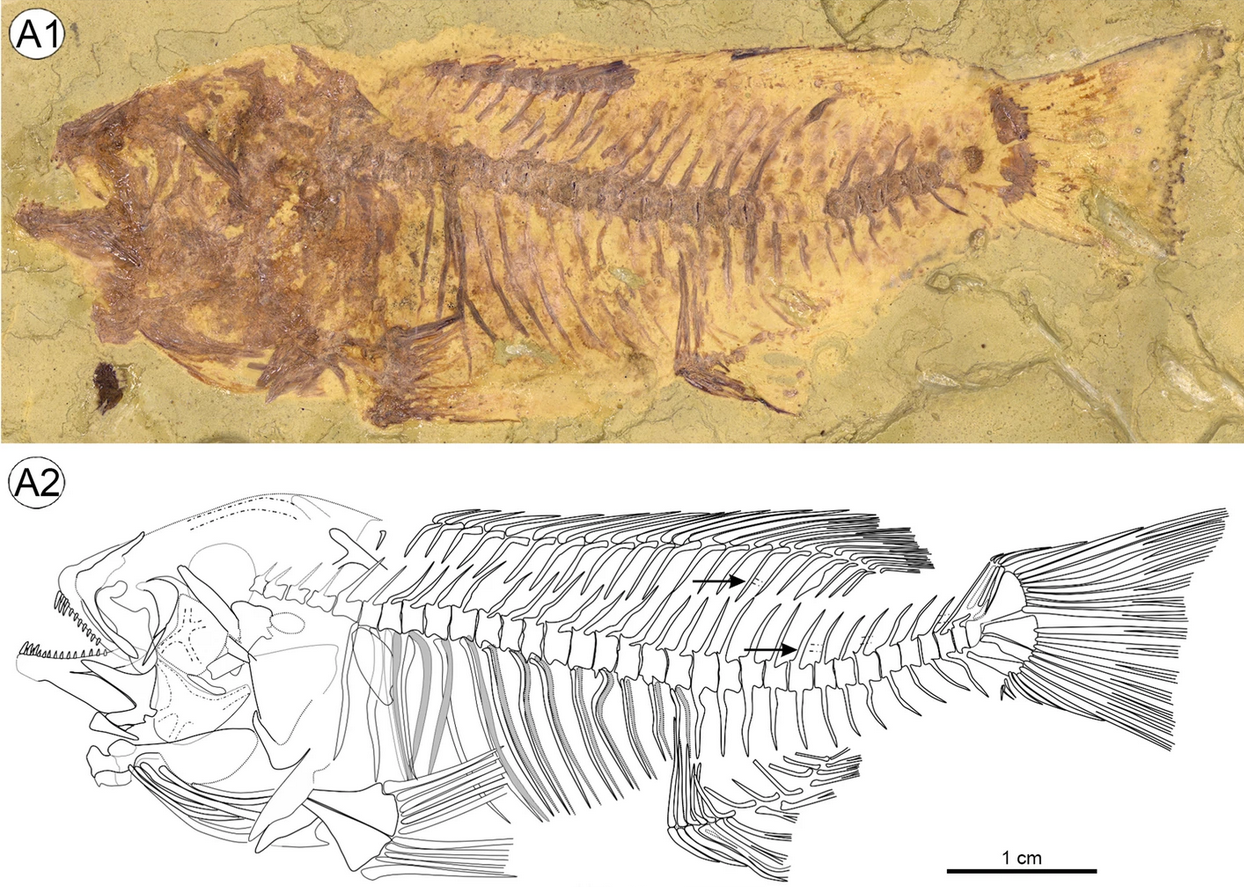
- Photograph and an interpretative drawing of the holotype of Warilochromis unicuspidatus

Scientific classification
- Kingdom: Animalia
- Phylum: Chordata
- Class: Actinopterygii
- Order: Cichliformes
- Family: Cichlidae
- Tribe: Haplochromini
- Genus: †Warilochromis; Altner et al., 2020

Type species
- †Warilochromis unicuspidatus Altner et al., 2020

= Warilochromis =

Warilochromis Temporal range: Late Miocene (Tortonian), ~10–9 Ma

Extinct genus of predatory cichlid fish

Warilochromis is an extinct genus of predatory cichlid fish known from the Late Miocene Ngorora Formation of Kenya. It represents one of the oldest known members of the tribe Haplochromini, and only the species Warilochromis unicuspidatusis currently recognized.

== History and naming ==
Warilochromis has been discovered at the Waril locality, which belongs to Member E of the Ngorora Formation in Kenya. The holotype, and sole known specimen, of this genus is an almost complete skeleton, only missing a handful of bones, of which solely imprints are visible.

Its generic name is a combination of “Waril”, the place where it was found, and Ancient Greek χρόμις (“chromis”), which has been applied to a variety of fish, and is a common element in the scientific names of cichlids. The specific name “unicuspidatus” combines the Latin words “unus”, meaning “one”, and “cuspis”, meaning “point”, referencing the remarkable dentition of its oral jaws.

== Description ==
Warilochromis reached a total length of 8.2 cm, with a standard length of 6.9 cm, a third of which is made up by its massive skull. Its oral teeth are unicuspid, with large canines (0.6-1.1 mm) in the outer row and smaller teeth in the inner row, whereas the pharyngeal teeth are mostly slender and bicuspid, possessing a prominent cusp and shoulder, interspersed with broader bicuspid teeth, that have one prominent and minor cusp, respectively. Its jaws are probably of the same width. The body is stout, and reaches its greatest depth behind the head. Its caudal peduncle is short and narrow.

The preserved fossils showcase that it had a low supraoccipital crest as well as a straight and massive parasphenoid. Only the lacrimal remains of the infraorbital series, either because the adjacent infraorbitals were reduced or not fossilized. The premaxilla is slender, and its ramus is as long as the maxilla. The head possesses a robust neurocraniad process. The lower arm of the sturdy right dentary is probably of the same length as the upper arm, although deeper. The robust palatine is bent and ventrally associated with a small, slender ectopterygoid. A robust ventral process is present in the hyomandibula, as are large, dorsally directed articulation facets. The crushed opercle was likely rather large and triangular. The sturdy ventral hypohyals bear a posteroventrally directed spine, whereas the anterior ceratohyal suddenly becomes more slender towards the midline. A triangular basihyal is visible between the ceratohyals and dentary. The vertebral column is slightly concave in the caudal region. Of the 33 vertebrae, 19 are abdominal and 14 caudal. The hourglass-shaped vertebral centra are higher than long, with the first and penultimate being the shortest ones. Meanwhile, the neural spines increase in length towards the posterior, with the spines of the last abdominal to first three caudal vertebrae being the longest, before their length decreases towards the caudal fin. Each pelvic fin has a strong spine and five branched, segmented rays, that probably don't reach the origin of the anal fin. The continuous dorsal fin has 14 spines, which increase in length posteriorly, and 10 rays which are branched as well as segmented. Meanwhile, the anal fin possesses three strong spines, that gradually increase in length, and nine rays, which reach the first third of the caudal peduncle. There are twelve pterygiophores, which decrease posteriorly, with the first two being fused. Unlike in modern cichlids, the first pterygiophore is longer than the second one. The slightly truncate caudal fin consists of 16 segmented principal fin rays, the upper and lowermost of which are unbranched. These rays are supported by the parhypural as well as the hypural plates 1 + 2 and 3 + 4. A small and slender fifth hypural plate is positioned between the hypural plates 3 + 4 and the second epural. Scales cover almost its whole body, except for the predorsal part and the head.

== Classification ==
Warilochromis is a member of the tribe Haplochromini, possibly closely related to the genus Pseudocrenilabrus, with which it shares an unusual lacrimal. However, there are some notable morphological differences between these two genera, although these may be explained by their different ecological adaptions, with Pseudocrenilabrus being an inhabitant of rivers and streams, whereas Warilochromis was a lake-dweller. Its age and geographical location, rather far removed from Lake Tanganyika, makes it useful for understanding the evolutionary history of the tribe. It makes proposals, that haplochromine originated within the last nine million years unlikely, and refutes an age of 5-6 Ma as the onset of the divergence within the tribe, as well as the ‘out of Tanganyika’ hypothesis, which proposes Lake Tanganyika as cradle of all haplochromine cichlids. Both it and Tugenochromis, which was discovered at the same locality, also suggest that the Central Kenya Rift and Lake Tanganyika were hydrologically connected during the late Miocene, which is consistent with prior geological studies, that pointed towards an east–west connection between the Malagarasi and Congo prior to the formation of Lake Tanganyika. Therefore, it is likely that the progenitors of the Lake Tanganyika Radiation were already present in the eastern branch of the East African Rift System during the Miocene. The only other possible fossil haplochromine is an unnamed species from Saudi Arabia, which would be the oldest known member of the tribe. As both it and Warilochromis are known east of Lake Tanganyika, it supports the hypothesis that haplochromines originated in this region, which is supported by molecular data.

Below is a cladogram showcasing the phylogenetic relationships of Warilochromis, taken from Altner et al., 2020:

- Cichlidae
  - Ptychochrominae
  - - Paratilapia
    - - Etroplinae
      - - Heterochromis
        - - Cichlinae
          - Pseudocrenilabrinae
            - Tylochromis
            - - Warilochromis
              - - The Rest
                - - - Chromidotilapiini
                    - Tilapiini
                  - - Pelmatochromis
                    - - Lamprologini
                      - Hemichromini

== Palaeoecology and paleoenvironment ==
The fang-like caniniform teeth of this fish showcase that it was a predator. Among predatory cichlids, three different hunting strategies are known: Pursuit hunters, ambush hunters and ballistic hunters (also known as the “sit-and-pursue” strategy). The first category requires a streamlined body shape, quite unlike that of the compact Warilochromis, suggesting it belonged to one of the other two categories. Ambush hunters are rare among cichlids, with this strategy being only known from the Yellowjacket cichlid and Nimbochromis, both of which feign to be a dead to attract prey, whereas ballistic hunters are far more common.

The palaeolake Waril, where Warilochromis lived, has been estimated to cover an area of about 30–35 km^{2}, although it may have been considerably larger, and was likely connected to a river or stream, as shown by fossil remains belonging to crocodiles, turtles, and a handful transported mammal bones. The preservation of fish fossils shows that conditions at the bottom of the lake were anoxic. It was of volcanic origin, only existing for about 10,000–20,000 years, with warm and alkaline water, similar to Lake Apoyo. Other cichlids known from this lake include a species flock, consisting of at least three species, of Baringochromis and Tugenchromis. The former likely fed on either insects or plant matter, whereas the diet of the latter is unknown, as no dentition belonging to this genus has been discovered. However, its rarity suggests that it may have lived near the rocky shore of the lake. In this habitat, Warilochromis may have been a hunter of young fish.
