= Pleiodon =

Pleiodon may refer to:

- Pleiodon, a genus of grasses currently considered to be a synonym of Bouteloua
- Pleiodon (bivalve), a genus within the family Iridinidae
