= Mutela alata =

Conservation status
- Least Concern (IUCN 3.1)

Scientific classification
- Kingdom: Animalia
- Phylum: Mollusca
- Class: Bivalvia
- Order: Unionida
- Family: Iridinidae
- Genus: Mutela
- Species: M. alata

Binomial name
- Mutela alata (Lea, 1864)

Species of bivalve

Mutela alata is a species of freshwater mussel in the family Iridinidae. It is endemic to Malawi, where it is known from only five locations in Lake Malawi and the Shire River.
