= Parapliohyrax =

Parapliohyrax Temporal range: Miocene (Serravallian-Tortonian) ~16-11 Ma

Scientific classification
- Kingdom: Animalia
- Phylum: Chordata
- Class: Mammalia
- Order: Hyracoidea
- Family: †Pliohyracidae
- Genus: †Parapliohyrax; Lavocat, 1961

Type species
- Parapliohyrax mirabilis Lavocat, 1961

Species
- P. mirabilis Lavocat, 1961; P. ngororaensis Pickford & Fischer, 1987

Extinct genus of mammals

Parapliohyrax is an extinct genus of large hyracoid, a group today represented only by the diminutive hyraxes, but with fossil species encompassing a much greater diversity in ecology and morphology. Parapliohyrax lived during the Miocene period, in various localities spanning the entirety of the African continent. Two species have been identified, based on cranial remains: Parapliohyrax mirabilis, the type species, known from the Miocene of Morocco and Tunisia, and P. ngororaensis, discovered in Kenyan and Namibian deposits. Isolated postcranial remains attributed to the genus have been identified in South African and Libyan deposits of the same age.

== History ==
=== Description of P. mirabilis ===
: Localities where P. mirabilis remains have been discovered.
: localities where P. ngororaensis remains have been discovered.
: localities where remains tentatively attributed to Parapliohyrax have been discovered.

The holotype specimen of Parapliohyrax, consisting of a relatively complete maxilla and an associated mandible, were first collected soon after the discovery in 1951 of the Beni Mellal fossil locality in Morocco. In 1961, René Lavocat identified the specimen as a new genus and species of hyracoid, which he named Parapliohyrax mirabilis. This description, however, was only superficial, the specimen still being encased in paraffin wax due to its extreme fragility. The fossil stayed in this state for more than a decade until 1977, when Léonard Ginsburg redescribed the holotype after a lengthy preparation, and attributed to the genus various mandibular remains and isolated teeth from the same locality prepared by Jacques Braillon.

=== Description of P. ngororaensis ===
Between 1969 and 1975, extensive excavations in the Ngorora Formation in the Great Rift Valley of Kenya led to the discovery of cranial remains belonging to a new type of large hyracoid. In 1987, Martin Pickford and Martin S. Fischer formally described these new remains as a distinct species, Parapliohyrax ngororaensis. In 1996, additional remains of P. ngororaensis, discovered at Berg Aukas, near Grootfontein, Namibia, were described by Pickford.

=== Additional assigned material ===
In 1999, the manager of a mine near Hondeklip Bay, in the Northern Cape region of South Africa, discovered in a diamond-bearing locality labeled "Nova pit" the remains of a fragmentary metapodial bone that was identified as that of a primitive horse. In 2003, after further inspection, Pickford concluded that this single bone belonged to a large hyrax, and attributed it tentatively, due to the lack of overlapping material, to P. ngororaensis, based on its presence in Berg Aukas at the time of the deposition of the Nova pit. Pickford mentioned in passing in the same paper the presence of P. mirabilis in Miocene deposits near Kairouan, in Tunisia, belonging to the Beglia Formation. In 2005, Tsujikawa Hiroshi described a single and isolated premolar tooth coming from the Lower Namurungule Formation, in the Samburu Hills near Baragoi, Kenya, and considered the similarities with those of Parapliohyrax, classifying it as an indeterminate Pliohyracidae due to the paucity of the material and the lack of element of comparison with other taxa. In 2006, an additional isolated metapodial discovered by R. J. G. Savage in the locality W of Gebel Zelten, Libya, was tentatively attributed to Parapliohyrax sp. based on its similarity with the Nova specimen. In the same year, Jean-Albert Rémy and Mouloud Benammi mentioned in passing the presence of Parapliohyrax sp. in the Vallesian fauna of the Aït Kandoula Basin near Toundoute, Morocco.

=== Classification ===
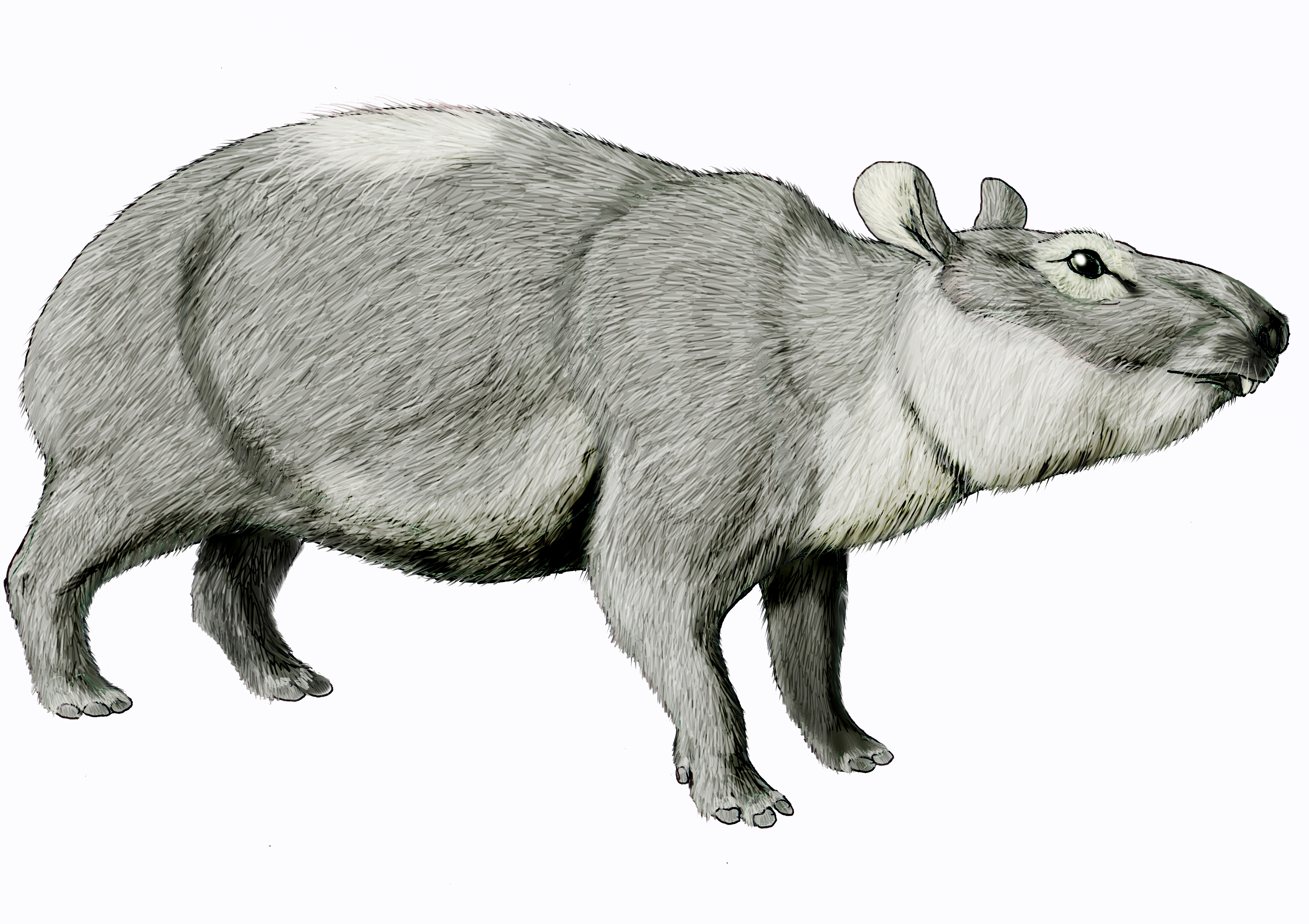
Life restoration of the related genus Pliohyrax

Ginsburg, in its redescription of the holotype of P. mirabilis in 1977, assigned the genus to the family Pliohyracidae, along with Prohyrax, Meroehyrax and Pliohyrax, while noting in passing the similarities in their dentition with that of the Oligocene hyrax Saghatherium. Pickford, in his 1987 description of P. ngororaensis, noted that the fragmentary remains of several species of pliohyracids impede their systematic classification. He recovers however Parapliohyrax as monophyletic and as the sister taxa of Prohyrax, this clade being itself the sister group of a clade formed by Pliohyrax graecus and Kvabebihyrax, with the Pliocene-Pleistocene genus Postschizotherium as the earliest diverging member of the Pliohyracidae, such as :

- Pliohyracidae
  - Postschizotherium
  - - - - Pliohyrax
        - Kvabebihyrax
      - - Prohyrax
        - Parapliohyrax

More recently, Tab Rasmussen and Mercedes Gutiérrez noted that the radiation of the three African genera of pliohyracids Meroehyrax, Prohyrax and Parapliohyrax appears to be at the root of the later radiation of Eurasian pliohyracids. They also observed that all three African genera shared the typical single set of hypsodont and elongated blades on the teeth of their mandible and maxilla. Their study confirmed the relationships between Prohyrax and Parapliohyrax, and added that the common ancestor of both genera probably resembled Meroehyrax. More tentatively, they proposed that primitive characters in the anatomy of P. mirabilis and its repartition along the southern coast of the Mediterranean might be an indication that it was ancestral to the later pliohyracids that radiated along the northern coast of the same sea.

== Description ==
=== Cranial material ===
==== Maxilla ====
Cranial materials of both species are relatively well preserved, and present a relatively complete dentition. The snout of P. mirabilis was noticeably longer than that of Pliohyrax, with a remarquably deep palate forming a palatine pocket overarching the rear suture of the palatine bones, that can be compared to that of modern lagomorphs, the springhare Pedetes, and the early astrapothere Trigonostylops; overall, despite many similarities in the shape of the cranium, the skull was more elongated than that of modern hyraxes. As in Procavia, the nasals were projected forwards. The dentition of Parapliohyrax is distinctively more derived than that of most other extinct and modern hyraxes, to the exception of Pliohyrax. The first upper incisor was noticeably larger and stronger, slightly convex towards the palate with a marked bend, and bearing wearing on a posterior face devoid of enamel, as in modern hyraxes. Differences in size between specimens of those incisors were tentatively attributed by Ginsburg to sexual dimorphism. The second upper incisor was slightly spatulate and oriented towards the palate. The third upper incisor was diminutive, premolariform and triangle-shaped. The upper canine and premolar teeth were molariform and quite similar from each others, as in other large hyracoids like Pliohyrax and Megalohyrax. The molars are much stronger and elongated, with the hypocone of the jugal teeth increasingly protruding towards the back, giving the teeth a typical square profile with wear.

==== Mandible ====
The body of the mandible of P. mirabilis was relatively high and concave, with a noticeable pit on the internal face between the second premolar and the second molar, similar to that of Meroehyrax, and another, smaller, pit on the external face between the first and the fourth premolar, delimited towards the front by the mental foramen. The ramus of the mandible, incompletely preserved, seems to have been less vertical than that of the modern Procavia. The lower incisors are spatulated and dentelated, with a small first lower incisor, a second lower incisor quite strong and slightly coiled, and a third lower incisor triangle-shaped, premolariform and similar in its structure to that of bovids and cervids. The lower canine and premolar teeth are elongated and quite similar, by the presence of a W-shaped ridge crossing their entire section, to those of chalicotheres. The molars bear tubercles in the shape of curved crescents, with the third molar bearing an extensive, internally concave and crescent-shaped lobe, similar to that of modern horses.

=== Postcranial material ===
The postcranial material attributed to Parapliohyrax is extremely scarce, a condition not uncommon among Cenozoic hyracoids. The only postcranial material attributed to the genus consist in metapodial bones. This attribution is only done tentatively, as there is no material overlapping between these bones and the cranial remains that are relatively well known. This attribution is therefore mostly based on the large size of the remains, only reached by Parapliohyrax in Africa during the Miocene, and on the presence of the genus in their general region.

Two metapodial bones have been tentatively referred to Parapliohyrax. The first one, discovered near Hondeklip Bay in Namibia, consist in the distal portion of a metatarsus, reaching 32.6 mm in its maximal diameter. The second, coming from the Djebel Zelten region of Libya, is too fragmentary to determine whether its a metatarsus or a metacarpus, 29 mm long in its largest diameter. Overall, based on the fossil material, Pickford estimates that P. ngororaensis reached 80 kilos, the weight of the modern blesbok, and the size of a donkey. Parapliohyrax was seemingly the largest african pliohyracid during the Miocene. A study estimated the size of extinct hyracoids based on the of their dentition and proposed that P. ngororaensis weighed between 33 and 144 kg (73 and 317 lb), a weight similar to the modern warthog.

== Species ==
=== Parapliohyrax mirabilis ===
P. mirabilis is the type species of the genus. Described by Lavocat in 1961, it is known after a fairly complete holotype maxilla, an associated paratype mandible probably coming from the same specimen than the holotype, and several fragmentary and isolated teeth remains. It has been identified in Beni Mellal, Morocco and Kairouan, Tunisia. It is reportedly slightly smaller than P. ngororaensis.

=== Parapliohyrax ngororaensis ===
P. ngororaensis is the largest species of the genus, described in 1987 by Pickford and Fischer, based on KNM BN 1741, a fragmentary skull associated with a damaged mandible. It is known from the Ngorora Formation in Kenya and the Berg Aukas locality in Namibia. P. ngororaensis is known from an abundance of material in the Ngorora Formation, being present in the members B, C, D and E of the formation, with 57 specimens of varying preservation attributed to the species, the remains of crania and mandibles of adults and juveniles being only found in the members C and D. It has been suggested that the Nova Pit metapodial and the Samburu Hills tooth could be attributed to this species, although a lack of better material hinders, for now, this assessment.

=== Tentatively assigned material ===
A fragmentary metapodial identified as a tarsometatarsus from the Nova Pit locality in South Africa has been provisionally referred to P. ngororaensis by Pickford in 2003, this identification being tentative due to the lack of associated material. An additional metapodial, from the Gebel Zelten locality in Libya, has been associated to the Nova material. Indeterminate Parapliohyrax material has also been discovered in the Aït Kandoula Basin in Morocco.

A single isolated premolar, discovered in Miocene rocks of the Namurungule Formation in the Samburu Hills, was formally described by Tsujikawa as belonging to an indeterminate genus and species of Pliohyracidae. Tsujikawa noted the similarities between the Namurungule tooth and those of Parapliohyrax, but opted to describe it as indeterminate due to the paucity of the remains and the need of comparison with European species of Pliohyrax.

== Palaeobiology ==
=== Ontogeny ===
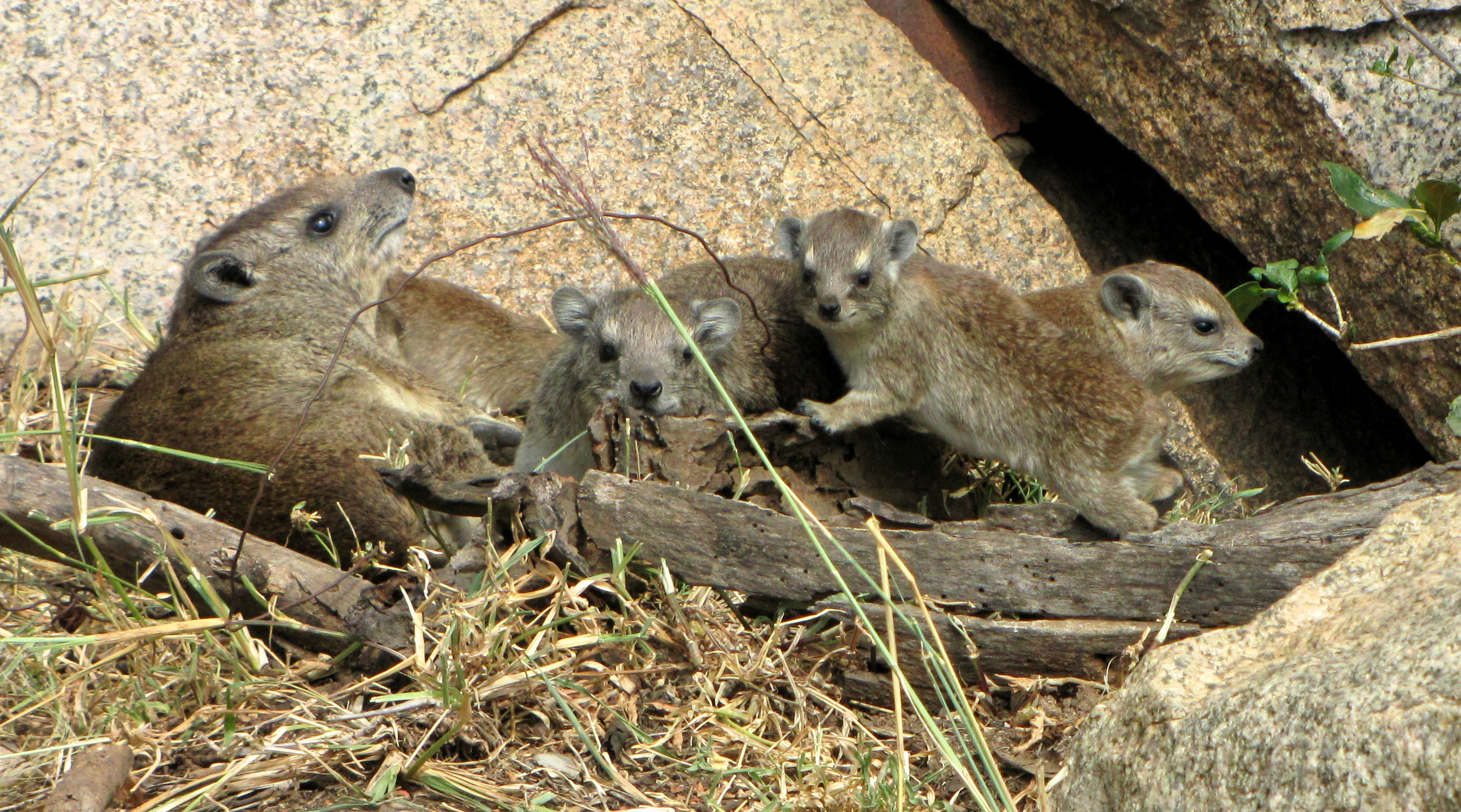
A family of modern yellow-spotted rock hyraxes in Serengeti, with the adult (left) and the youngs (right).

Despite the holotypes of the two species belonging to mature, fully grown individuals, abundant remains of juvenile specimens of both species have been found. The material assigned to the youngs of P. mirabilis, from Beni Melal, consists mostly on deciduous teeth; the first milk incisor of the maxilla was smaller than that of the adults, while the second was noticeably different in shape from its adult counterpart; on the mandible, the first milk incisor was quite similar to the adult form, although smaller, with a lower crown and a root less deep, while the other two were only differentiable from those of the mature individual by their smaller size. The milk canine and premolars were even more molarized than in the adult.

In P. ngororaensis, from the Ngorora Formation, the fossil remains of juveniles are slightly more complete, and includes not only teeth, but cranial remains. The orbits appear to have been placed forward on the face, at the level of the first premolar, in a condition similar to that of modern young hyraxes. During their growth, the toothrow migrate forward, giving the adult a more streamlined profile. Milk teeth have been attributed to juveniles of the species, including incisors, almost completely similar to those of adults except in size, and premolars, noticeably smaller and with a thinner enamel layer.

=== Palaeoenvironment ===
In Beni Mellal, the depositional environments in which the holotype remains of P. mirabilis were recovered correspond to the limestone deposits of an ancient lake. In this environment, the giant hyraxes lived alongside a typical North African Miocene fauna, such as its distant relative the proboscidean Deinotherium, the rhinoceros Paradiceros, the suid Listriodon juba, the giraffid Palaeotragus lavocati and the antelope Benicerus theobaldi, as well as an abundant reptile fauna. Predators in this environment includes various groups of small carnivorans such as Felidae, Viverridae, Mustelidae, the early hyenas Ictitherium and Hyaenictis, and the large bear-dog Agnotherium. In the neighbouring Aït Kandoula Basin, Parapliohyrax sp. is reported from the Afoud A6 locality. The basin represents the remains of a paleolake, and was populated during the Miocene by the horse Hipparion, the giraffid Sivatherium maurusium, the gazelle Gazella, and an indeterminate gomphothere. Parapliohyrax is also reported from Tunisia and Libya, and appears to have been widespread in most of the Maghreb.

In the Ngorora Formation, P. ngororaensis can be found in the members B to E. The formation was deposited, along the slopes of an ancient volcano, by a succession of paleolakes and rivers that provided the freshwater necessary for the gallery forests on the riverside and the lush open woodlands and grasslands of the hinterland. The local fauna was likewise adapted for open environments. The depositional environment of the remains of Parapliohyrax indicates that it mostly lived in low-lying terrains on the shores of Paleolake Ngorora. In the Samburu Hills, the only known specimen of pliohyracid, tentatively attributed to Parapliohyrax, has been found in the Lower Member of the Namurungule Formation.
