= Aspatharia subreniformis =

Conservation status
- Least Concern (IUCN 3.1)

Scientific classification
- Kingdom: Animalia
- Phylum: Mollusca
- Class: Bivalvia
- Order: Unionida
- Family: Iridinidae
- Genus: Aspatharia
- Species: A. subreniformis

Binomial name
- Aspatharia subreniformis (Sowerby, 1867)

Species of bivalve

Aspatharia subreniformis is a species of freshwater mussel in the family Iridinidae. It is endemic to Lake Malawi in Malawi.
