= Aspatharia divaricata =

Conservation status
- Critically endangered, possibly extinct (IUCN 3.1)

Scientific classification
- Kingdom: Animalia
- Phylum: Mollusca
- Class: Bivalvia
- Order: Unionida
- Family: Iridinidae
- Genus: Aspatharia
- Species: A. divaricata

Binomial name
- Aspatharia divaricata (Martens, 1897)

Species of bivalve

Aspatharia divaricata is a species of freshwater mussel in the family Iridinidae. It is endemic to Lake Victoria in Tanzania.
