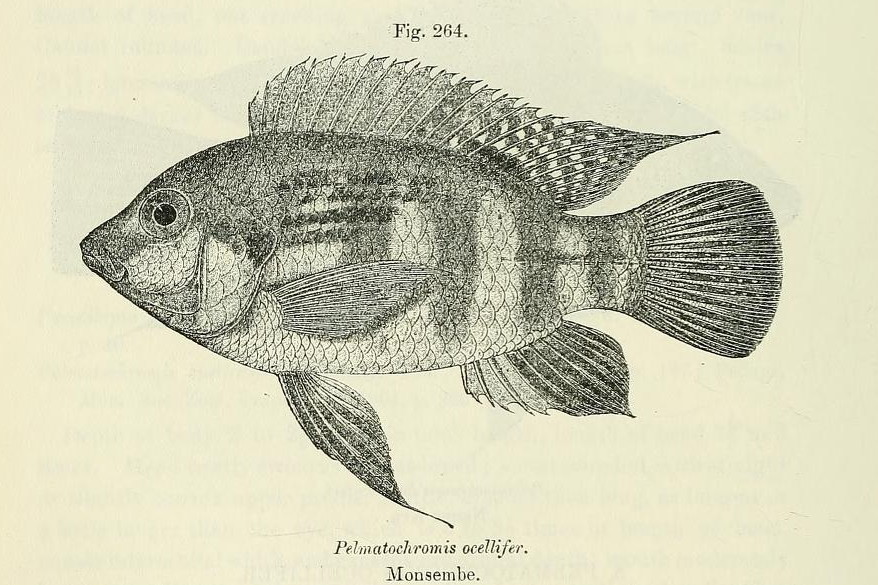

Conservation status
- Data Deficient (IUCN 3.1)

Scientific classification
- Kingdom: Animalia
- Phylum: Chordata
- Class: Actinopterygii
- Order: Cichliformes
- Family: Cichlidae
- Genus: Pelmatochromis
- Species: P. ocellifer

Binomial name
- Pelmatochromis ocellifer Boulenger, 1899

= Pelmatochromis ocellifer =

Species of fish

Pelmatochromis ocellifer is a species of fish belonging to the family Cichildae. The fish is found in the Middle Congo River Basin. The fish is able to grow to 13 centimeters TL long.

== Status ==
As of 2009, the IUCN has listed Pelmatochromis ocellifer as Data Deficient.
