= Pelmatochromis nigrofasciatus =

Conservation status
- Least Concern (IUCN 3.1)

Scientific classification
- Kingdom: Animalia
- Phylum: Chordata
- Class: Actinopterygii
- Order: Cichliformes
- Family: Cichlidae
- Genus: Pelmatochromis
- Species: P. nigrofasciatus

Binomial name
- Pelmatochromis nigrofasciatus (Pellegrin, 1900)

Species of fish

Pelmatochromis nigrofasciatus is a species of fish belonging to the family Cichlide. It is found in the Republic of the Congo, Gabon and in the middle of the Congo River Basin.

== Status ==
As of 2009, the IUCN listed Pelmatochromis nigrofasciatus as Least Concern.
