= Cainochoerinae =

Cainochoerinae Temporal range: 16.9–5.3 Ma

Scientific classification
- Kingdom: Animalia
- Phylum: Chordata
- Class: Mammalia
- Order: Artiodactyla
- Family: Suidae
- Subfamily: †Cainochoerinae; Pickford, 1995

Genera
- Albanohyus; Cainochoerus

Subfamily of mammals

Cainochoerinae is an extinct subfamily of even-toed ungulates that existed during the Miocene and Pliocene in Asia and Africa.

== Genera ==
- †Albanohyus Ginsburg, 1974 Miocene, Europe
- †Cainochoerus Pickford, 1988 - Miocene - Pliocene, Africa
