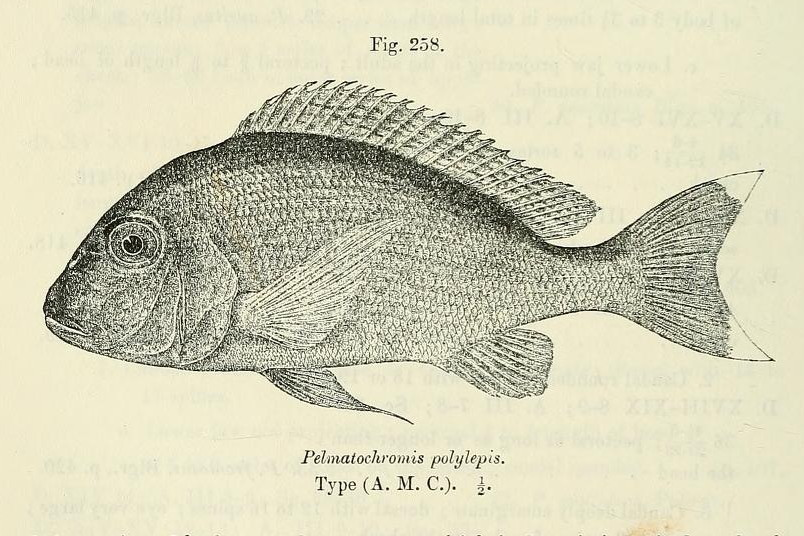

Conservation status
- Least Concern (IUCN 3.1)

Scientific classification
- Kingdom: Animalia
- Phylum: Chordata
- Class: Actinopterygii
- Order: Cichliformes
- Family: Cichlidae
- Genus: Tylochromis
- Species: T. polylepis

Binomial name
- Tylochromis polylepis (Boulenger, 1900)

Synonyms
- Pelmatochromis polylepis Boulenger, 1900

= Tylochromis polylepis =

Species of fish

Tylochromis polylepis is a species of cichlid native to Lake Tanganyika and the Lukuga River, where it is found in swampy habitats. This species can reach a length of 43.5 cm (17.1 in). It can be found in the aquarium trade.
