= Lanistes alexandri =

Conservation status
- Endangered (IUCN 2.3)

Scientific classification
- Kingdom: Animalia
- Phylum: Mollusca
- Class: Gastropoda
- Subclass: Caenogastropoda
- Order: Architaenioglossa
- Family: Ampullariidae
- Genus: Lanistes
- Species: L. alexandri

Binomial name
- Lanistes alexandri Bourguignat, 1850

Species of gastropod

Lanistes alexandri is a species of large freshwater snail, an aquatic gastropod mollusc with a gill and an operculum in the family Ampullariidae, the apple snails.

This species is endemic to Tanzania.
