= Aspatharia =

Scientific classification
- Domain: Eukaryota
- Kingdom: Animalia
- Phylum: Mollusca
- Class: Bivalvia
- Order: Unionida
- Family: Iridinidae
- Genus: Aspatharia; Bourguignat, 1885

Genus of bivalves

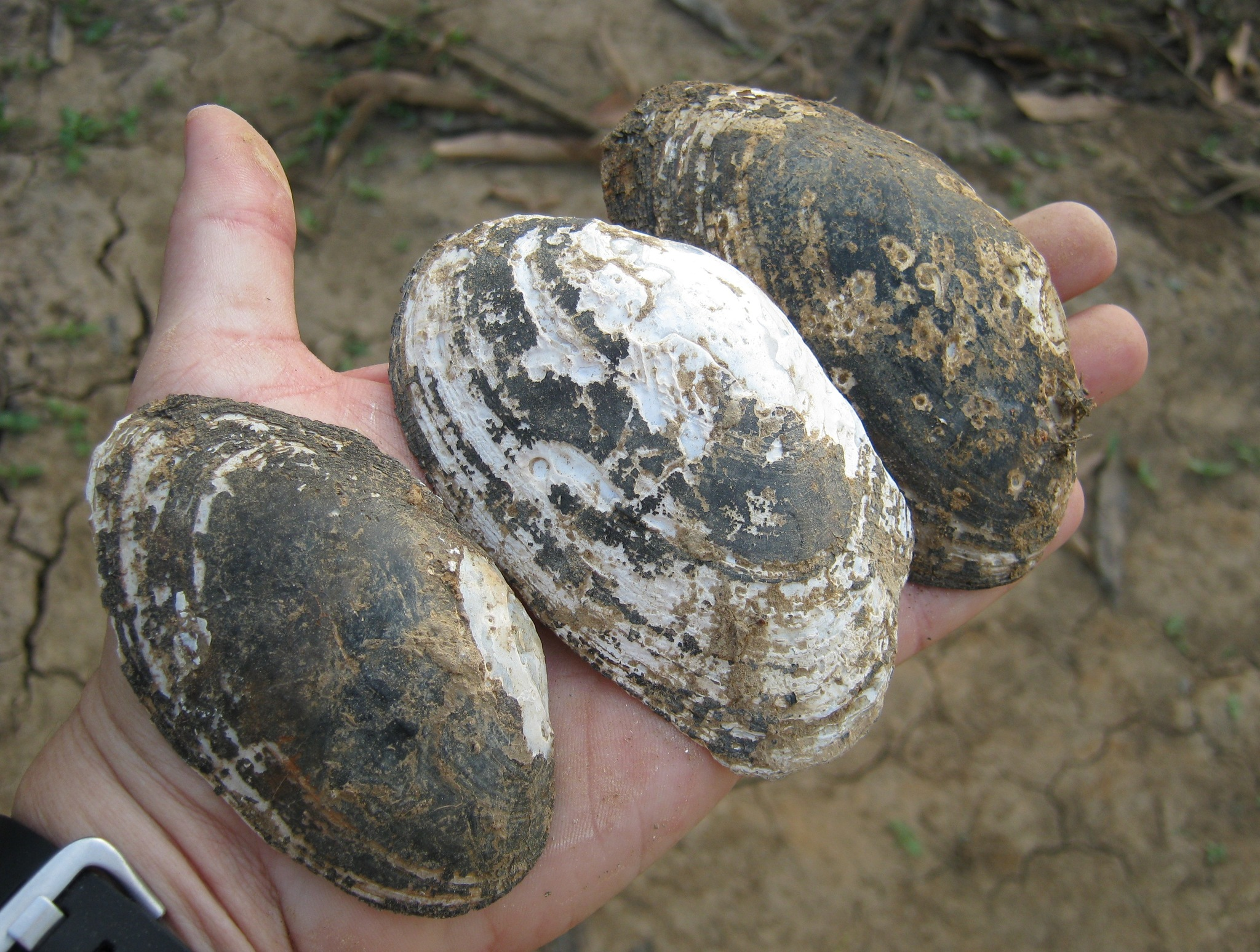
Aspatharia mussels.

Aspatharia is a genus of freshwater mussel, an aquatic bivalve mollusk in the family Iridinidae.

== Species ==
Species within the genus Aspatharia include:

- Aspatharia chaiziana
- Aspatharia dahomeyensis
- Aspatharia divaricata
- Aspatharia droueti
- Aspatharia marnoi
- Aspatharia pangallensis
- Aspatharia pfeifferiana
- Aspatharia rochebrunei
- Aspatharia rugifera
- Aspatharia semicorrugata
- Aspatharia subreniformis
