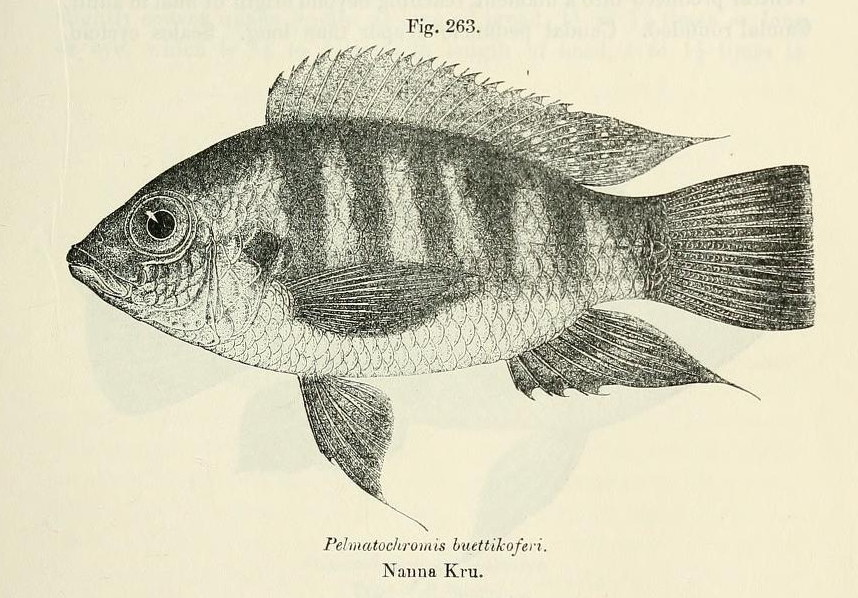
- A depiction of Pelmatochromis buettikoferi

Conservation status
- Least Concern (IUCN 3.1)

Scientific classification
- Kingdom: Animalia
- Phylum: Chordata
- Class: Actinopterygii
- Order: Cichliformes
- Family: Cichlidae
- Genus: Pelmatochromis
- Species: P. buettikoferi

Binomial name
- Pelmatochromis buettikoferi (Steindachner, 1894)

= Pelmatochromis buettikoferi =

Species of fish

Pelmatochromis buettikoferi is a species of fish belonging to the family Cichlidae. It is found in coastal rivers in West Africa from the upper Casamance River in Senegal up to Saint John River in Liberia.

== Status ==
In 2019, the IUCN evaluated Pelmatochromis buettikoferi and listed the species as Least Concern.
