= Lanistes bicarinatus =

Conservation status
- Least Concern (IUCN 3.1)

Scientific classification
- Kingdom: Animalia
- Phylum: Mollusca
- Class: Gastropoda
- Subclass: Caenogastropoda
- Order: Architaenioglossa
- Family: Ampullariidae
- Genus: Lanistes
- Species: L. bicarinatus

Binomial name
- Lanistes bicarinatus Germain, 1907

Species of gastropod

Lanistes bicarinatus is a species of large freshwater snail in the family Ampullariidae, the apple snails. It is endemic to the Democratic Republic of the Congo, where it lives in river habitat. This snail is a common species. It is used locally for animal feed.
