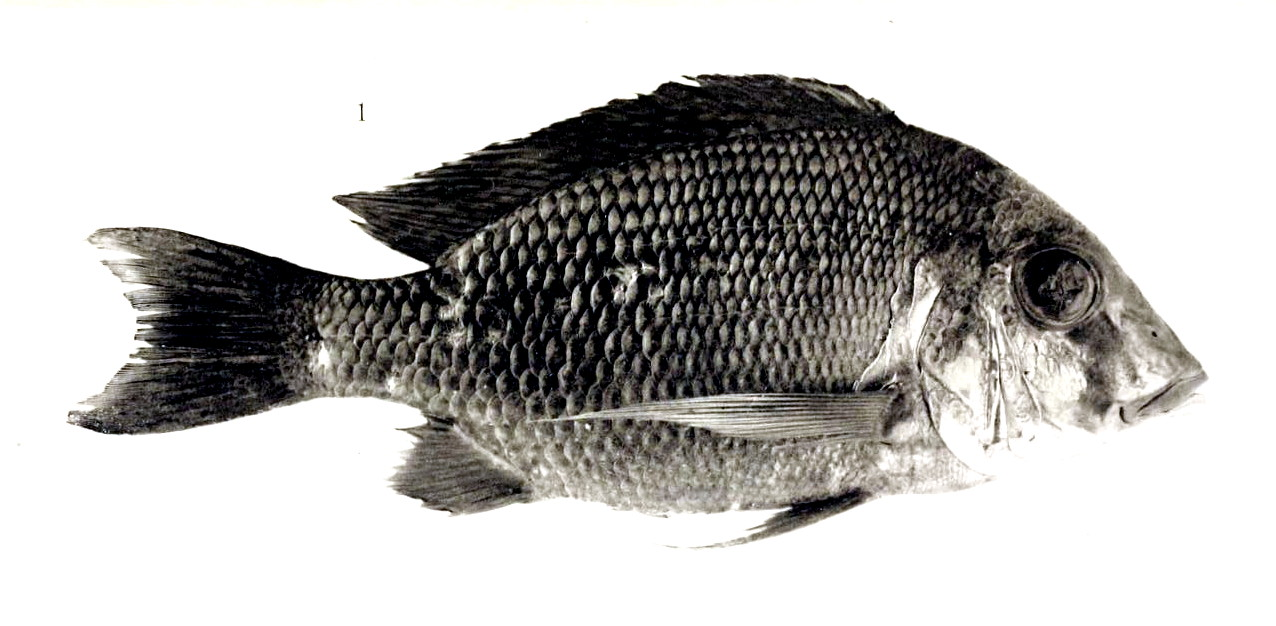

Conservation status
- Least Concern (IUCN 3.1)

Scientific classification
- Kingdom: Animalia
- Phylum: Chordata
- Class: Actinopterygii
- Order: Cichliformes
- Family: Cichlidae
- Genus: Tylochromis
- Species: T. jentinki

Binomial name
- Tylochromis jentinki (Steindachner, 1894)

= Tylochromis jentinki =

Species of fish

Tylochromis jentinki is a species of fish belonging to the Cichlidae family. The species is found in the costal rivers of Gambia to the Tano River in Ghana. The fish maximum length is 27 cm (11 in) long (SL).
