= Afrikanokeryx =

Afrikanokeryx Temporal range: Miocene (Serravallian-Tortonian) ~13-11 Ma

Scientific classification
- Kingdom: Animalia
- Phylum: Chordata
- Class: Mammalia
- Order: Artiodactyla
- Family: Giraffidae
- Genus: †Afrikanokeryx; Harris, Solounias & Geraads, 2010

Type species
- Afrikanokeryx leakeyi Harris, Solounias & Geraads, 2010

Extinct genus of mammals

Afrikanokeryx is an extinct monotypic genus of giraffid artiodactyl, closely related to the modern okapi. It lived during the Miocene period in what is today the Ngorora Formation in Kenya. The name of the only species known, A. leakeyi, honours Louis Leakey.
