= Albanohyus =

Albanohyus Temporal range: 16.9–11.1 Ma

Scientific classification
- Kingdom: Animalia
- Phylum: Chordata
- Class: Mammalia
- Order: Artiodactyla
- Family: Suidae
- Subfamily: †Cainochoerinae
- Genus: †Albanohyus; Ginsburg, 1974

Species
- A. pymaeus; A. castellensis

Extinct genus of mammal

Albanohyus was an extinct genus of even-toed ungulates which lived during the Miocene in Eurasia and possibly Africa.

It is considered an earlier and more primitive relative of Cainochoerus.
