= Chambardia wissmanni =

Conservation status
- Least Concern (IUCN 3.1)

Scientific classification
- Kingdom: Animalia
- Phylum: Mollusca
- Class: Bivalvia
- Order: Unionida
- Family: Iridinidae
- Genus: Chambardia
- Species: C. wissmanni

Binomial name
- Chambardia wissmanni (von Martens, 1883)

Synonyms
- Spatha wissmanni E. von Martens, 1883; Spatha bellamyi Jousseaume, 1886; Spatha oppicata Germain, 1913

Species of bivalve

Chambardia wissmanni is a species of freshwater bivalve in the family Iridinidae. It is widely distributed in the Congo River Basin in Central Africa, extending into West Africa as far as Mali, possibly further. It inhabits rivers and has also been reported from Lake Tanganyika.
