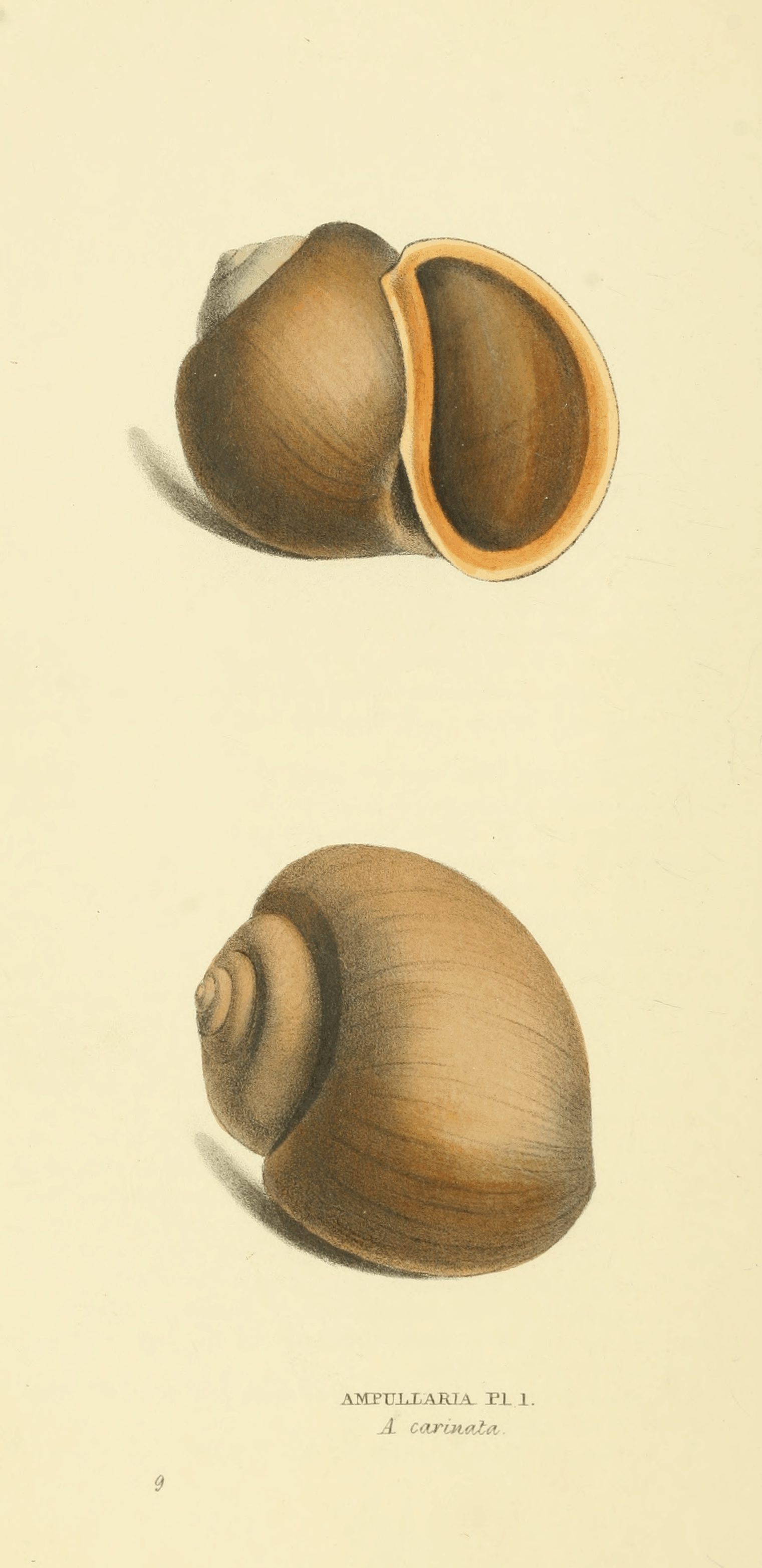
- Lanistes boltenianus shells

Scientific classification
- Kingdom: Animalia
- Phylum: Mollusca
- Class: Gastropoda
- Subclass: Caenogastropoda
- Order: Architaenioglossa
- Family: Ampullariidae
- Genus: Lanistes
- Species: L. boltenianus

Binomial name
- Lanistes boltenianus (Röding, 1798)

Synonyms
- Planorbis boltenianus Röding, 1798; Ampullaria bolteniana (Röding, 1798); Ampullaria carinata (Olivier, 1804); Cyclostoma carinatum Olivier, 1804; Lanistes bolteni [sic]; Lanistes bolteni var. perfecta Pallary, 1909; Lanistes boltenianus var. depressa Nevill, 1885; Lanistes carinatus (Olivier, 1804); Lanistes olivierii Montfort, 1810; Meladomus duveyrierianus Revoil, 1885

= Lanistes boltenianus =

Species of gastropod

Lanistes boltenianus is a species of a freshwater snail, an aquatic gastropod mollusk with a gill and an operculum in the family Ampullariidae, the apple snails.
