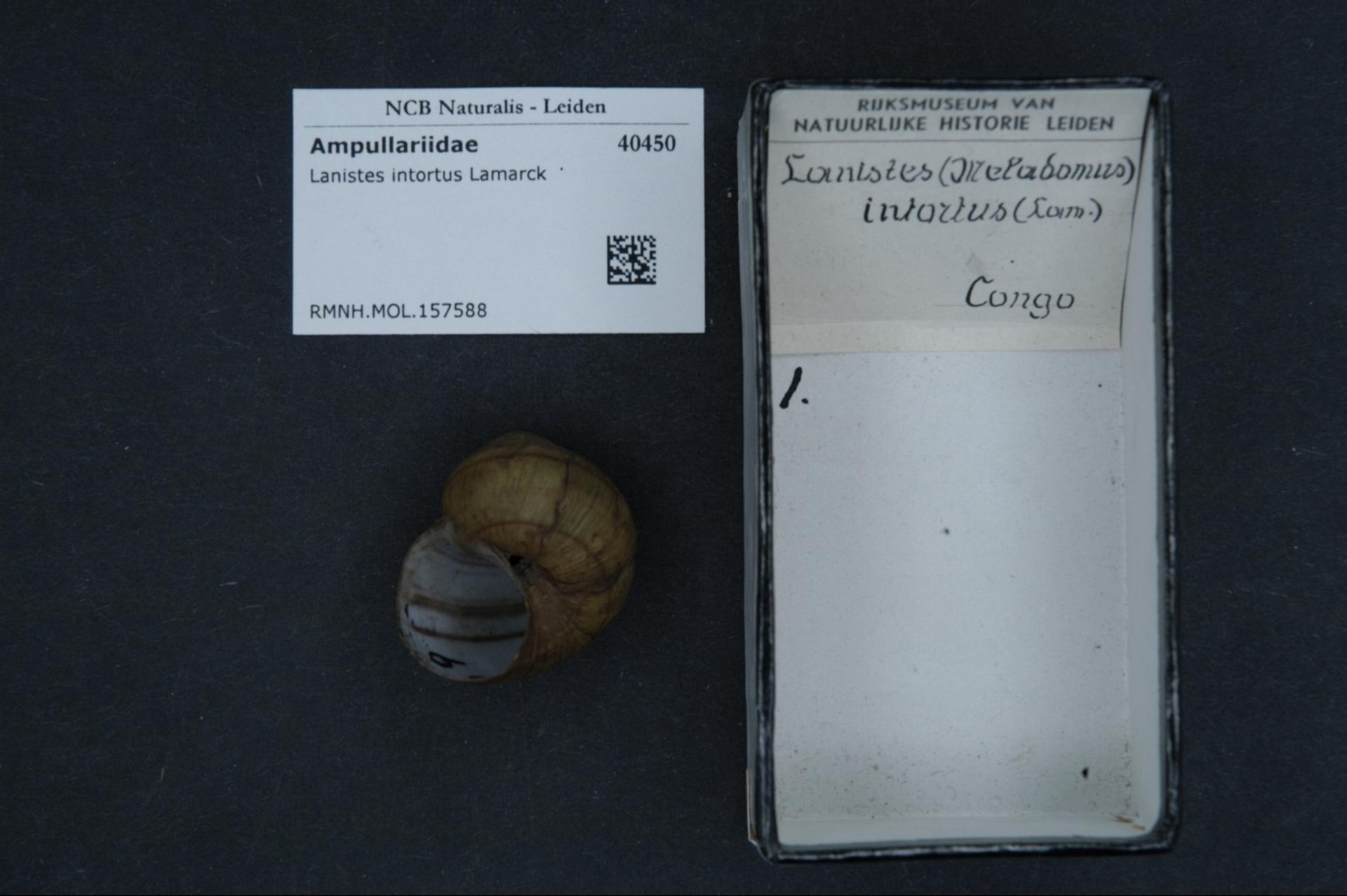
- Lanistes intortus shell

Conservation status
- Least Concern (IUCN 3.1)

Scientific classification
- Kingdom: Animalia
- Phylum: Mollusca
- Class: Gastropoda
- Subclass: Caenogastropoda
- Order: Architaenioglossa
- Family: Ampullariidae
- Genus: Lanistes
- Species: L. intortus

Binomial name
- Lanistes intortus Martens, 1877

= Lanistes intortus =

Species of gastropod

Lanistes intortus is a species of large freshwater snail, an aquatic gastropod mollusk with a gill and an operculum in the family Ampullariidae, the apple snails.

It is endemic to the Democratic Republic of the Congo. They are one of approximately 41 species of Lanistes.

They are typically found at an altitude between 0 and 490 m (1,608 ft), living in and around brackish water habitats. They are characterised by a shell of 30 mm, light brown with small, darker spiral bands.
