= Lanistes neavei =

Conservation status
- Least Concern (IUCN 3.1)

Scientific classification
- Kingdom: Animalia
- Phylum: Mollusca
- Class: Gastropoda
- Subclass: Caenogastropoda
- Order: Architaenioglossa
- Family: Ampullariidae
- Genus: Lanistes
- Species: L. neavei

Binomial name
- Lanistes neavei Melvill & Standen, 1907

Species of gastropod

Lanistes neavei is a species of large freshwater snail, an aquatic gastropod mollusk with a gill and an operculum in the family Ampullariidae, the apple snails.

It is found in the Democratic Republic of the Congo and Zambia.
