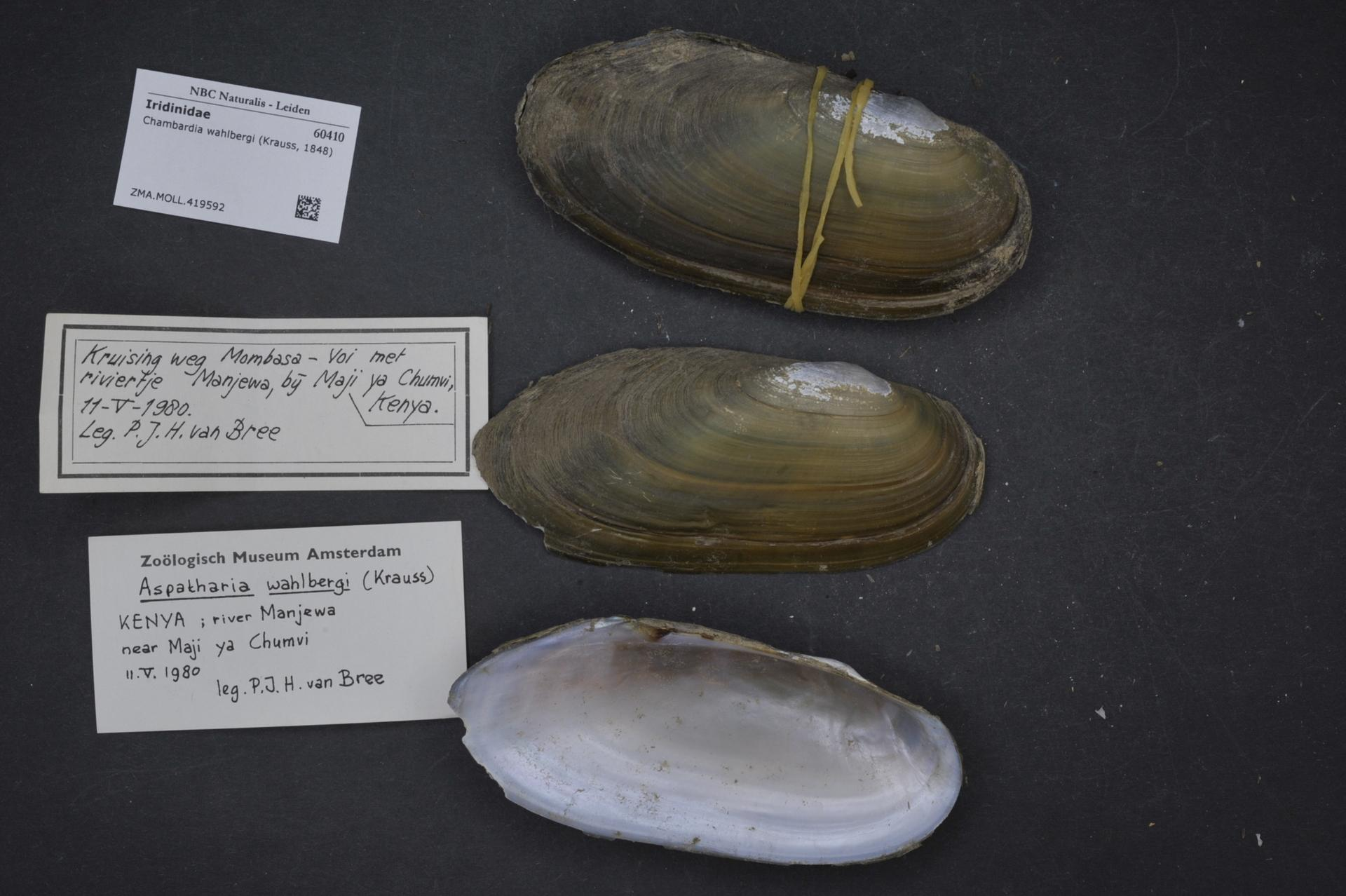

Conservation status
- Least Concern (IUCN 3.1)

Scientific classification
- Kingdom: Animalia
- Phylum: Mollusca
- Class: Bivalvia
- Order: Unionida
- Family: Iridinidae
- Genus: Chambardia
- Species: C. wahlbergi

Binomial name
- Chambardia wahlbergi (Krauss, 1848)

= Chambardia wahlbergi =

Species of bivalve

Chambardia wahlbergi is a species of bivalve belonging to the family Iridinidae.

The species is found in Africa.
