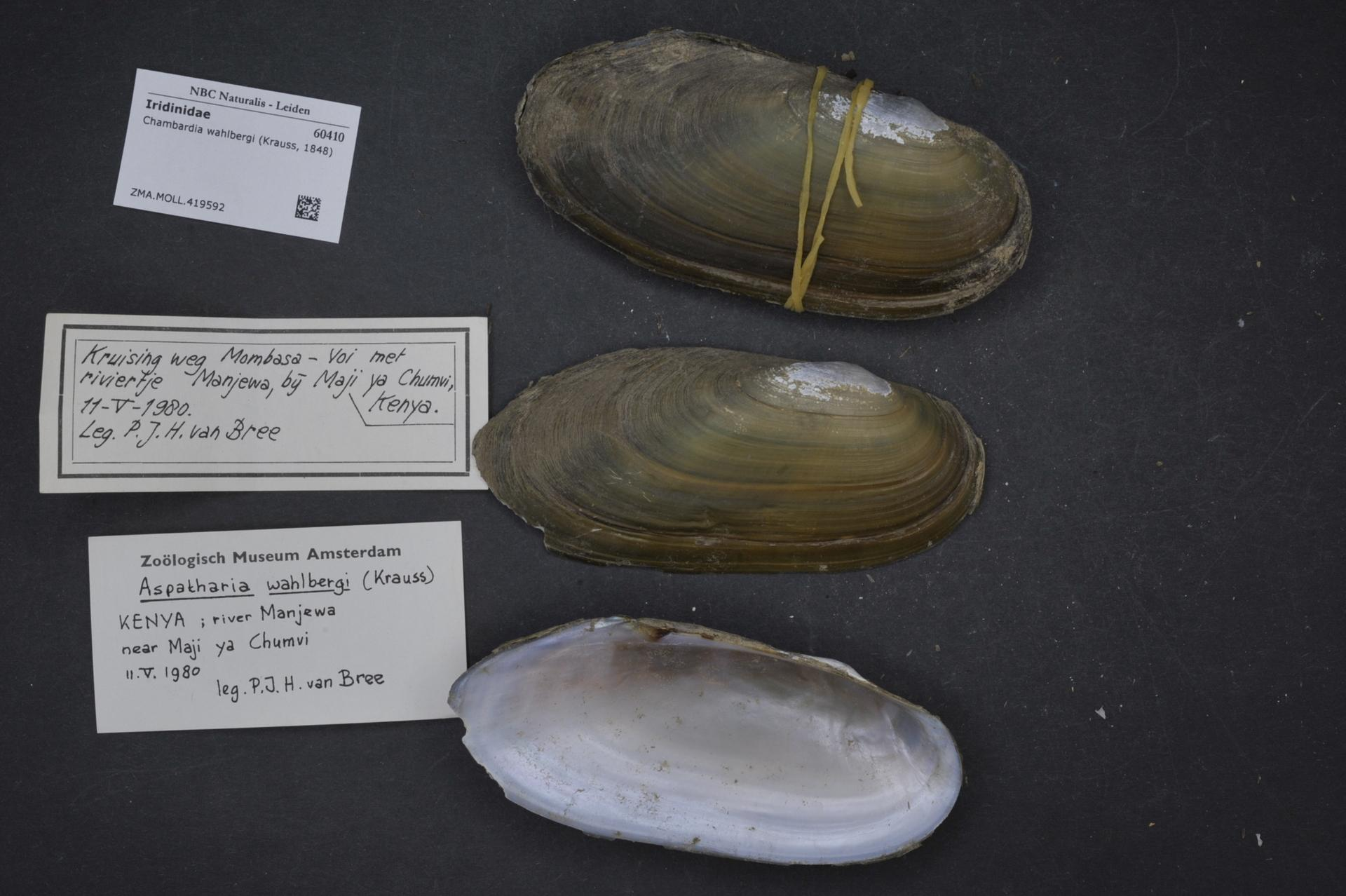
- Chambardia wahlbergi

Scientific classification
- Kingdom: Animalia
- Phylum: Mollusca
- Class: Bivalvia
- Order: Unionida
- Family: Iridinidae
- Genus: Chambardia; Bourguignat, 1891

Synonyms
- Arthropteron Rochebrune, 1904; Leptospatha Rochebrune & Germain, 1904; Mitriodon Rochebrune, 1904; Spathella Bourguignat, 1885; Spathopsis C. T. Simpson, 1900

= Chambardia =

Genus of bivalves

Chambardia is a genus of bivalves belonging to the family Iridinidae.

The species of this genus are found in Africa.

Species:

- Chambardia bourguignati (Bourguignat, 1886)
- Chambardia feibeli Van Bocxlaer & Van Damme, 2009
- Chambardia flava (Pilsbry & Bequaert, 1927)
- Chambardia letourneuxi Bourguignat, 1890
- Chambardia letourneuxi Servain, 1891
- Chambardia moutai (Dartevelle, 1939)
- Chambardia nyassaensis (I.Lea, 1864)
- Chambardia petersi (E.von Martens, 1860)
- Chambardia rubens (Lamarck, 1819)
- Chambardia struckmanni (Modell, 1964)
- Chambardia trapezia (E.von Martens, 1897)
- Chambardia triangulata (Gautier, 1965)
- Chambardia wahlbergi (F.Krauss, 1848)
- Chambardia welwitschii (Morelet, 1867)
- Chambardia wissmanni (E.von Martens, 1883)
