= Tylochromis aristoma =

Conservation status
- Least Concern (IUCN 3.1)

Scientific classification
- Kingdom: Animalia
- Phylum: Chordata
- Class: Actinopterygii
- Order: Cichliformes
- Family: Cichlidae
- Genus: Tylochromis
- Species: T. aristoma

Binomial name
- Tylochromis aristoma Stiassny, 1989

Species of fish

Tylochromis aristoma is a species of fish belonging to the Cichlidae family. The species is restricted to the Ruki River drainage in the middle of the Congo Basin in the Democratic Republic of the Congo. The fish maximum length is 19.3 cm (7.6 in) long (SL).
