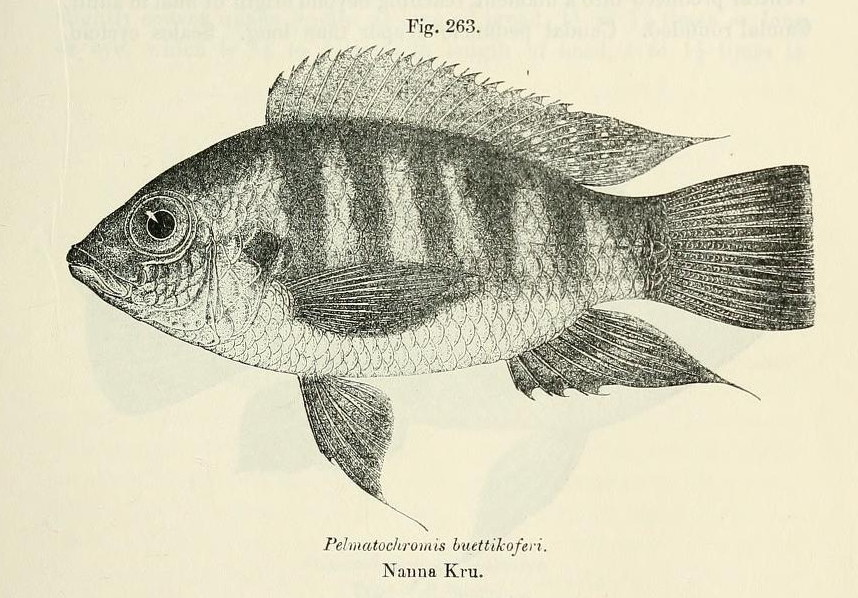
- Pelmatochromis buettikoferi

Scientific classification
- Domain: Eukaryota
- Kingdom: Animalia
- Phylum: Chordata
- Class: Actinopterygii
- Order: Cichliformes
- Family: Cichlidae
- Subfamily: Pseudocrenilabrinae
- Tribe: Pelmatochromini; Greenwood, 1987
- Genus: Pelmatochromis; Steindachner, 1894

Type species
- Paratilapia (Pelmatochromis) buettikoferi Steindachner, 1894

= Pelmatochromis =

Genus of fishes

Pelmatochromis is a small genus of fishes in the cichlid family. Of its three species, two are endemic to the Middle Africa, and one is endemic to tropical West Africa. Depending on the exact species, they reach about 11.5–16.5 centimetres (4.5–6.5 in) in length. This genus is sometimes placed in its own clade, informally referred to as the pelmatochromines, and this as the Pelmatochromini, may be the sister taxon to the Chromidotilapiini.

== Species ==
There are currently three recognized species in this genus:

- Pelmatochromis buettikoferi (Steindachner, 1894)
- Pelmatochromis nigrofasciatus (Pellegrin, 1900)
- Pelmatochromis ocellifer (Boulenger, 1899)
