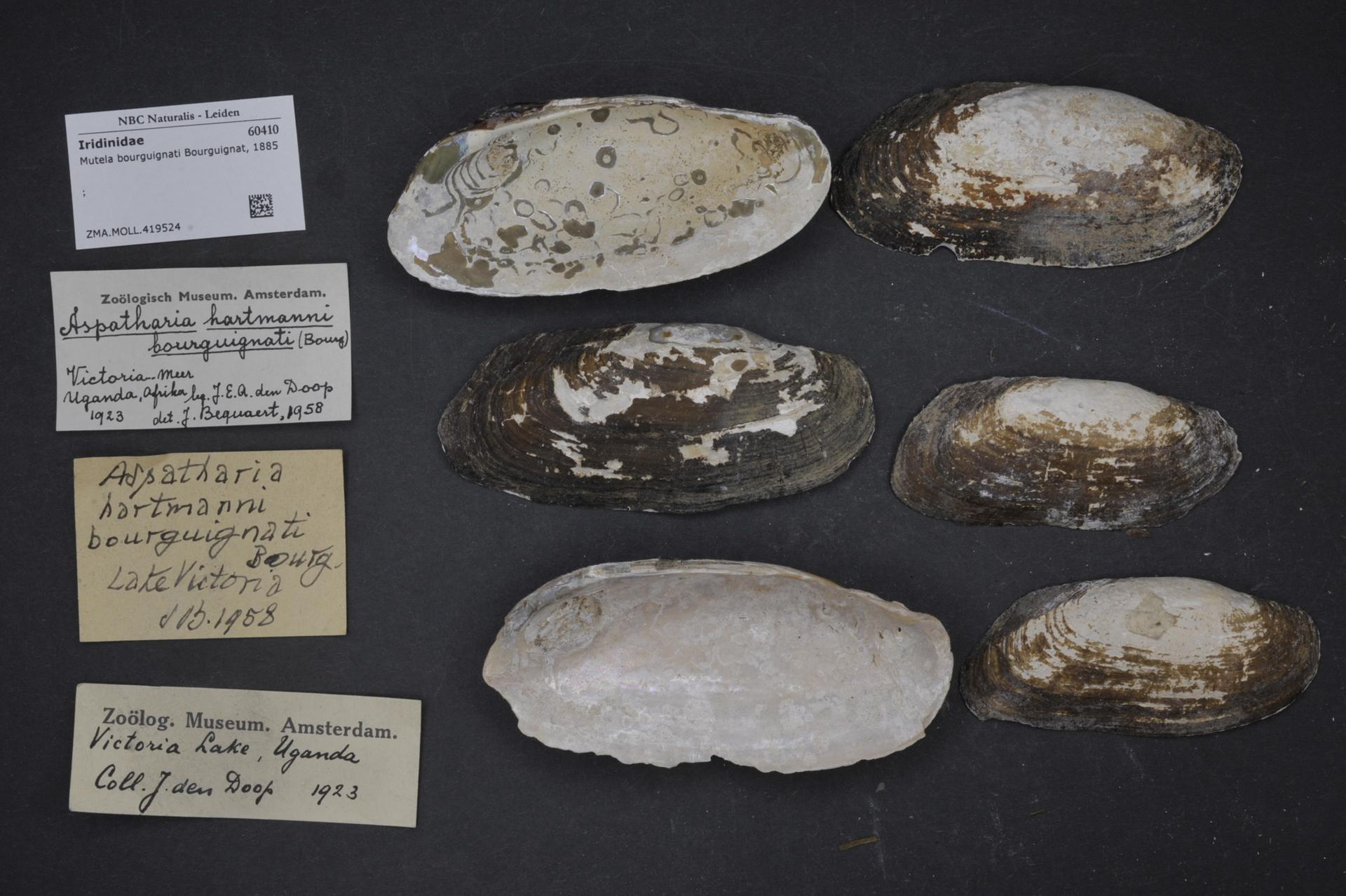
- Mutela bourguignati

Scientific classification
- Domain: Eukaryota
- Kingdom: Animalia
- Phylum: Mollusca
- Class: Bivalvia
- Order: Unionida
- Family: Iridinidae
- Genus: Mutela; Scopoli, 1777

= Mutela =

Genus of bivalves

Mutela is a genus of freshwater mussels, aquatic bivalve mollusks in the family Iridinidae. Species in this genus have actual siphons, rather than unfused apertures, as do most other freshwater mussels.

== Species ==
Species in the genus Mutela include:

- Mutela alata (Lea, 1864)
- Mutela bourguignati
- Mutela dubia
- Mutela legumen
- Mutela nilotica
- Mutela rostrata
