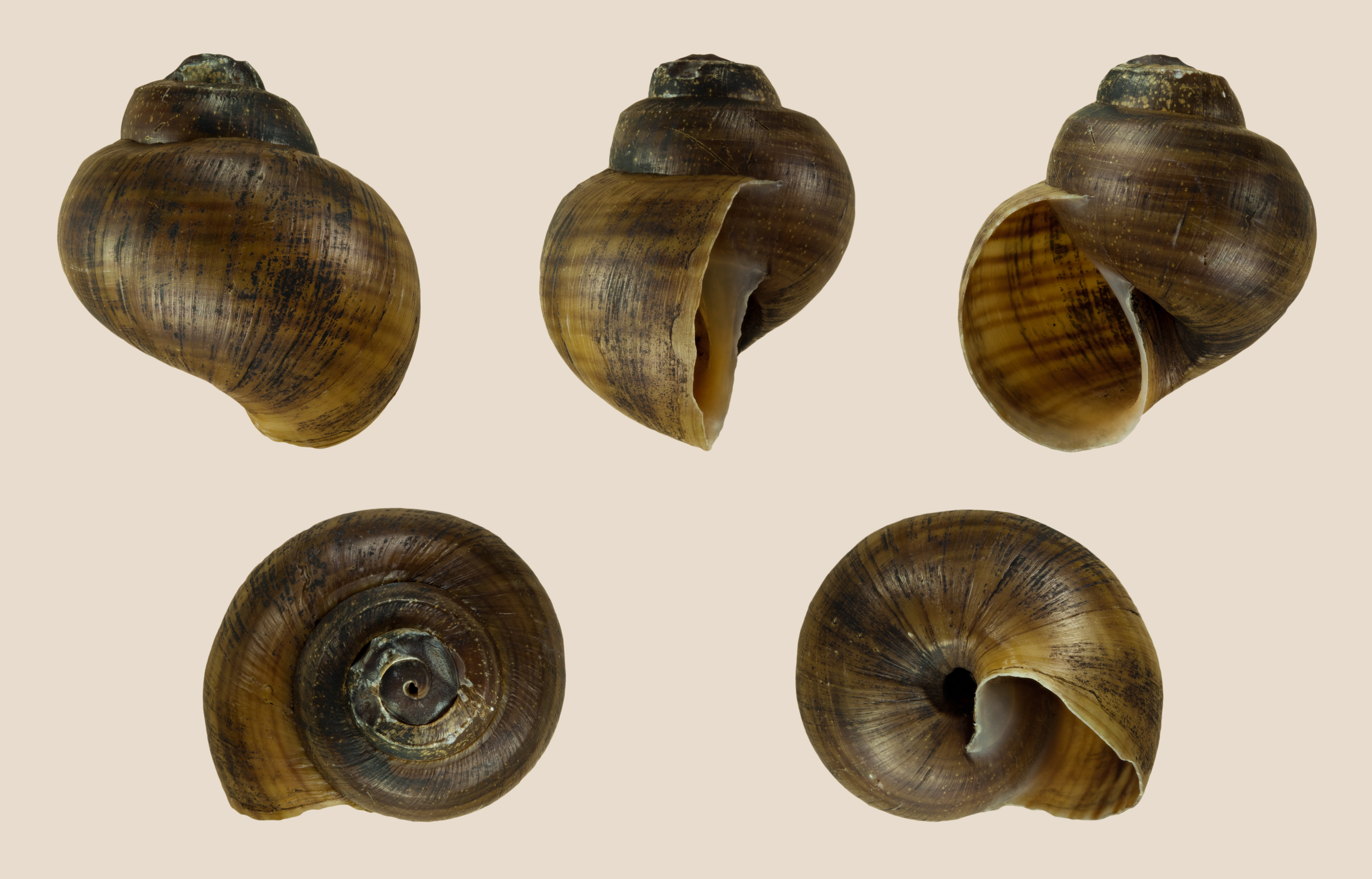
- Lanistes bernardianus (Morelet, 1860)

Scientific classification
- Kingdom: Animalia
- Phylum: Mollusca
- Class: Gastropoda
- Subclass: Caenogastropoda
- Order: Architaenioglossa
- Family: Ampullariidae
- Subfamily: Ampullariinae
- Genus: Lanistes; Montfort, 1810

Type species
- Lanistes carinatus (Olivier, 1804).

Diversity
- 21 extant species and at least 10 fossil species

Synonyms
- Ampullaria (Lanistes); Lanistes (Meladomus) Swainson, 1840; Lanistes (Plesiolanistes) Berthold, 1991; Lanistes (Prolanistes) Schütt in Schütt & Besenecker, 1973 · accepted, alternate representation; Leroya Grandidier, 1887; Meladomus Swainson, 1840; Meladomus (Bolteniana) Bourguignat, 1889; Meladomus (Lanistes); Meladomus (Libyciana) Bourguignat, 1889; Meladomus (Meladomus) Swainson, 1840 (formerly used as subgenus of Lanistes); Meladomus (Nyassana) Bourguignat, 1889; Meladomus (Olivaceana) Bourguignat, 1889; Meladomus (Purpuriana) Bourguignat, 1889

= Lanistes =

Genus of gastropods

Lanistes is a genus of freshwater snails which have a gill and an operculum, aquatic gastropod mollusks in the family Ampullariidae, the apple snails.

== Distribution ==
The distribution of the genus Lanistes includes Africa and Madagascar.

== Description ==
Lanistes has a unique anatomy among the Ampullariidae: it has a "hyperstrophic" sinistral shell. This means that the body of the snail is dextral (as in all other ampullariids), but the shell appears to be sinistral. However the sinistral appearance stems from the fact that the rotation of the shell as it grows is in an upward direction rather than the usual downward direction.

== Species ==
Three subgenera have been recognized, based on shell differences: Lanistes sensu stricto, Meladomus and Leroya. These subgenera are not used in recent works.

Extant species within the genus Lanistes include:

- Lanistes alexandri (Bourguignat, 1889)
- Lanistes ambiguus Martens, 1866
- Lanistes bernardianus (Morelet, 1860)
- Lanistes beseneckeri Schütt in Schütt & Besenecker, 1973 †
- Lanistes bicarinatus Germain, 1907
- Lanistes bloyeti (Bourguignat, 1889)
- Lanistes boltenianus (Röding, 1798) - synonym: Lanistes carinatus (Olivier, 1804)
- Lanistes chaperi (Kobelt, 1912)
- Lanistes ciliatus Martens, 1878
- Lanistes congicus O. Boettger, 1891
- Lanistes deguerryanus (Bourguignat, 1889)
- Lanistes ellipticus Martens, 1866
- Lanistes farleri Craven, 1880
- Lanistes fultoni (Kobelt, 1912)
- Lanistes grasseti (Morelet, 1863)
- Lanistes graueri Thiele, 1911
- Lanistes intortus Martens, 1877
- Lanistes jouberti (Bourguignat, 1888)
- Lanistes letourneuxi (Bourguignat, 1879)
- Lanistes libycus (Morelet, 1848)
  - Lanistes libycus var. albersi
  - Lanistes libycus form bernardianus or as Lanistes bernardianus (Morelet, 1860)
- Lanistes magnus Furtado, 1886
- Lanistes nasutus Mandahl-Barth, 1972
- Lanistes neavei Melvill & Standen, 1907
- Lanistes neritoides Brown & Berthold, 1990
- Lanistes nitidissimus (Bourguignat, 1889)
- Lanistes nsendweensis (Dupuis & Putzeys, 1901)
- Lanistes nyassanus Dohrn, 1865
- Lanistes ovatus (Olivier, 1804)
- Lanistes ovum Peters in Troschel, 1845 - synonyms: Lanistes magnus Furtado; Lanistes olivaceus (Sowerby); Lanistes procerus; Lanistes elatior Martens, 1866; Lanistes ovum bangweolicus Haas, 1936; Lanistes connollyi Pain, 1954 Lanistes ovum adansoni; Lanistes olivaceus var. ambiguus
- Lanistes palustris (Morelet, 1864)
- Lanistes pfeifferi (Bourguignat, 1879)
- Lanistes pilsbryi Walker, 1925
- Lanistes pseudoceratodes (Wenz, 1928)
- Lanistes purpureus (Jonas, 1839)
- Lanistes solidus Smith, 1877
- Lanistes stuhlmanni Martens, 1897
- Lanistes varicus (Müller, 1774) - synonyms: Lanistes adansoni Kobelt, 1911; Lanistes millestriatus Pilsbry & Bequaert, 1927

Fossil species within the genus Lanistes include:

- † Lanistes asellus van Damme & Pickford, 1995
- † Lanistes bishopi Gautier
- † Lanistes gautieri van Damme & Pickford, 1995
- † Lanistes gigas van Damme & Pickford, 1995
- † Lanistes hadotoi van Damme & Pickford, 1995
- † Lanistes heynderycxi van Damme & Pickford, 1995
- † Lanistes nkondoensis van Damme & Pickford, 1995
- † Lanistes olukaensis
- † Lanistes senuti van Damme & Pickford, 1995
- † Lanistes trochiformis van Damme & Pickford, 1995
