= Udunga =

Udunga Удунга
- Ulus
- Location within Republic of Buryatia Location within Russia
- Coordinates: 51°07′N 105°58′E
- Country: Russia
- Region: Republic of Buryatia
- District: Selenginsky District
- Time zone: UTC+8:00

Udunga (Russian: Удунга; Buryat: Үдэнгэ, Üdenge) is a rural locality (an ulus) in Selenginsky District, Republic of Buryatia, Russia. The population was 76 as of 2010. There are 4 streets.

== Geography ==
Udunga is located 80 km southwest of Gusinoozyorsk (the district's administrative centre) by road. Ust-Urma is the nearest rural locality.
