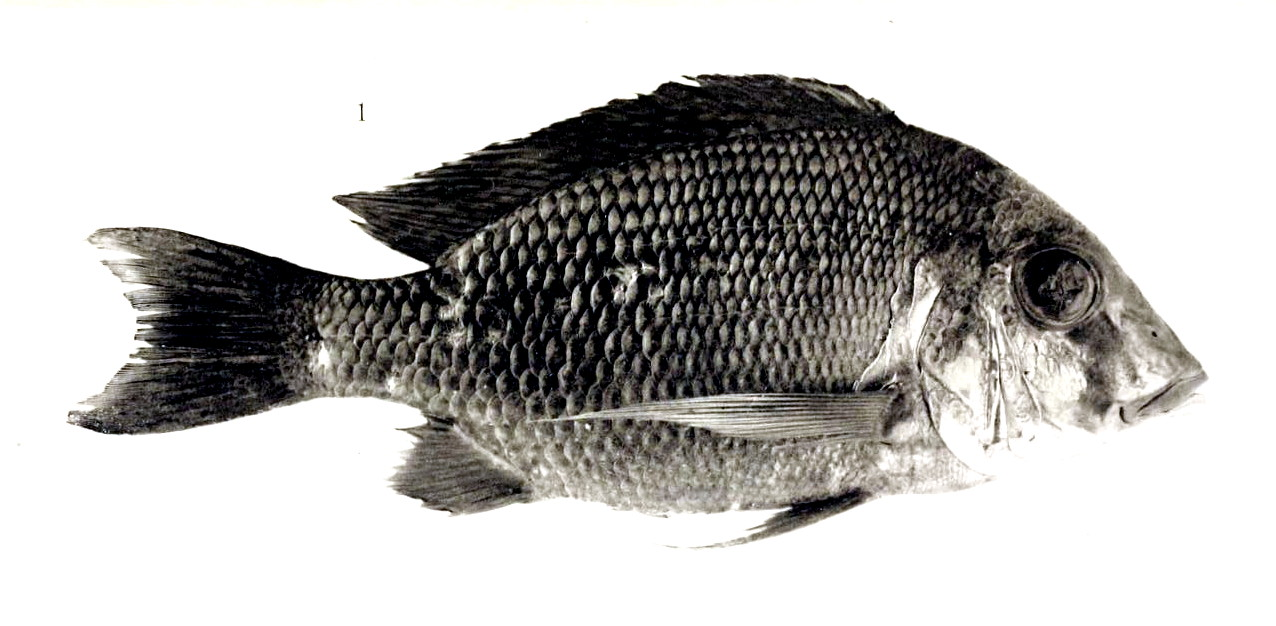
- Tylochromis jentinki

Scientific classification
- Kingdom: Animalia
- Phylum: Chordata
- Class: Actinopterygii
- Order: Cichliformes
- Family: Cichlidae
- Subfamily: Pseudocrenilabrinae
- Tribe: Tylochromini
- Genus: Tylochromis; Regan, 1920

Type species
- Paratilapia (Pelmatochromis) jentinki Steindachner, 1895

= Tylochromis =

Genus of fishes

Tylochromis is a genus of African fishes in the family Cichlidae. They are the only members of the tribe Tylochromini. Many of the species are endemic to the Congo River Basin, but species also are found in Lake Tanganyika, Cameroon, Nigeria, and West Africa from Ghana to Gambia.

== Species ==
The 18 recognized species in this genus are:

- Tylochromis aristoma Stiassny, 1989
- Tylochromis bangwelensis Regan, 1920 (hump-backed bream)
- Tylochromis elongatus Stiassny, 1989
- Tylochromis intermedius (Boulenger, 1916)
- Tylochromis jentinki (Steindachner, 1894)
- Tylochromis labrodon Regan, 1920
- Tylochromis lateralis (Boulenger, 1898)
- Tylochromis leonensis Stiassny, 1989
- Tylochromis microdon Regan, 1920
- Tylochromis mylodon Regan, 1920 (mweru hump-backed bream)
- Tylochromis polylepis (Boulenger, 1900)
- Tylochromis praecox Stiassny, 1989
- Tylochromis pulcher Stiassny, 1989
- Tylochromis regani Stiassny, 1989
- Tylochromis robertsi Stiassny, 1989
- Tylochromis sudanensis Daget, 1954
- Tylochromis trewavasae Stiassny, 1989
- Tylochromis variabilis Stiassny, 1989
