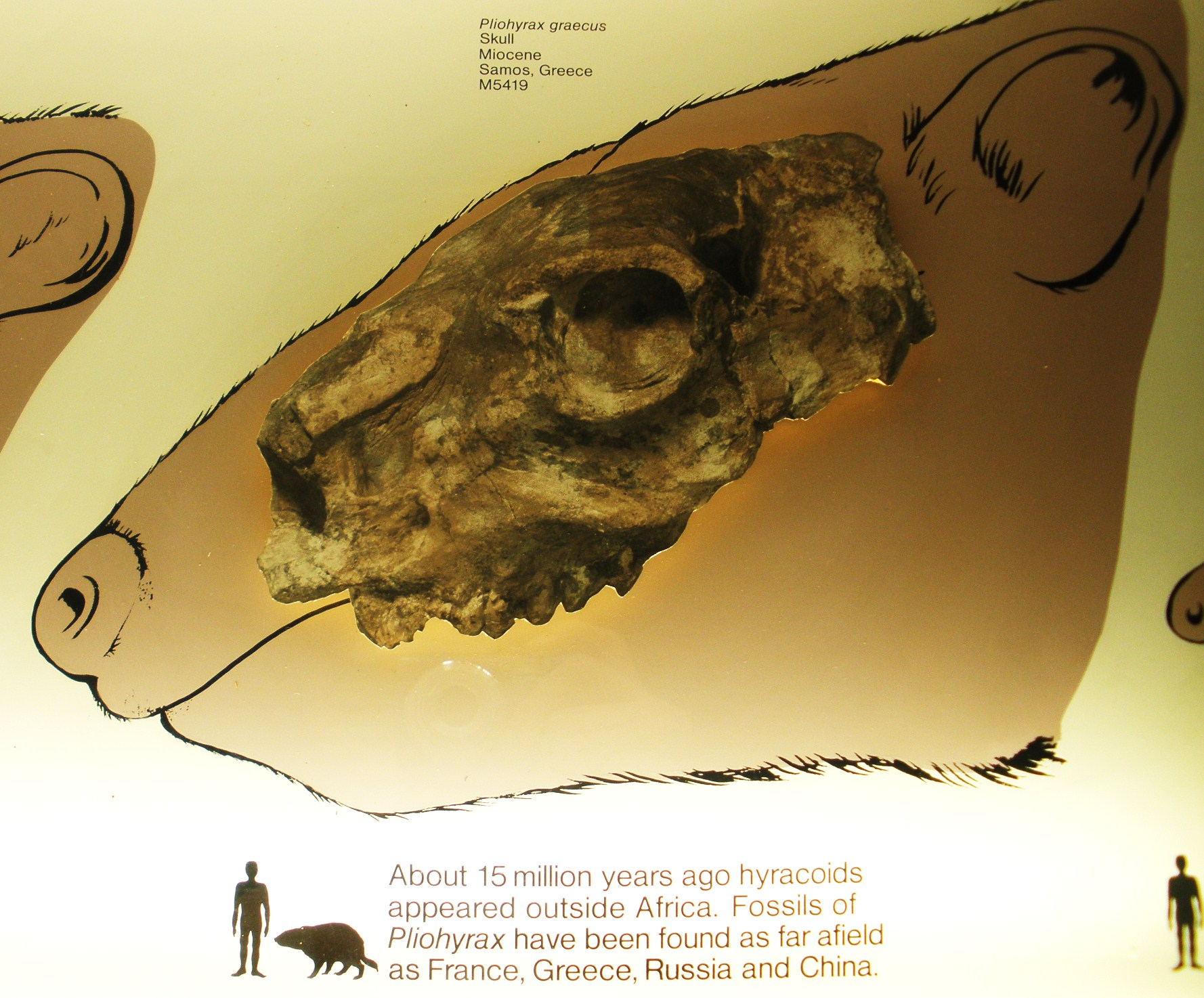
- Pliohyrax graecus
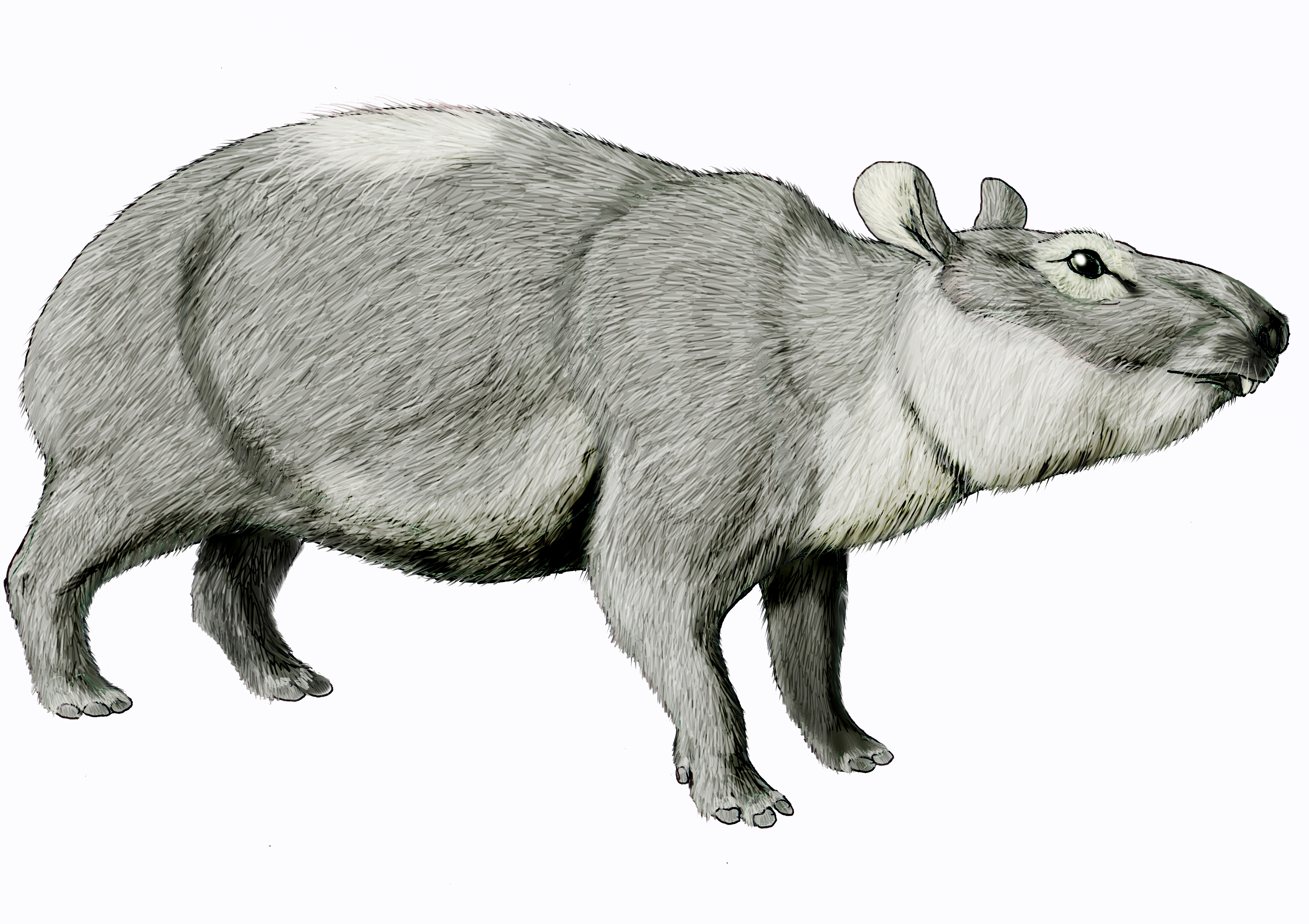
- Life restoration

Scientific classification
- Kingdom: Animalia
- Phylum: Chordata
- Class: Mammalia
- Order: Hyracoidea
- Family: †Pliohyracidae
- Subfamily: †Pliohyracinae
- Genus: †Pliohyrax; Osborn, 1899

Species
- †P. graecus (Gaudry, 1862); †P. rossignoli (Viret, 1947); †P. occidentalis (Viret & Thenius, 1952)

Synonyms
- Sogdohyrax Dubrovo, 1978

= Pliohyrax =

Pliohyrax Temporal range: Miocene–Pliocene

Extinct genus of mammals

Pliohyrax, is a genus of hyracoids (the cavy-like group of animals most closely related to elephants and manatees). It grew to sizes greatly exceeding those of any living hyrax, though it was by no means the largest member of this family.

Fossils of this Miocene-Pliocene herbivore have been found in Afghanistan, France, and Turkey. In Spain, Pliohyrax graecus is among the large mammals species found in the Almenara site, deposited during the Messinian salinity crisis, together with Macaca sp., Bovidae indet., cf. Nyctereutes sp., and Felidae indet.

== Palaeoecology ==
Dental microwear of the boar-sized Pliohyrax graecus from the fossil sites of Pikermi and Samos in Greece indicates that this species had a grazing diet.
