= Cainochoerus =

Cainochoerus Temporal range: Late Miocene - Early Pliocene 11.608–5.3 Ma

Scientific classification
- Kingdom: Animalia
- Phylum: Chordata
- Class: Mammalia
- Order: Artiodactyla
- Family: Suidae
- Subfamily: †Cainochoerinae
- Genus: †Cainochoerus; Pickford, 1988
- Species: †C. africanus

Binomial name
- †Cainochoerus africanus Hendey, 1976

Synonyms
- Pecarichoerus

Extinct genus of mammal

Cainochoerus was an extinct genus of even-toed ungulates which lived during the Miocene and Pliocene in Africa. Fossils have been found in Kenya, Ethiopia and South Africa.

Cainochoerus was a very small, cursorial pig. It was originally described as a species of peccary based on its simple single-cusped premolars. Among the living pigs, the small pygmy hog can be considered an analogue.
