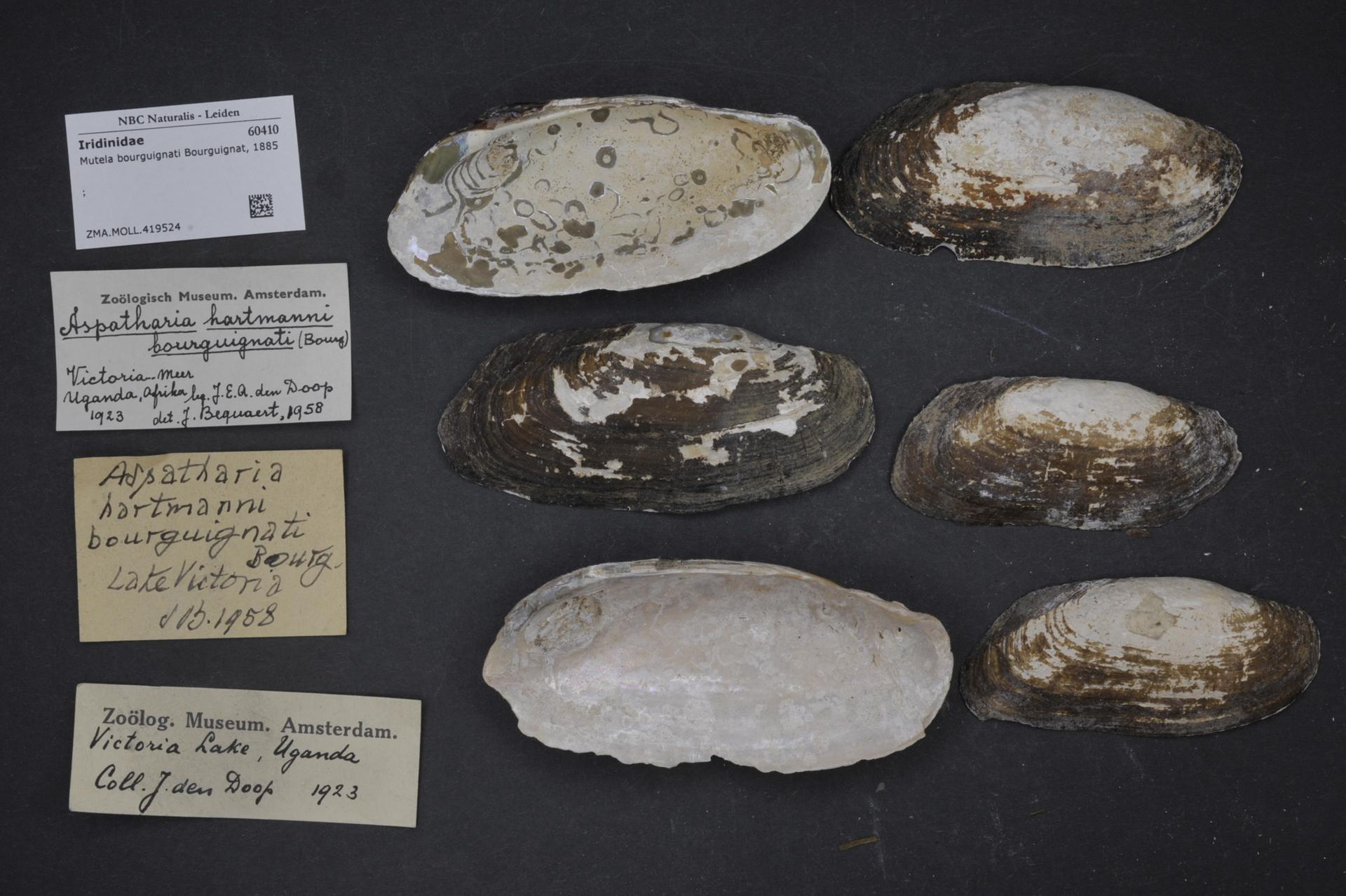

Scientific classification
- Kingdom: Animalia
- Phylum: Mollusca
- Class: Bivalvia
- Order: Unionida
- Superfamily: Etherioidea
- Family: Iridinidae; Swainson, 1840

Genera
- 7, See text

Synonyms
- Mutelidae Gray, 1847; Pleiodontidae Rochebrune, 1904

= Iridinidae =

Family of bivalves

Iridinidae is a family of medium-sized freshwater mussels, aquatic bivalve mollusks in the order Unionida.

== Genera ==
Genera within the family Iridinidae:

- Aspatharia Bourguignat, 1885 (monotypic)
- Chambardia Bourguignat, 1891
  - Chambardia bozasi
  - Chambardia hartmanni
  - Chambardia nyassaensis
  - Chambardia rubens
  - Chambardia trapezia
  - Chambardia wahlbergi
  - Chambardia wissmanni
- Chelidonopsis Ancey, 1887
- Iridina Lamarck, 1819
  - Iridina exotica Lamarck, 1819
  - Iridina ovatus Swainson, 1823
- Moncetia Bourguignat, 1886
- Mutela Scopoli, 1777
- Pleiodon Conrad, 1834
