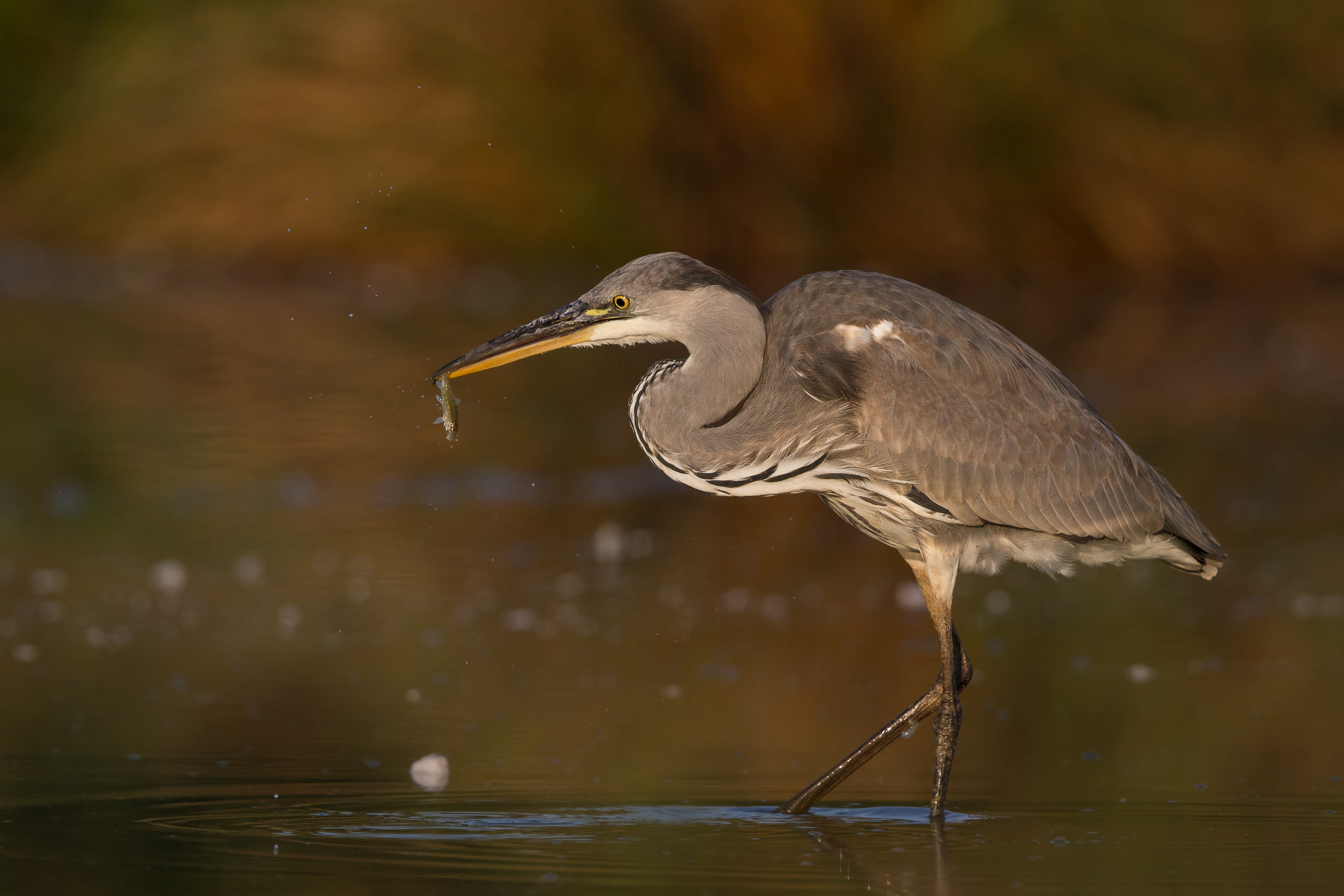
- Grey heron (Ardea cinerea)
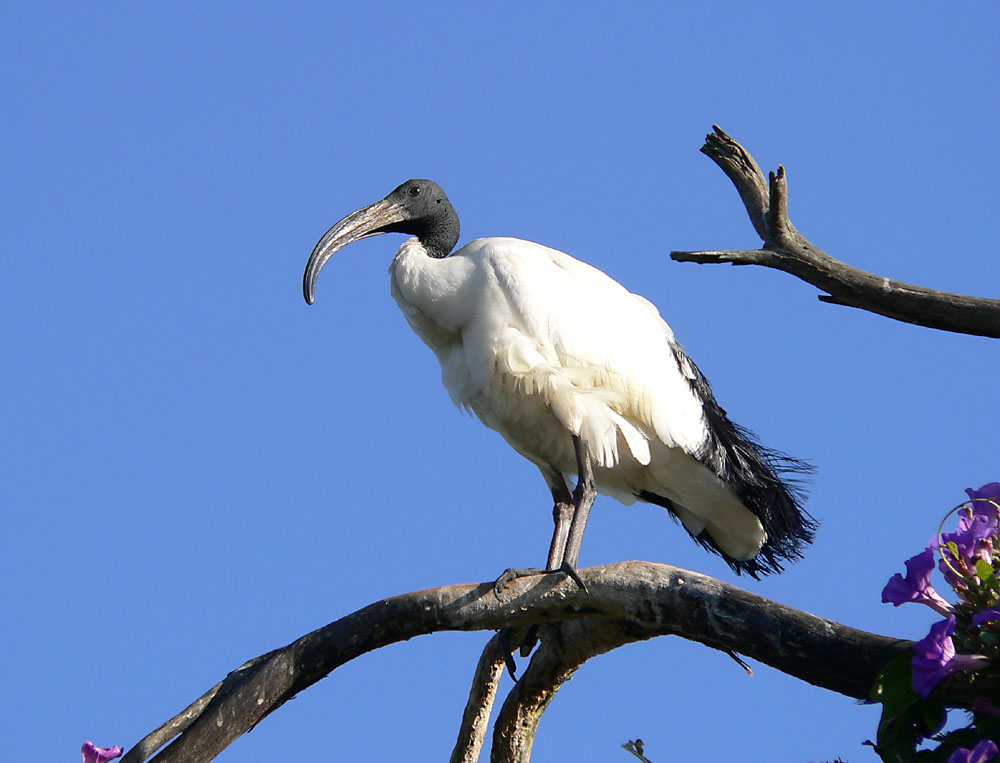
- Sacred ibis (Threskiornis aethiopicus)

Scientific classification
- Kingdom: Animalia
- Phylum: Chordata
- Class: Aves
- Order: Pelecaniformes
- Suborder: Ardei; Wagler, 1830

Families
- Threskiornithidae; †Xenerodiopidae; Ardeidae

= Ardei =

Ardei Temporal range: Eocene–recent, 56–0 Ma

Suborder of birds

Ardei is a possibly-paraphyletic suborder of order Pelecaniformes that include the families Ardeidae (herons, egrets, and bitterns) and Threskiornithidae (ibises and spoonbills). Traditionally the ardeids and threskiornithids were classified in the order Ciconiiformes along with Ciconiidae (storks), Phoenicopteridae (flamingos), Scopidae (hamerkop), Balaenicipitidae (shoebill), and even Cathartidae (New World vultures and condors). However, there were some osteological studies that have questioned the monophyly of Ciconiiformes, suggesting that the ardeids and threskiornithids originated from early gruiforms, with the latter being a transitionary taxon to order Charadriiformes. The non-monophyletic nature of Ciconiiformes is supported by recent genomic studies that have found support for threskiornithids, ardeids, scopids and balaenicipitids being closely related to Pelecanidae (pelicans).

The exact relationship between ardeids, threskiornithids and suborder Pelecani is still being investigated with two hypotheses. One hypothesis is ardeids and threskiornithids are each other's sister taxon in suborder Ardei (as presented here). The other hypothesis is the ardeids are the sister taxon to the pelecanid-related clade, with threskiornithids the basal most group. This hypothesis is supported from some morphological and the earliest representations of non-threskiornithid pelecaniforms come from the Oligocene deposits in Africa, while threskiornithids have been found in Eocene deposits of North America and Europe.
