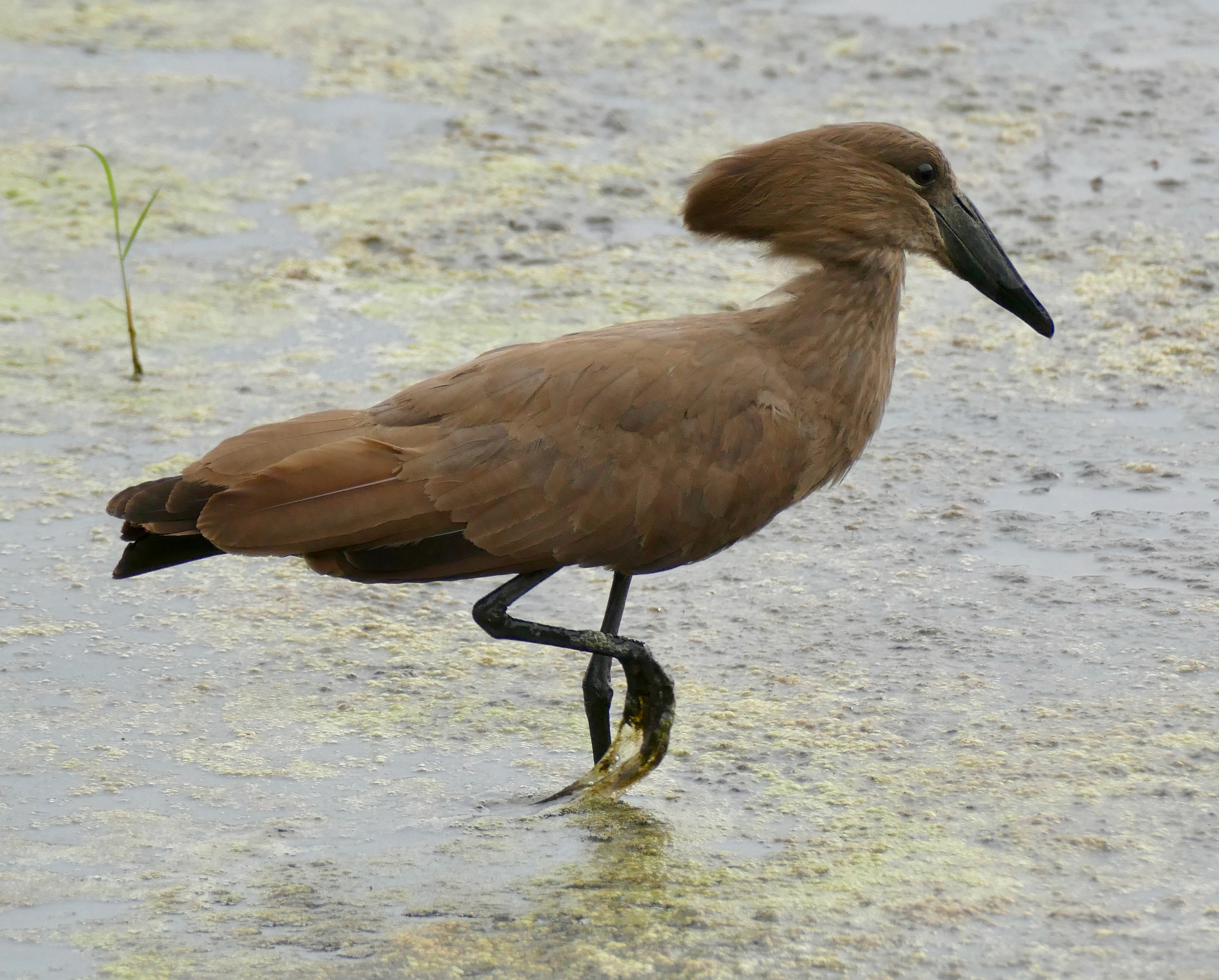
- Hamerkop (Scopus umbretta)

Scientific classification
- Domain: Eukaryota
- Kingdom: Animalia
- Phylum: Chordata
- Class: Aves
- Order: Pelecaniformes
- Suborder: Pelecani

Families
- Scopidae; Balaenicipitidae; Pelecanidae

= Pelecani =

Suborder of birds

Pelecani is a suborder of birds in the order Pelecaniformes. It consists of shoebills, hamerkops, pelicans and their extinct relatives. It is likely the sister clade to herons, though it could also be sister to Ardei
