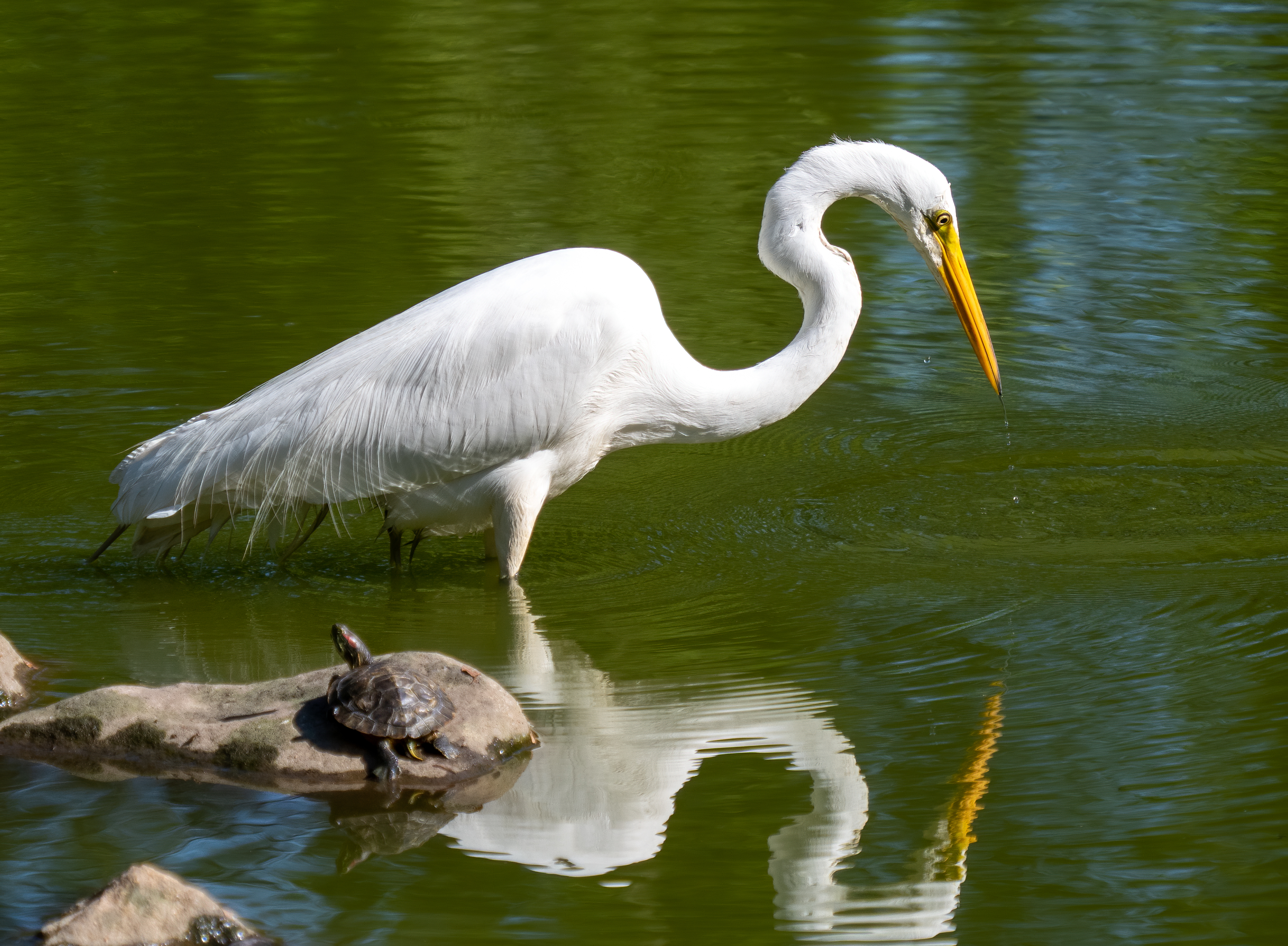
- Great egret (Ardea alba)

Scientific classification
- Kingdom: Animalia
- Phylum: Chordata
- Class: Aves
- Infraclass: Neognathae
- Clade: Neoaves

Groups included
- Always included: Phoenicopteriformes; Phoenicopteridae; Ciconiiformes; Ciconiidae; Pelecaniformes; Threskiornithidae; Ardeidae; Scopidae; Balaenicipitidae; Usually included: Gruiformes; Aramidae; Gruidae; Sometimes included: Anseriformes; Anhimidae; Eurypygiformes; Eurypygidae

= Wading bird =

Wading birds

Group of semi-aquative birds

Wading birds, also known in North America as waders, (Note: Elsewhere in the world, "wader" is used to refer to what North Americans call a "shorebird") are members of several families of long-legged birds found in semi-aquatic ecosystems. Wading birds are not a monophyletic group and different authors classify different families as wading birds. The classification always includes the families Phoenicopteridae (flamingos), Ciconiidae (storks), Threskiornithidae (ibises and spoonbills), Ardeidae (herons, egrets, and bitterns), and the extralimital families Scopidae (hamerkop) and Balaenicipitidae (shoebill) of Africa. These were once classified together in the order Ciconiiformes based on overall similarity in anatomy and ecology, as well as some molecular data. However recent genomic studies have found that this group to be polyphyletic, with flamingos being more closely related to grebes while ibises, herons, the hamerkop and the shoebill are more closely related to pelicans. As a result of these changes flamingos are placed in their own order Phoenicopteriformes and Ciconiiformes are solely restricted to the storks. The rest of the waders have been reclassified into the order Pelecaniformes.

Other families that may be classified as wading birds include Gruidae (cranes) and Aramidae (limpkin). Unlike the previously mentioned families, cranes and the limpkin were never thought to be closely related to the heron-like birds and have always been classified as members of the order Gruiformes. Sunbitterns, the only member of the family Eurypygidae in the order Eurypygiformes, may also be considered to be a wading bird. In addition, the Anhimidae (screamers) of the order Anseriformes may be classified as wading birds. They are commonly found wading in open marshes and weedy lakes.

== External works ==
- Life histories of North American shore birds, Part 1 (of 2) (1962) by A.C. Bent through Dover Publications, Inc. at New York.
