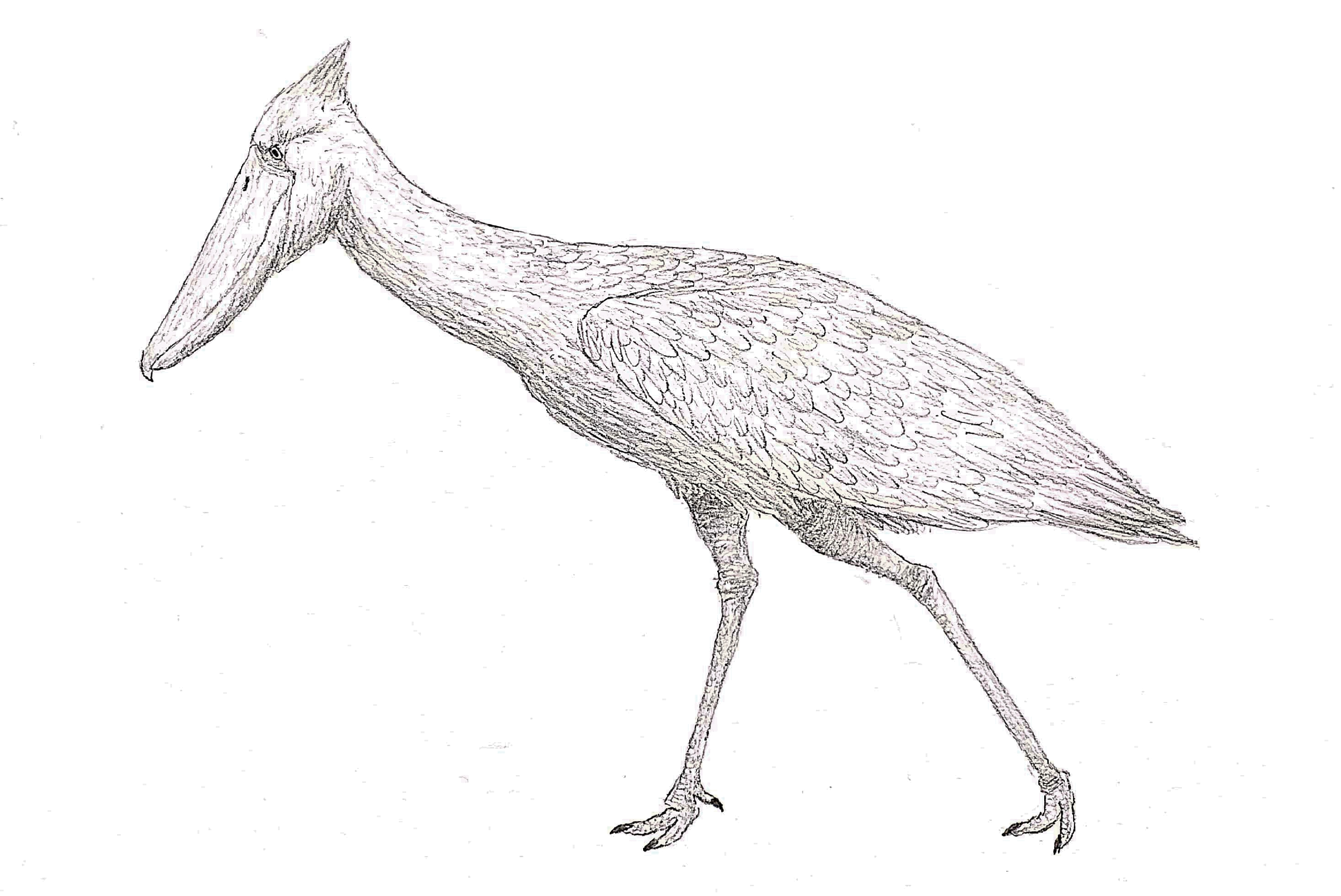
- Speculative life restoration reconstructed after modern shoebill

Scientific classification
- Kingdom: Animalia
- Phylum: Chordata
- Class: Aves
- Order: Pelecaniformes
- Family: Balaenicipitidae
- Genus: †Goliathia; Lambrecht, 1930
- Species: †G. andrewsii

Binomial name
- †Goliathia andrewsii Lambrecht, 1930

= Goliathia =

Goliathia Temporal range: 33–28 Ma

Extinct species of bird

Goliathia is an extinct genus of bird from the Early Oligocene. The holotype is an ulna recovered from lower beds of the Jebel Qatrani Formation in Faiyum Governorate, Egypt. Initially thought to be a heron, an additional bone, a tarsometatarsus, showed this bird to be closely related to the living shoebill. Its full name is Goliathia andrewsii, but may be closely related enough to be classed within the same genus as the living species. The ancient habitat was likely a thickly vegetated freshwater swamp, with this species and a fossil jacana, as well as lungfish and catfish recovered from it. The same size as the living shoebill, it likely ate lungfish and catfish.

== Sources ==
- The Origin and Evolution of Birds by Alan Feduccia, ISBN 978-0300078619
