= Xenerodiops =

Xenerodiops Temporal range: Oligocene, 33 Ma

Scientific classification
- Kingdom: Animalia
- Phylum: Chordata
- Class: Aves
- Order: Pelecaniformes
- Family: †Xenerodiopidae; Rasmussen et al., 1987
- Genus: †Xenerodiops; Rasmussen et al., 1987
- Species: †X. mycter

Binomial name
- †Xenerodiops mycter Rasmussen et al., 1987

Extinct genus of birds

Xenerodiops is a genus of extinct birds, containing one species, Xenerodiops mycter. Its fossil remains were found in Egypt by Elwyn L. Simons and first formally described in 1987. It lived in the Oligocene (about 33 million years ago). It has been placed in its own family, Xenerodiopidae; the alternative view is that this family is synonymous with Ardeidae, the herons.

== Description ==
The only known fossil remains of this animal are an incomplete beak (rostrum) and a left humerus, which allowed a reconstruction of its possible appearance. The dimensions had to be slightly larger than those of a current heron, and its appearance was relatively different due to the strange beak which was rather short, heavy and curved upwards, different from that of any other form of heron according to Rasmussen et al. The humerus was stout enough to suggests that this animal was of a robust structure. The lifestyle of this mysterious bird is not clear: the rostrum was very mobile and it seems that the animal was able to exercise a powerful bite.

== Taxonomy ==
When first described in 1987 as Xenerodiops mycter, the species was placed in a new genus, Xenerodiops, and a new family, Xenerodiopidae. The genus name is formed from the Greek xenos, stranger, erodios, heron, and ops, here meaning resemblance. The species name mycter is from the Greek mykter, nose. Despite the scarcity of fossil remains, the describers considered this species to be related to the herons, family Ardeidae. At the time, herons were placed in the order Ciconiiformes, known to be paraphyletic. The order has since been split, with herons placed in Pelecaniformes.

Jiří Mlíkovský compared X. mycter with Zeltornis ginsburgi, found in Miocene deposits in Libya. He considered that they might be the same species, although this could not be settled as they were described from different fossilized parts. However, he did synonymize the family Xenerodiopidae with Ardeidae, partly on the grounds that the unusually shaped rostrum was similar to those of other members of the subfamily Nycticoracinae.

== Distribution and habitat ==
Xenerodiops mycter was found in Egypt, but may be the same species as one found in Libya. It lived in a tropical climate, surrounded by swamps.
