= Paludiavis =

Paludiavis Temporal range: 11.6–5.3 Ma

Scientific classification
- Kingdom: Animalia
- Phylum: Chordata
- Class: Aves
- Order: Pelecaniformes
- Family: Balaenicipitidae
- Genus: †Paludiavis; Harrison & Walker, 1982
- Species: †P. richae

Binomial name
- †Paludiavis richae Harrison & Walker, 1982

Extinct genus of birds

Paludiavis is a genus of extinct waterbirds in the Balaenicipitidae family. It was described from fossil tarsometatarsus pieces, one found in the Upper Miocene series of the Shivalik Formation in northern Pakistan and the other, a 1972 find that is also from the Upper Miocence, of Tunisia, referred by Colin Harrison and Cyril Walker to the same genus. The genus consists of only one species, Paludiavis richae.
