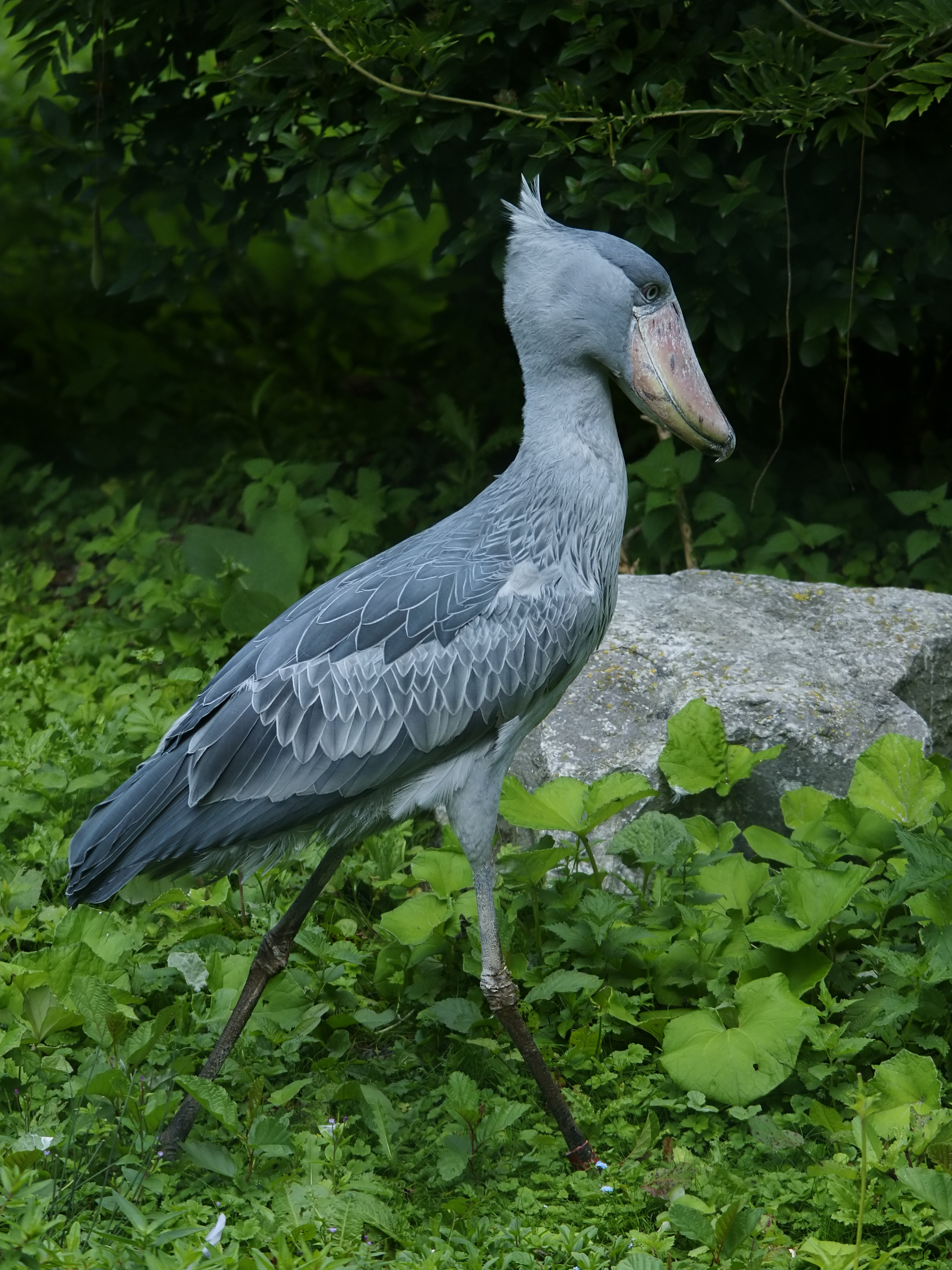
- Shoebill (Balaeniceps rex)

Scientific classification
- Kingdom: Animalia
- Phylum: Chordata
- Class: Aves
- Order: Pelecaniformes
- Suborder: Pelecani
- Family: Balaenicipitidae; Bonaparte, 1853

Genera
- Balaeniceps; †Goliathia; †Paludiavis

= Balaenicipitidae =

Family of birds

Balaenicipitidae is a family of birds in the order Pelecaniformes, although it was traditionally placed in Ciconiiformes. The shoebill is the sole extant species and its closest relative is the hamerkop (Scopus umbretta), which belongs to another family. Species from the Ciconiiformes and Balaenicipitidae family have been found in Kenya, Uganda, Tanzania, and parts of East Africa.

It has the following genera:

- Balaeniceps
- †Goliathia (might belong in Balaeniceps)
- †Paludiavis

== Common characteristics ==
- A sharp hooked tip to the upper beak
- A furrow in the upper beak below the nasal openings
- An ossified septum
- Vestigial or absent expansor secundariorum muscle
