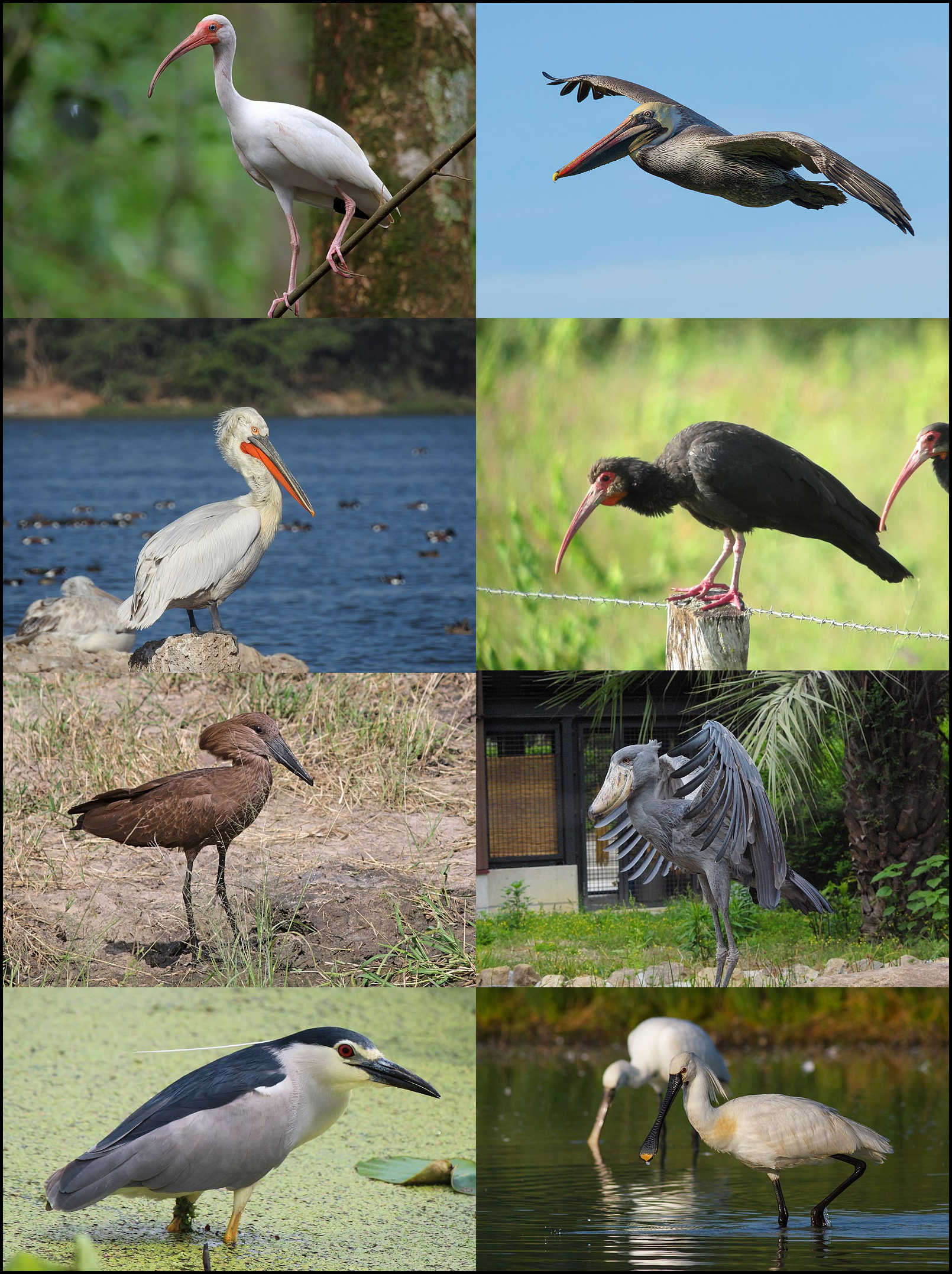

Scientific classification
- Kingdom: Animalia
- Phylum: Chordata
- Class: Aves
- Clade: Pelecanes
- Order: Pelecaniformes; Sharpe, 1891

Suborder and Families
- Threskiornithidae; Ardeidae; Pelecani; Scopidae; Balaenicipitidae; Pelecanidae

= Pelecaniformes =

Pelecaniformes Temporal range: Late Eocene – Holocene, 37.17–0 Ma Possible an early origin based on molecular clock

Order of birds

The Pelecaniformes /pɛlɪˈkænɪfɔːrmiːz/ are an order of medium-sized and large waterbirds found worldwide. As traditionally (but erroneously) defined, they encompass all birds that have feet with all four toes webbed. Hence, they were formerly also known by such names as totipalmates or steganopods. Under this obsolete definition, the Fregatidae (frigatebirds), Sulidae (gannets and boobies), Phalacrocoracidae (cormorants and shags), Anhingidae (darters), and Phaethontidae (tropicbirds) were included in the Pelecaniformes. Subsequent molecular and morphological studies indicate they are in fact not close relatives to "true" Pelecaniformes, and they are now placed in their own orders, Suliformes and Phaethontiformes, respectively.

Pelecaniformes as currently defined comprise the pelicans, shoebill and hamerkop, which form a clade within the order (suborder Pelecani), along with herons (Ardeidae) and ibises and spoonbills (Threskiornithidae); the relationships between Pelecani and the other two families are still being debated by taxonomists.

Most have a bare throat patch (gular skin), and the nostrils have evolved into dysfunctional slits, forcing them to breathe through their mouths. They also have a pectinate (comb-like) nail on their longest toe, which is used to brush out and separate their feathers. They feed on fish, squid, and other aquatic animals. Nesting is colonial, but the individual birds are monogamous, pairing up to rear their respective clutches. These birds lack a brood patch. The young are altricial, hatching from the egg helpless and naked in most species.

== Systematics and evolution ==
Classically, bird relationships were based solely on morphological characteristics. The Pelecaniformes were traditionally, but erroneously, defined as birds that have feet with all four toes webbed (totipalmate), as opposed to all other birds with webbed feet where only three of four were webbed. Hence, they were formerly also known by such names as totipalmates or steganopodes. The group included frigatebirds, gannets, cormorants, anhingas, and tropicbirds.

Research from the beginning of the 21st century strongly suggested that the similarities between this traditional definition of Pelecaniformes are the result of convergent evolution rather than common descent, being adaptations that were converged upon by birds living in and near aquatic environments; the traditional definition of the group would thus be polyphyletic.

Sibley and Ahlquist's landmark DNA–DNA hybridisation studies (now known as the Sibley–Ahlquist taxonomy) led to them placing the families traditionally contained within the Pelecaniformes together with the grebes, cormorants, ibises and spoonbills, New World vultures, storks, penguins, albatrosses, petrels, and loons together as a subgroup within a greatly expanded order Ciconiiformes, a radical move which by now has been all but rejected: their "Ciconiiformes" merely assembled all early advanced land- and seabirds for which their research technique delivered insufficient phylogenetic resolution.

Morphological study had suggested pelicans are sister to a gannet-cormorant clade, yet genetic analysis groups them with the hamerkop and shoebill, though the exact relationship between the three is unclear. Mounting evidence pointed to the shoebill as a close relative of pelicans. This also included microscopic analysis of eggshell structure by Konstantin Mikhailov in 1995, who found that the shells of pelecaniform eggs were covered in a thick microglobular material; importantly, the eggs of shoebills have these structures, but not those of the tropicbirds. Reviewing genetic evidence to date, Cracraft and colleagues surmised that pelicans were sister to the shoebill with the hamerkop as the next earlier offshoot. Ericson and colleagues sampled five nuclear genes in a 2006 study spanning the breadth of bird lineages, and came up with pelicans, shoebill and hamerkop in a clade. Hackett and colleagues sampled 32 kilobases of nuclear DNA and recovered shoebill and hamerkop as sister taxa, pelicans sister to them, and herons and ibises as sister groups to each other, with the heron and ibis group a sister to the pelican/shoebill/hamerkop clade. The phylogenetic tree below illustrates this situation:

- Pelecaniformes
  - Ardei
    - Threskiornithidae – ibises, spoonbills (36 species)
    - Ardeidae – herons, bitterns (72 species)
  - Pelecani
    - Pelecanidae – pelicans (8 species)
    - - Scopidae – hamerkop
      - Balaenicipitidae – shoebill

The current International Ornithological Committee classification has pelicans grouped with the shoebill (Balaenicipitidae), hamerkop (Scopidae), ibises and spoonbills (Threskiornithidae), and herons, egrets and bitterns (Ardeidae). The IOC considers Threskiornithidae and Ardeidae to from a clade, citing Hackett et al. 2008.

Another hypothesis is that Threskiornithidae is sister to the rest of Pelecaniformes, and Ardeidae and Pelecani form a clade, as can be seen below:

- Pelecaniformes
  - Threskiornithidae – ibises, spoonbills (36 species)
  - - Ardeidae – herons, bitterns (72 species)
    - Pelecani
      - Pelecanidae – pelicans (8 species)
      - - Scopidae – hamerkop
        - Balaenicipitidae – shoebill

These controversies have been explained by analyses of rare genomic changes, which suggested that after the divergence of the pelican (Pelecanidae), heron (Ardeidae), and ibis (Threskiornithidae) lineages, interspecies hybridization led to gene flow causing the heron lineage to exhibit genetic signatures indicating affinity to both the pelican and ibis lineages.

=== Fossils ===
All families in the traditional Pelecaniformes (except the Phalacrocoracidae) have only a few handfuls of extant species at most, but many were more speciose in the Early Neogene. The pelecaniform lineages appear to have originated around the end of the Cretaceous, appearing to belong to a close-knit group of "higher waterbirds" which also includes groups such as penguins and Procellariiformes. Quite a lot of fossil bones from around the Cretaceous–Paleogene boundary cannot be firmly placed with any of these orders and rather combine traits of several of them. This is, of course, only to be expected, if the theory that most if not all of these "higher waterbird" lineages originated around that time is correct. Of those apparently basal taxa, the following show some similarities to the traditional Pelecaniformes:

- † Lonchodytes (Lance Creek Late Cretaceous of Wyoming, US)
- † Torotix (Late Cretaceous)
- † Tytthostonyx (Late Cretaceous/Early Palaeocene)
- † Cladornis (Deseado Early Oligocene of Patagonia, Argentina)
- † "Liptornis"—a nomen dubium

Fossil genera and species are discussed in the respective family or genus accounts; one little-known prehistoric Pelecaniforme, however, cannot be classified accurately enough to assign them to a family; "Sula" ronzoni from Early Oligocene rocks at Ronzon, France, which was initially believed to be a sea-duck, is a possible ancestral Pelecaniform. The proposed Elopterygidae—supposedly a family of Cretaceous Pelecaniformes—are neither monophyletic nor does Elopteryx appear to be a modern bird.
