= Zygomasseteric system =

Bones & muscles in rodents' heads that enable them to chew front-to-back

The zygomasseteric system (or zygomasseteric structure) refers to the anatomical arrangement of the masseter muscle and the zygomatic arch (cheek bone) in the skulls of rodents. This system plays a crucial role in the diverse chewing mechanics observed across rodent species. The zygomatic arch is modified to accommodate the masseter muscle, a primary muscle responsible for jaw movement. The masseter muscle itself is often divided into superficial, lateral, and medial components, allowing for a wide range of jaw motion, particularly the anteroposterior or propalinal movement (front-to-back chewing motion) characteristic of rodents. Variations in the structure of the zygomatic arch and the masseter muscle's insertion points have led to the classification of rodents into four main zygomasseteric types: protrogomorphous, sciuromorphous, hystricomorphous, and myomorphous, reflecting adaptations to different dietary niches and chewing strategies.

== Protrogomorphy ==
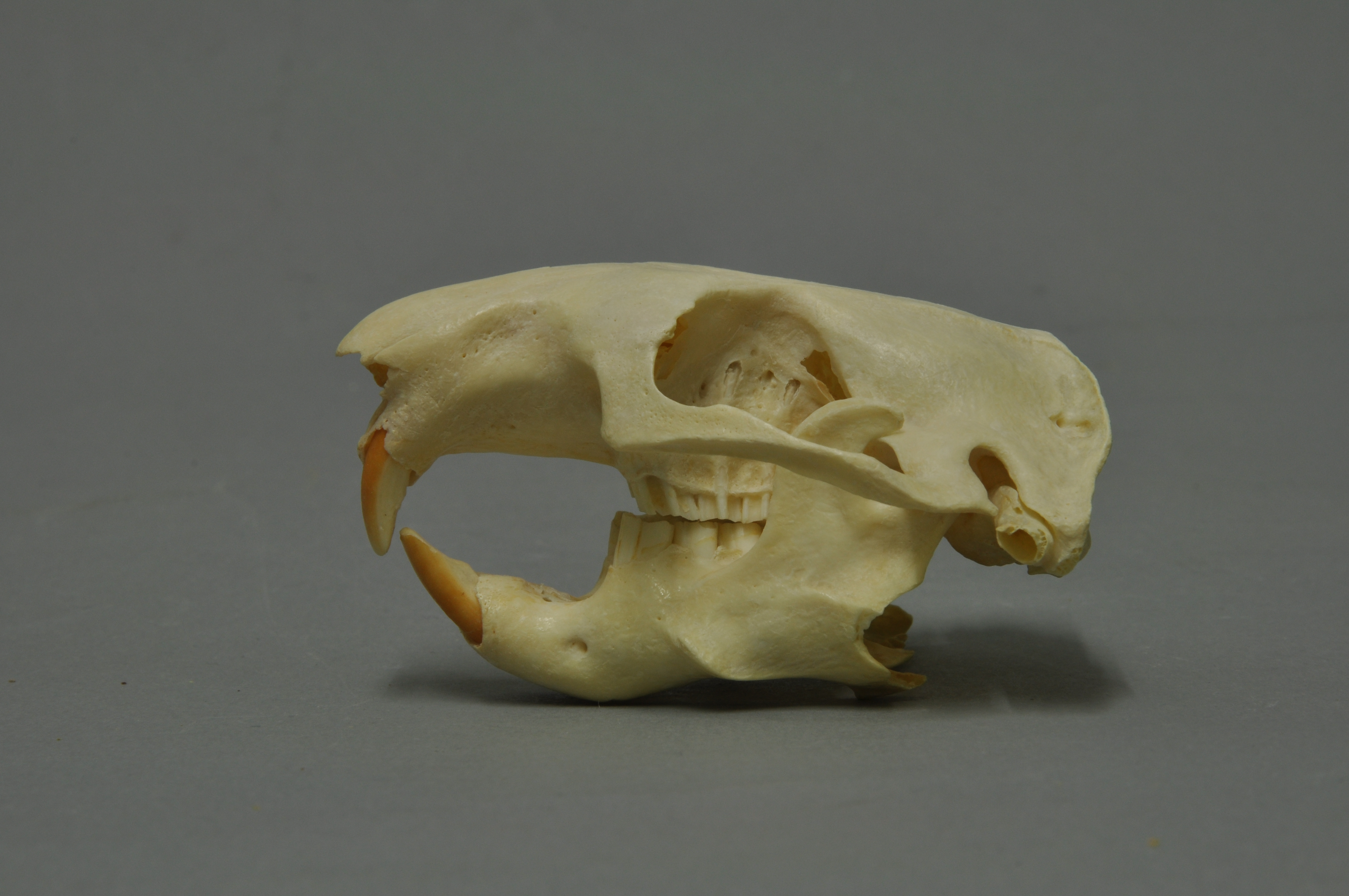
Skull of Aplodontia rufa

The members of this grade include nearly all of the pre-Oligocene rodents of North America and Asia and some of those of Europe. Several lineages survive into the Oligocene or early Miocene, with only one species still alive today, the mountain beaver (Aplodontia rufa). The molerats (family Bathyergidae) are considered secondarily protrogomorphous since their zygomatic condition is clearly derived from a hystricomorphous ancestor. The rostrum of protrogomorph rodents is unmodified and the infraorbital foramen is small. The superficial masseter originates on the lateral surface of the anterior maxilla and inserts along the ventral margin of the angular process of the mandible. The lateral masseter inserts here as well and originates from the lateral portion of the zygomatic arch. The small medial masseter originates along the medial surface of the zygomatic arch and inserts along the dorsal portion of the mandible at the end of the tooth row.

== Sciuromorphy ==
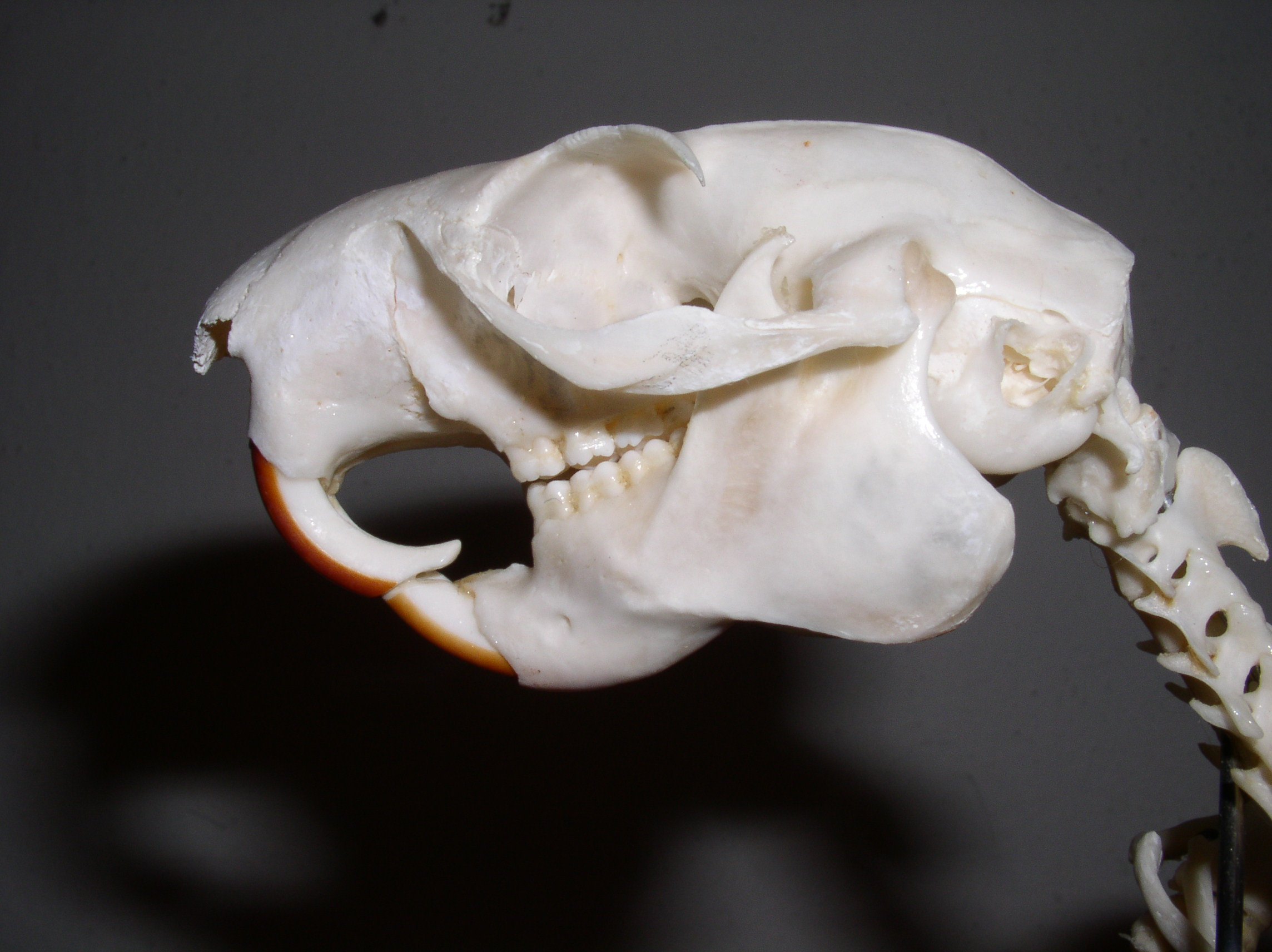
Skull of an oriental giant squirrel. Note the classic sciuromorphous shape of the anterior zygomatic region.

This condition is found in most members of the family Sciuridae (suborder Sciuromorpha), and also in members of the Castoridae, the Eomyidae, and the Geomyoidea. Relative to the primitive protrogomorphous condition, the superficial masseter remains unchanged. The lateral masseter has shifted forward and upward, behind and medial to the superficial masseter. Here it originates from a wide zygomatic plate developed on the anterior (maxillary) root of the zygomatic arch. This shift of origin changed the direction of pull of the anterior part of the lateral masseter from 30 to 60 degrees, greatly strengthening the forward component of the masseter contraction.

== Hystricomorphy ==
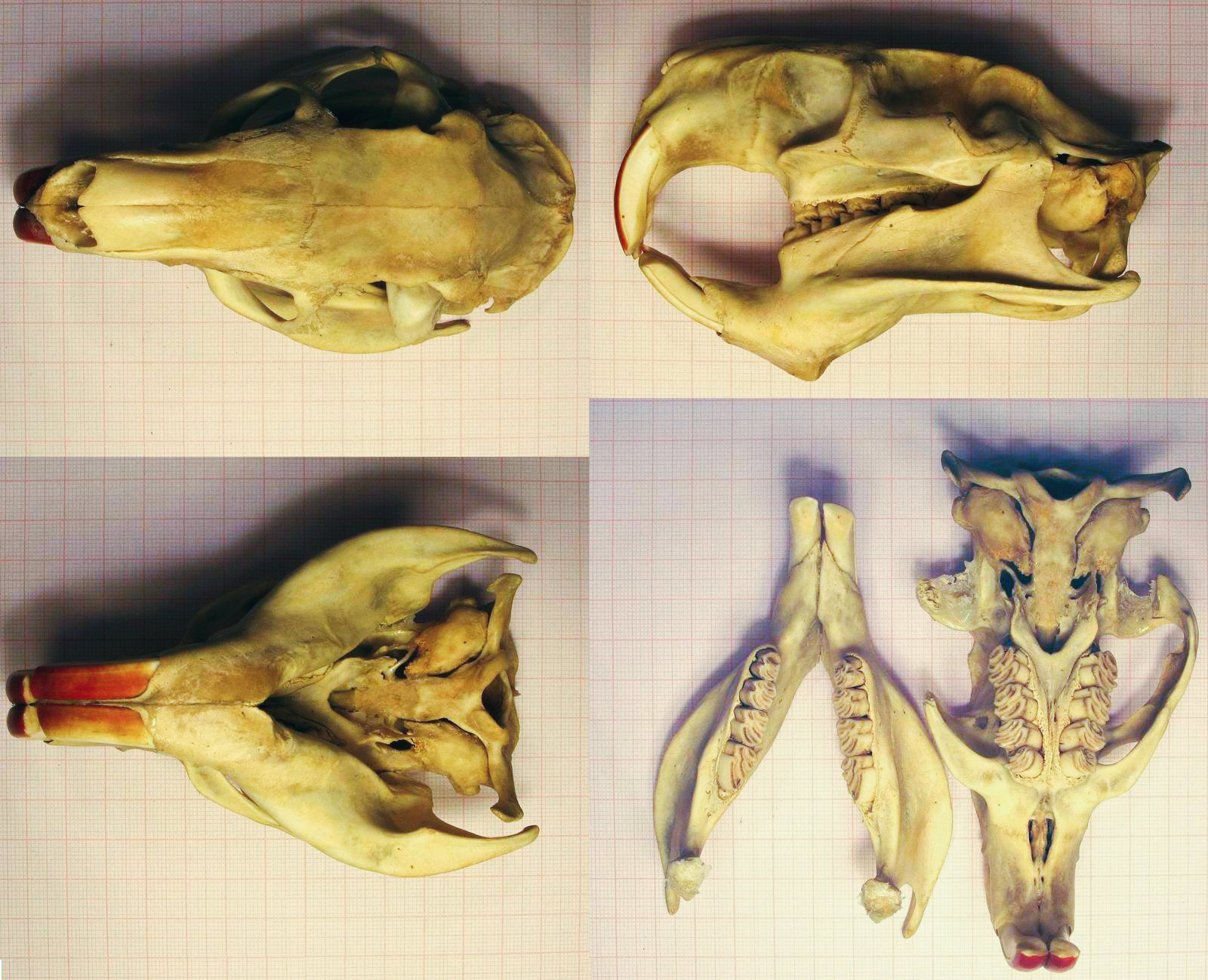
Skull of a nutria demonstrating the hystricognathous lower jaw and hystricomorphous zygomasseteric system.

This condition is found throughout the suborders Hystricomorpha and Anomaluromorpha. In the suborder Myomorpha, it is found in the superfamily Dipodoidea and some fossil Muroidea (such as Pappocricetodon). Hystricomorphy is also found in the African dormouse Graphiurus, which is a member of the suborder Sciuromorpha.

In hystricomorphs the medial masseter is enlarged and originates on the side of the rostrum (in extreme cases as far forward as the premaxilla), where it then passes through a greatly enlarged infraorbital foramen to insert on the mandible. This gives an almost horizontal resultant to the muscle contraction.

== Myomorphy ==
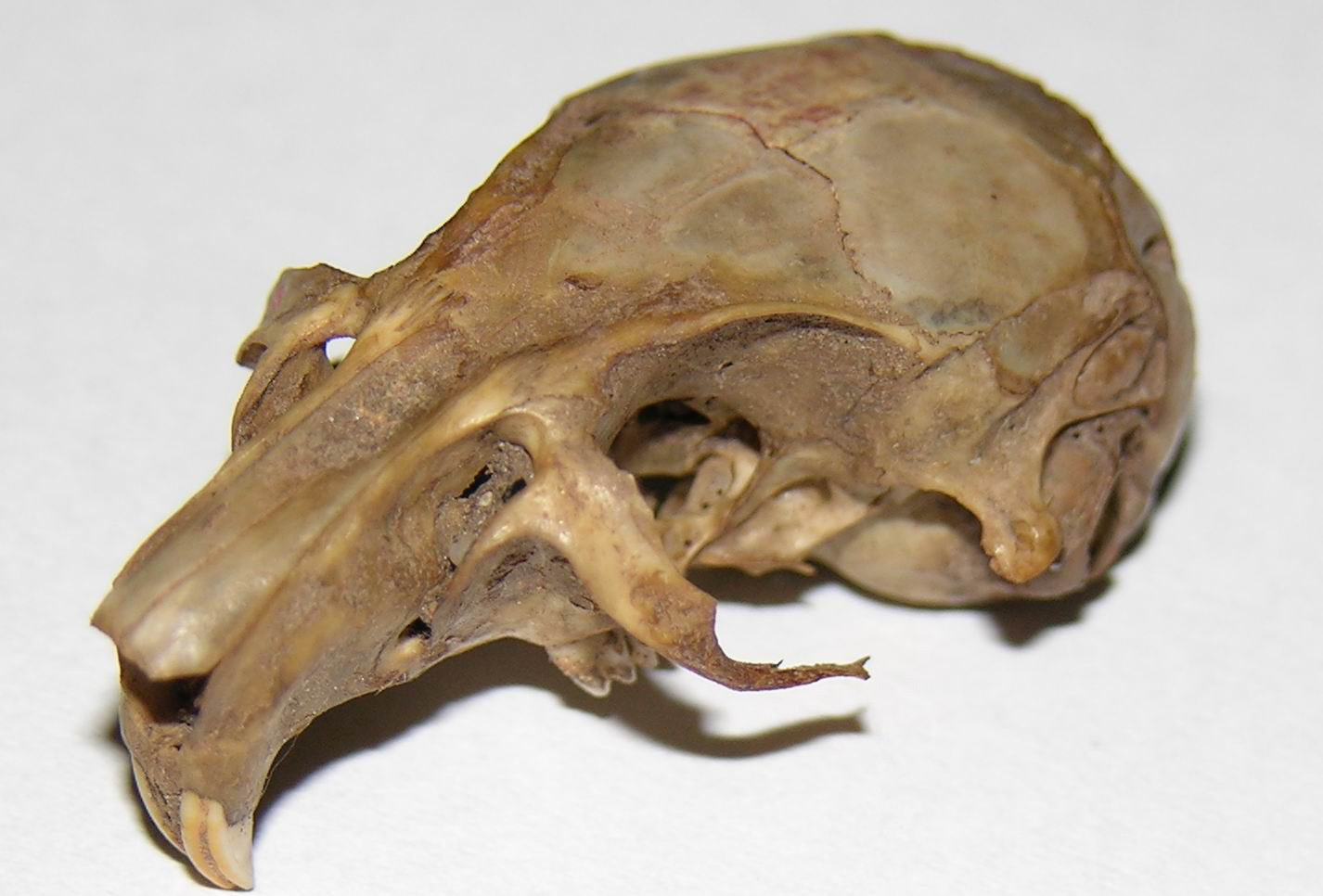
Gerbil skull displaying the myomorphous condition

This condition is found in the Muroidea (Myomorpha) and most Gliridae (Sciuromorpha: in the latter it is often referred to as pseudomyomorphy). suggest that the infraorbital foramen of the extinct sciurid subfamily Cedromurinae may have allowed for the passage of the masseter muscle. If true, this subfamily would represent an additional example of myomorphy in the rodent suborder Sciuromorpha.

Myomorphs combine characteristics found in both the sciuromorphous and hystricomorphous rodents. Both the lateral and medial masseter muscles have migrated, and both a large zygomatic plate as well as a large infraorbital foramen are present. This type gives the greatest anteroposterior component of any rodent zygomasseteric system, which might explain the success of the cosmopolitan Muroidea.
