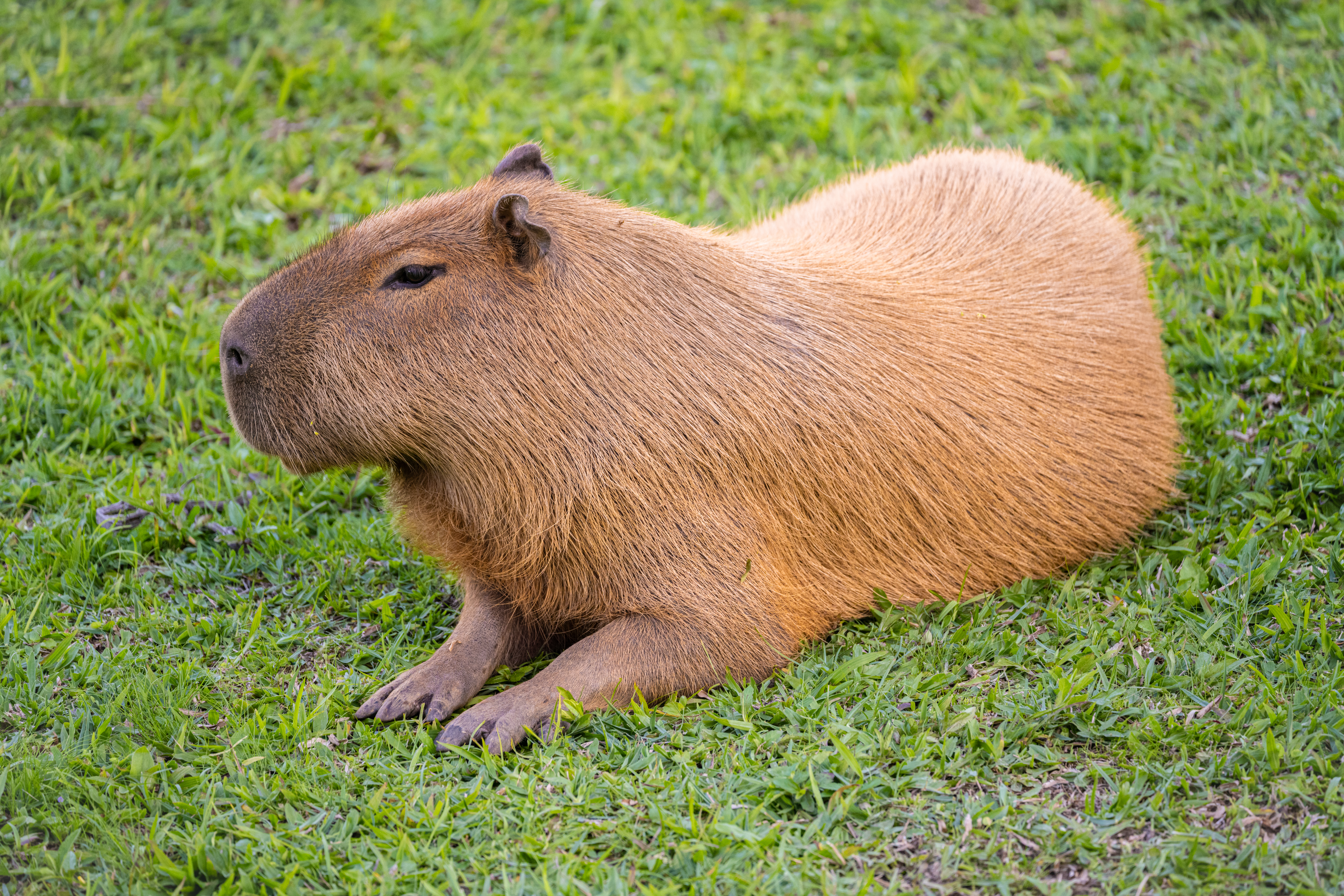
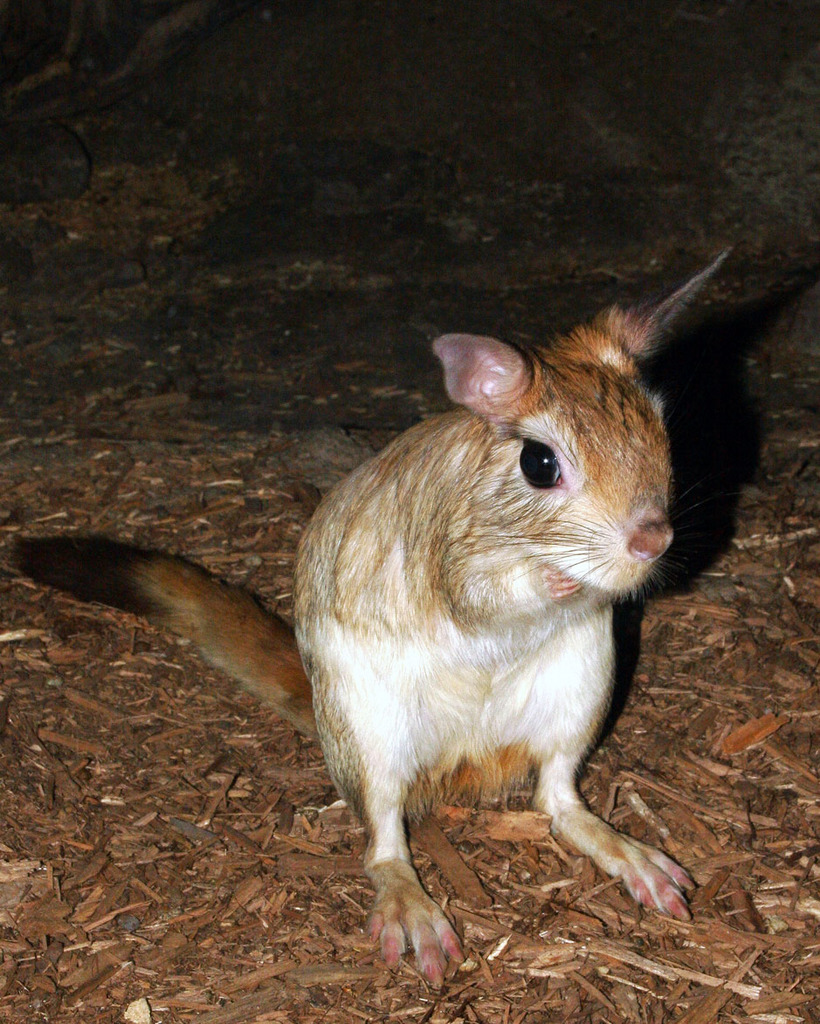
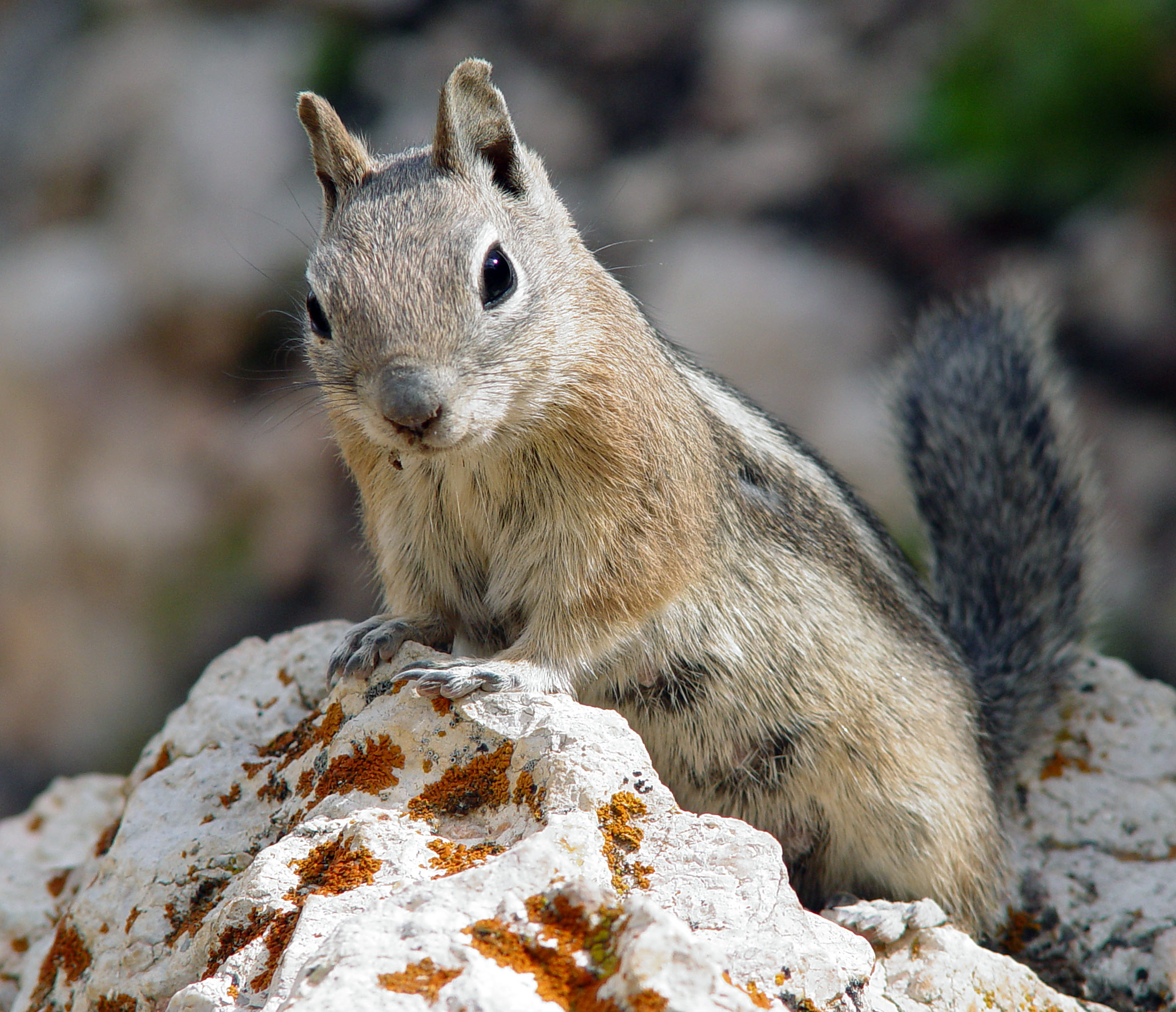
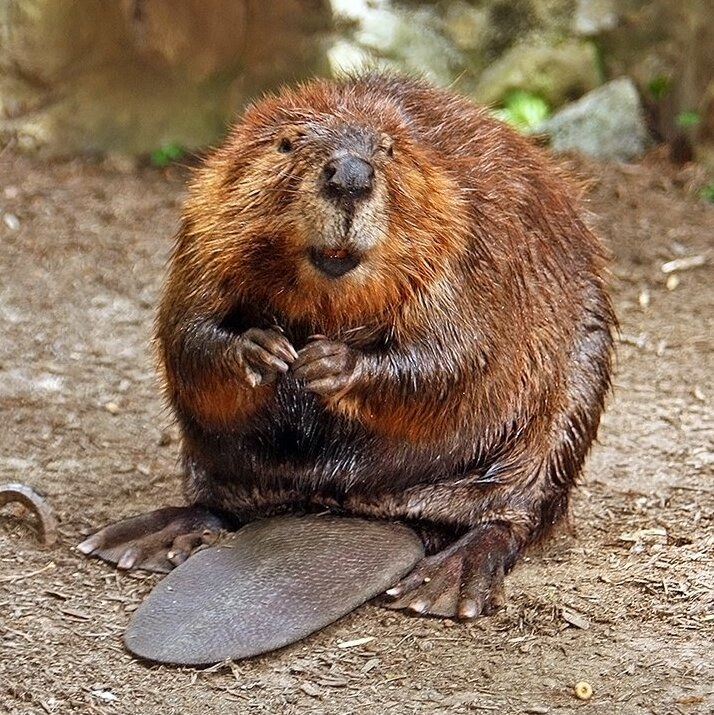
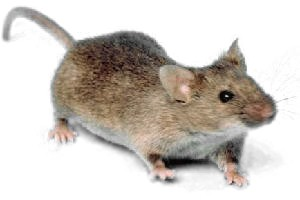
- Capybara Springhare Golden-mantled ground squirrel North American beaver House mouse

Scientific classification
- Kingdom: Animalia
- Phylum: Chordata
- Class: Mammalia
- Mirorder: Simplicidentata
- Order: Rodentia; Bowdich, 1821

Suborders
- Anomaluromorpha; Castorimorpha; Hystricomorpha (incl. Caviomorpha); Myomorpha; Sciuromorpha
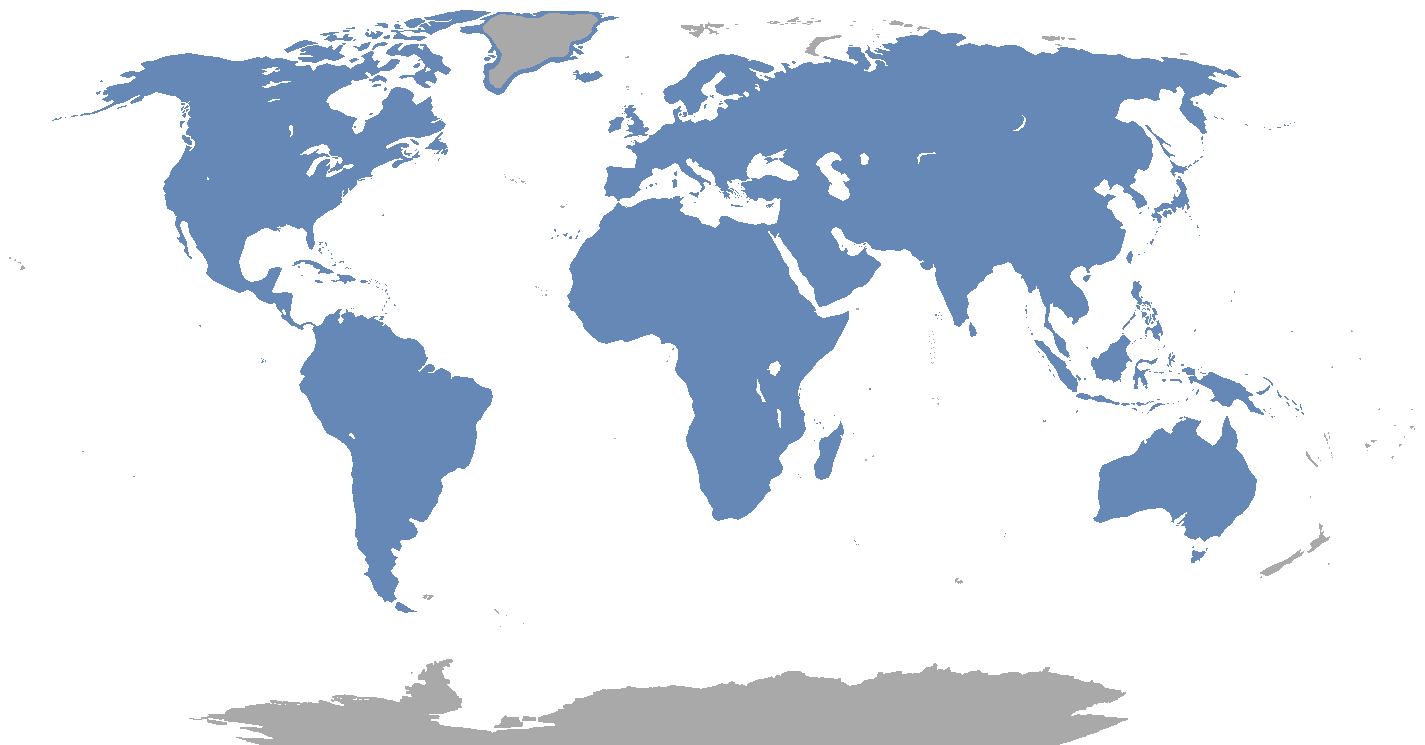
- Combined range of all rodent species (not including introduced populations)

= Rodent =

Rodent Temporal range: Late Paleocene – recent

Order of mammals

Rodents (from Latin rodens 'gnawing') are a group of mammals belonging to the order Rodentia (/roʊˈdɛn(t)ʃə/ roh-DEN-shə or roh-DEN-chə), characterized by a single pair of continuously growing incisors in each of the upper and lower jaws. Rodents make up about 40% of all mammal species. Rodents are native to all major landmasses except Antarctica and a handful of isolated oceanic islands — though humans have since introduced them to nearly all of these places too. Most rodents are small animals with robust bodies, short limbs, and long tails. They use their sharp incisors to gnaw food, excavate burrows, and defend themselves. Most of them eat plant material, but some have more varied diets.

Rodents are extremely diverse in their ecology and lifestyles and can be found in almost every terrestrial habitat, including human-made environments. Species can be arboreal, fossorial (burrowing), saltatorial/ricochetal (leaping on their hind legs), or semiaquatic. They tend to be social animals, and many species live in societies with complex ways of communicating with each other. Mating among rodents can vary from monogamy, to polygyny, to promiscuity. Many have litters of underdeveloped, altricial young, while others are precocial (relatively well-developed) at birth.

The rodent fossil record dates back to the Paleocene of Asia. Rodents greatly diversified in the Eocene, as they spread across continents, sometimes even crossing oceans. Rodents reached both South America and Madagascar from Africa and, until the arrival of Homo sapiens, were the only terrestrial placental mammals to reach and colonize Australia. Rodentia and Lagomorpha (rabbits, hares, and pikas) are sister groups, sharing a single common ancestor and forming the clade of Glires. Lagomorphs also have incisors that grow continuously, but are distinguished by an extra pair of incisors on the upper jaw.

Rodents have been used as food, for clothing, as pets, and as laboratory animals in research. Some species, in particular the brown rat, the black rat, and the house mouse, are serious pests, eating and spoiling food stored by humans and spreading diseases. Accidentally introduced species of rodents are often considered to be invasive. Well-known rodents include mice, rats, squirrels, prairie dogs, porcupines, beavers, guinea pigs, and hamsters.

== Characteristics ==
The distinguishing feature of the rodents is their pairs of continuously growing, sharpened incisors. Enamel covers the front of the incisor, but the back is uncovered. Because they do not stop growing, the animal must continuously wear them down by gnawing. Otherwise, they can become so long that they pierce the skull. As the incisors grind against each other, the softer dentine on the rear of the teeth wears away more quickly, leaving the sharp enamel edge shaped like the blade of a chisel. Rodent species have 12–28 teeth total, usually fewer than 22, with no canines. A gap, or diastema, is present between the incisors and the cheek teeth. This allows rodents to suck in and block out inedible material as the incisors chip it off. Chinchillas and guinea pigs have a high-fiber diet; their molars lack roots and grow continuously like their incisors.

The complexly ridged surface of the rodent molar is well-equipped for grinding food into small particles. The jaw musculature is strong. The lower jaw is thrust forward while gnawing and shifts backward during chewing. The incisors do the gnawing while molars chew; however, due to the cranial anatomy of rodents, these feeding methods cannot be used at the same time. Among rodents, the masseter muscle plays a key role in chewing, making up 60% – 80% of the total muscle mass among masticatory muscles.

In rodents, masseter muscles are attached behind the eyes and contribute to eye-boggling that occurs during gnawing, where the quick contraction and relaxation of the muscles cause the eyeballs to move up and down. Variations in the zygomasseteric system are associated with different specializations in the chewing apparatus. Sciuromorphous rodents, such as the eastern grey squirrel, have a large deep masseter, making them efficient at biting with the incisors. Hystricomorphous rodents, such as the guinea pig, have larger superficial masseter muscles and smaller deep masseter muscles than rats or squirrels, possibly making them less efficient at biting with the incisors. However, their enlarged internal pterygoid muscles may allow them to move the jaw further sideways when chewing. Myomorphous rodents, such as the brown rat, have enlarged temporalis and masseter muscles, making them efficient with both gnawing and chewing.

While the largest species, the capybara, can reach 66 kg (146 lb), most species weigh less than 100 g (3.5 oz). Rodents have wide-ranging morphologies but typically have stout bodies and short limbs. The forefeet usually have five digits, including an opposable thumb, while the hind feet have three to five digits. The elbow gives the forearms great flexibility. The majority of species are plantigrade, walking on the whole foot, and have claw-like nails that vary in size. Rodents have nails on their first digit, which they use in food handling. Such a nail combined with dexterous feeding movement with incisors allows them to eat hard seeds and nuts, a niche that they presently dominate. This thumbnail is argued to be ancestral with exceptions being linked to its replacement by claws in burrowing and for oral-only feeding.

Rodent species use a wide variety of methods of locomotion, including quadrupedal walking, running, burrowing, climbing, bipedal hopping (kangaroo rats and hopping mice), swimming, and even gliding. Flying squirrels can glide from tree to tree using parachute-like membranes that stretch from the fore to the hind limbs. The agouti is fleet-footed and antelope-like, being digitigrade with hoof-like nails. The majority of rodents have tails, which can be of many shapes and sizes. Some tails are prehensile, as in the Eurasian harvest mouse, and the fur on the tails can vary from bushy to mostly bald. Some species have vestigial or non-visible tails. In some species, the tail is capable of regeneration if a part is broken off.

Rodents generally have well-developed senses of smell and hearing, and the eyes are enlarged in species that are active at night. Many species have long, sensitive whiskers, or vibrissae, for touch or "whisking". Whisker action is mostly driven by the brain stem, which is itself provoked by the cortex, though alternative routes have been found. Many species have cheek pouches for storing food. In squirrels and species of Muroidea, these structures are extensions of the oral cavity, while in gophers and the Heteromyidae, they are separate. Both types reach the shoulders. The digestive system is efficient enough to absorb nearly 80% of the energy in their food. When eating cellulose, the food is softened in the stomach and directed to the cecum, where bacteria reduce it to its carbohydrate elements. The rodent then practices coprophagy, eating its own fecal pellets, so the nutrients can be absorbed by the gut. The final fecal pellet is hard and dry. They may entirely lack the ability to vomit. In many species, the penis contains a bone, the baculum, and the testes can be located either abdominally or at the groin.

Sexual dimorphism occurs in many rodent species. In some rodents, males are larger than females, while in others the reverse is true. The former is typical for ground squirrels, kangaroo rats, solitary mole-rats, and pocket gophers; it likely developed due to sexual selection, with larger males being more reproductively successful. Female-bias sexual dimorphism exists among chipmunks and jumping mice. Its function is not understood, but in the case of yellow-pine chipmunks, males may choose larger females due to their greater fitness. In some species, such as voles, sexual dimorphism can vary from population to population. In bank voles, females are usually the larger sex, but males may be larger in certain alpine populations, possibly because of the lack of predators and greater competition between them.

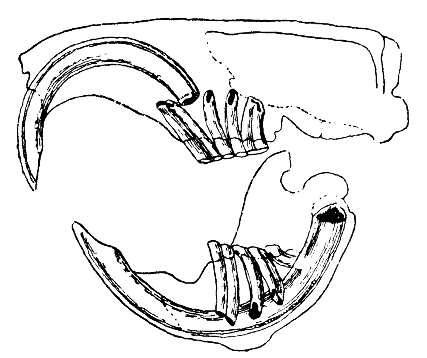
Drawing of typical rodent tooth system: The front surface of the incisors is hard enamel, whereas the rear is softer dentine. The act of chewing wears down the dentine, leaving a sharp, chisel-like edge.

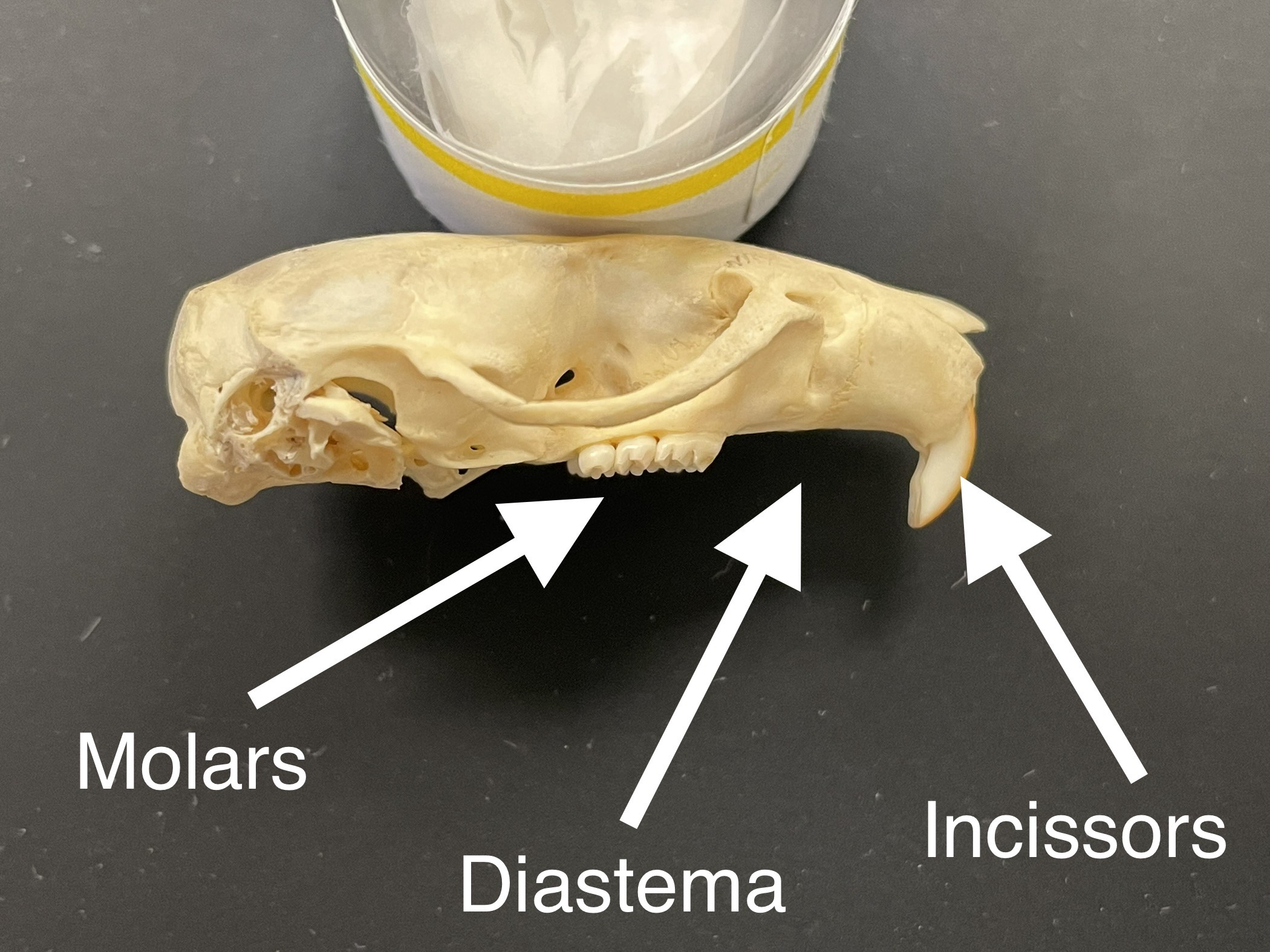
Noticeable diastema in a rat skull

Volume rendering of a mouse skull (CT) using shear warp algorithm

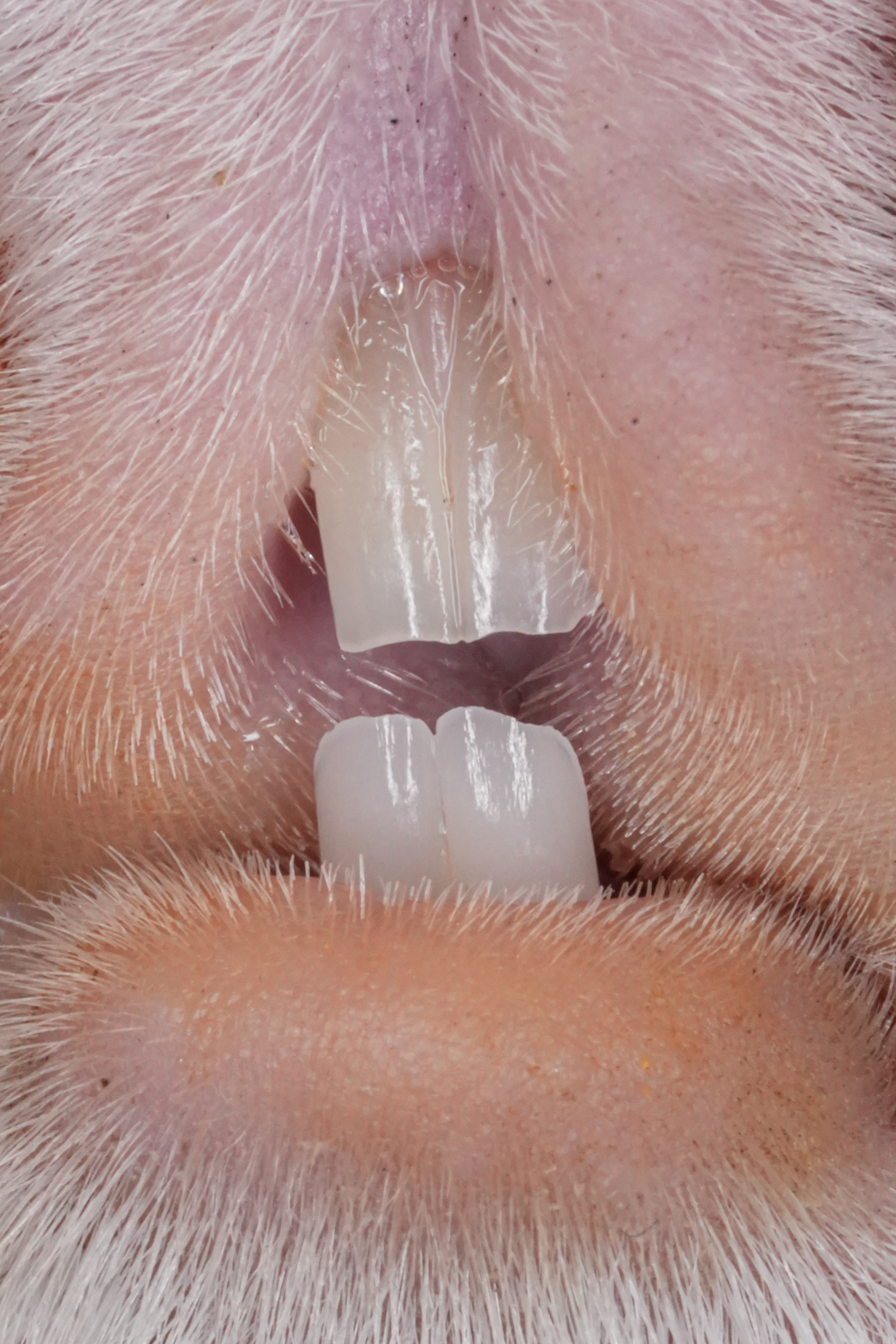
Incisors of a guinea pig

== Distribution and habitat ==
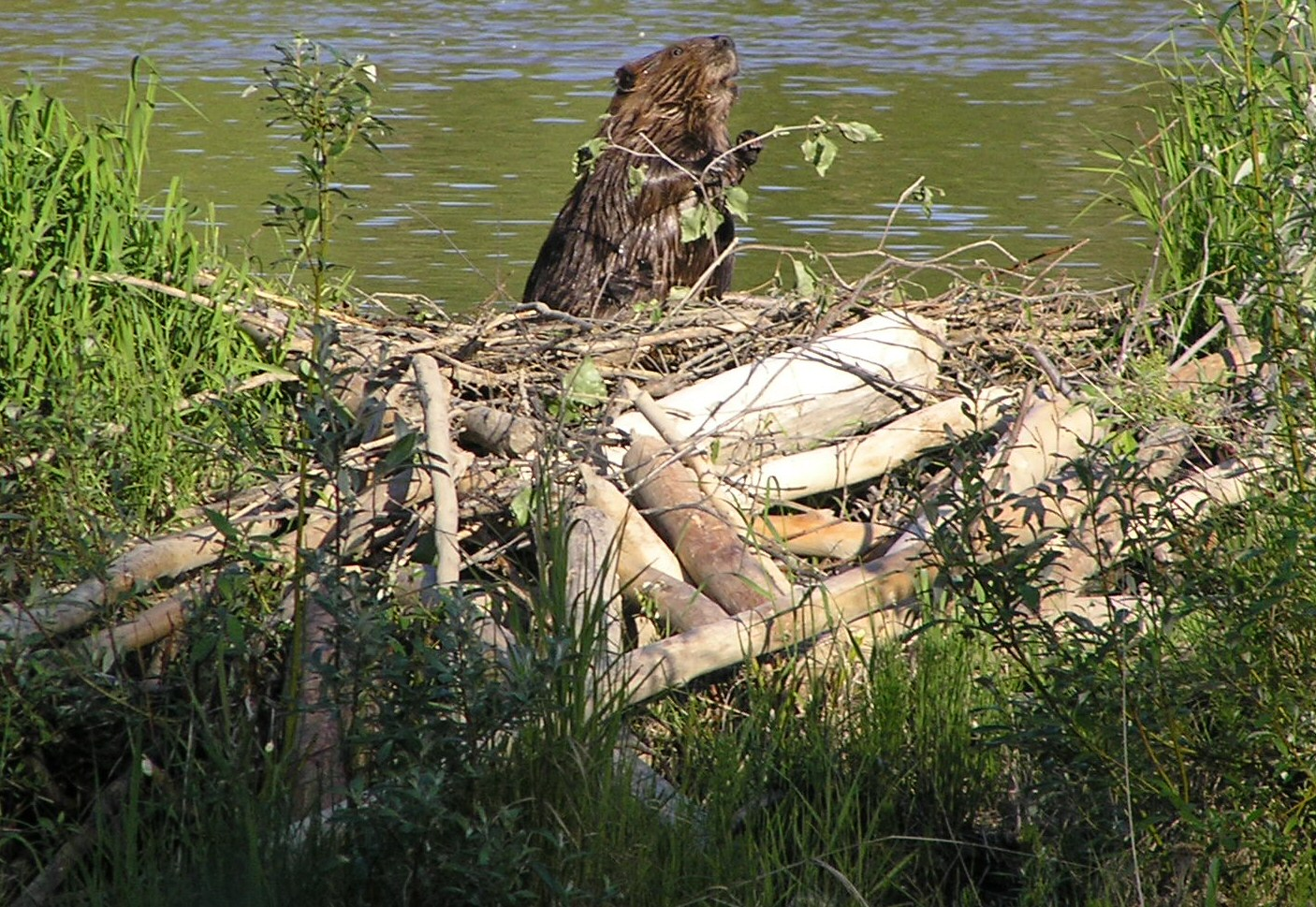
Some rodents, like this North American beaver with its dam of gnawed tree trunks and the lake it has created, are considered ecosystem engineers.

Rodents have a near global distribution, inhabiting every continent except Antarctica. They are the only terrestrial placental mammals to have colonized Australia and New Guinea without human intervention. Humans have also allowed the animals to spread to many remote oceanic islands. Rodents have adapted to almost every terrestrial habitat, from cold tundra (under snow) to hot deserts. Species range from arboreal (tree-dwelling) to fossorial (underground) and semiaquatic. Rodents have also thrived in human-created environments such as agricultural and urban areas.

Though some species are common pests for humans, rodents also play important ecological roles. Burrowing rodents may eat the fruiting bodies of fungi and spread spores through their feces, thereby allowing the fungi to disperse and form symbiotic relationships with the roots of plants (which usually cannot thrive without them). As such, these rodents may help preserve healthy forests. Some rodents are considered keystone species and ecosystem engineers in their respective habitats. In the Great Plains of North America, the burrowing activities of prairie dogs play an important role in grassland habitats, contributing to soil aeration, which leads to more organic material and water absorption. Similarly in many temperate regions, beavers play an essential hydrological role. When building their dams and lodges, beavers alter the paths of streams and rivers and allow for the creation of wetland habitats.

== Behavior and life history ==
=== Feeding ===
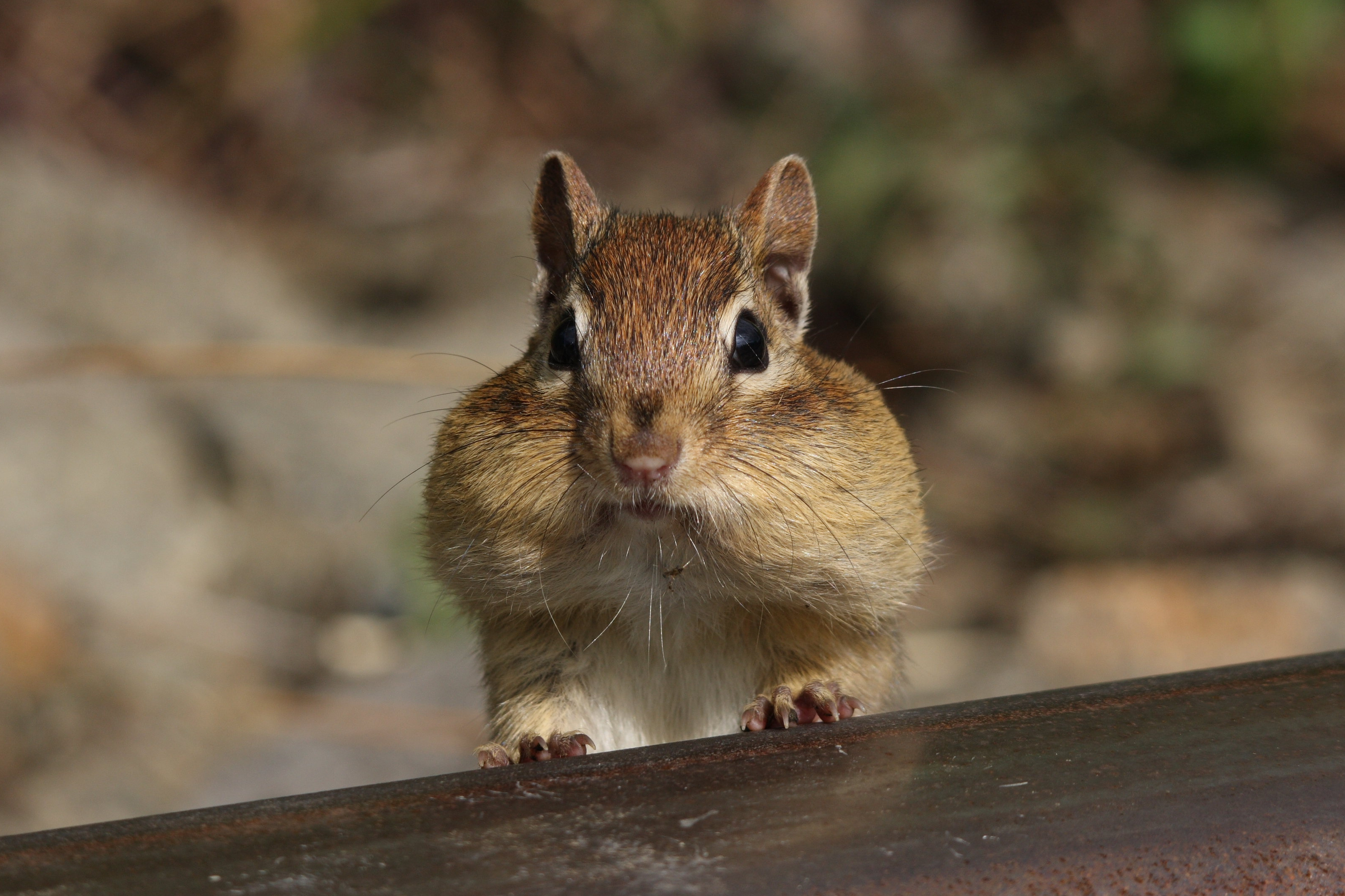
Eastern chipmunk carrying food in cheek pouches

Most rodents are primarily herbivorous, acting only opportunistically as predators; others maintain a more balanced omnivorous diet, while a few are primarily carnivorous and act as specialized predators. The field vole is a typical herbivorous rodent and feeds on grasses, herbs, root tubers, moss, and other vegetation, and gnaws on bark during the winter. It occasionally eats invertebrates such as insect larvae. The plains pocket gopher eats grasses, roots, and tubers in its cheek pouches and caches them in underground larder chambers. The Texas pocket gopher avoids emerging onto the surface to feed by pulling plants above them into their burrows by the roots. It also practices coprophagy. The African pouched rat forages on the surface, gathering anything that might be edible into its capacious cheek pouches until they fully stretch. It then returns to its burrow to sort through the material it has gathered and eats the nutritious items.

Agouti species are one of the few animal groups that can break open the large capsules of the Brazil nut fruit. Too many seeds are inside the fruit to be consumed in one meal, so the agouti carries some off and caches them. This helps dispersal of the seeds, as any that the agouti fails to retrieve are distant from the parent tree when they germinate. Desert-dwelling seed eaters like kangaroo rats must gather as many as they can since they are only available for a limited time. Some rodents eat as much as possible to store fat reserves for the long winter hibernation. Marmots do this, and may be 50% heavier in the autumn than in the spring. Beavers, which feed on tree bark and vegetation, store their winter food in "rafts", piles of wood immersed in water.

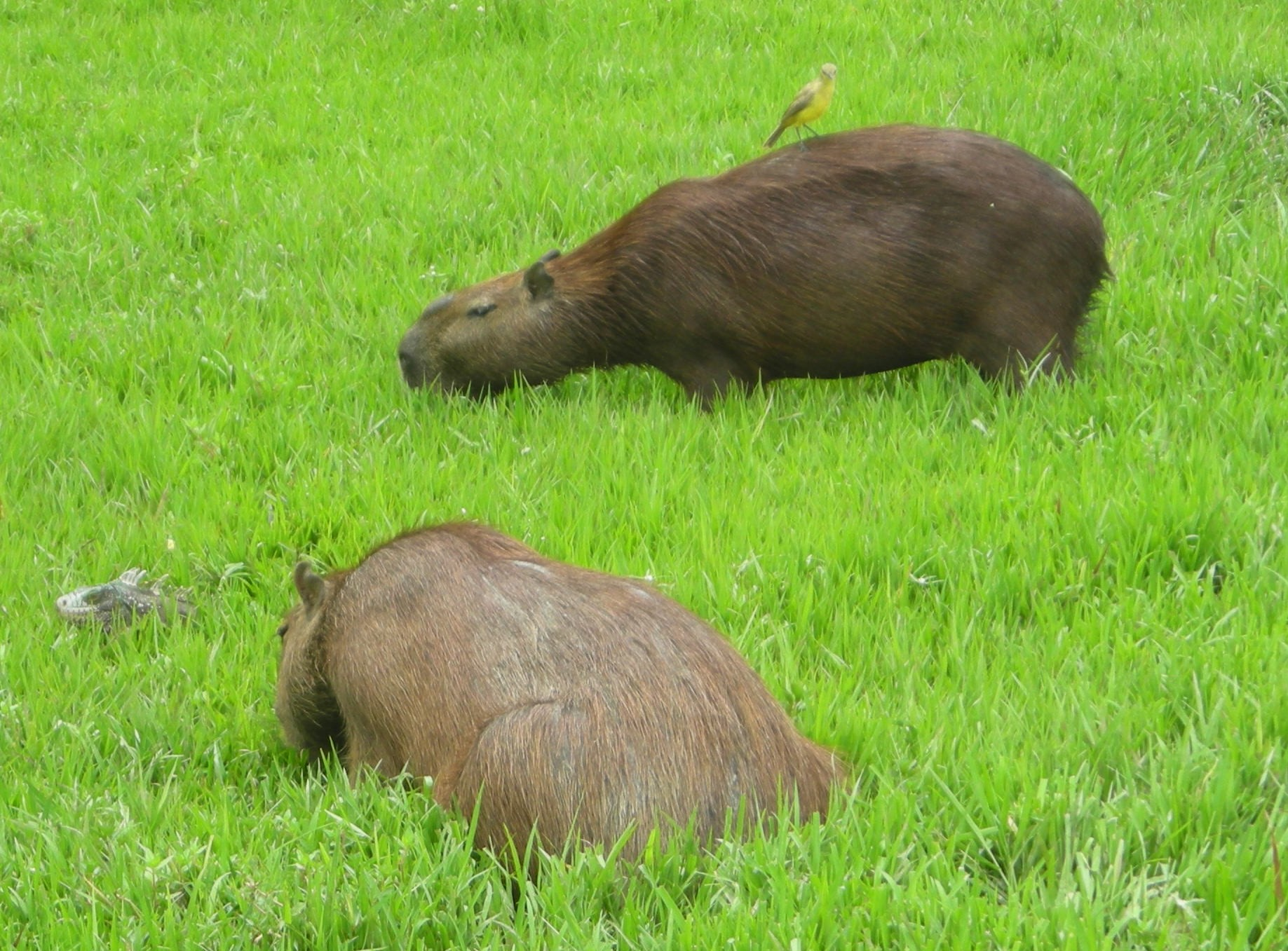
Capybaras grazing

Although rodents have been regarded traditionally as herbivores, most small rodents opportunistically include insects, worms, snails, mussels, and even vertebrates in their diets, and a few have become specialized to rely on a diet of animal matter, such as the shrewlike rats, the rakali, and the grasshopper mouse. A functional-morphological study of the rodent tooth system supports the idea that primitive rodents were omnivores rather than herbivores. Studies of the literature show that numerous members of the Sciuromorpha and Myomorpha, and a few members of the Hystricomorpha, have either included animal matter in their diets or been prepared to eat such food when offered it in captivity. Examination of the stomach contents of the North American white-footed mouse showed 34% animal matter. The grasshopper mouse, which feeds on insects, scorpions, and other small mice, can kill prey as large as itself.

=== Social behavior ===
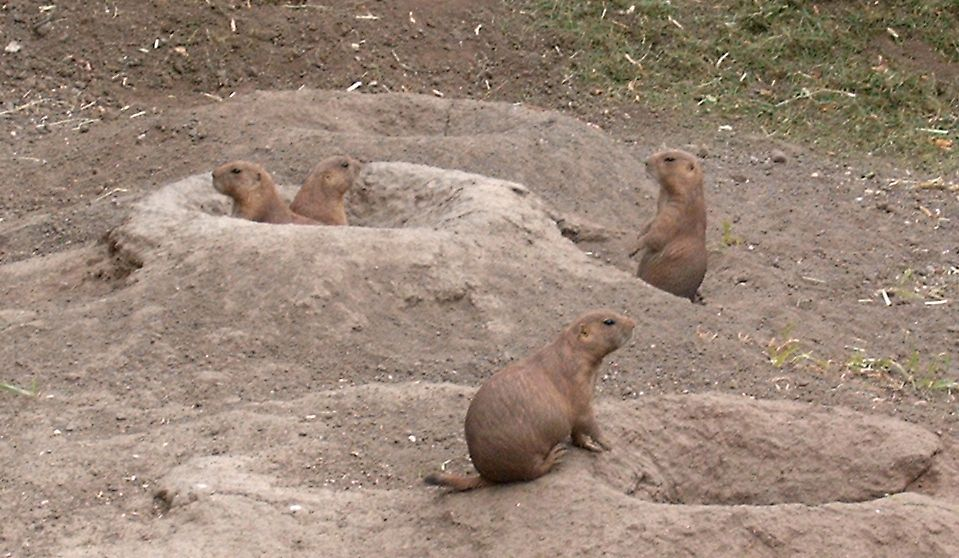
Prairie dog "town". Prairie dogs are extremely social.

The majority of rodent species are social or gregarious, notably prairie dogs and brown rats, while more solitary species include hamsters and red squirrels. The pocket gophers are also solitary outside the breeding season, each individual digging a complex tunnel system and maintaining a territory. Solitary behavior may be linked to the presence of resources that can be claimed and defended. Brown rats usually live in small colonies with up to six females sharing a burrow and one male defending a territory around the burrow. At high population densities, this system breaks down, and males show a hierarchical system of dominance with overlapping ranges. Female offspring remain in the colony while male young disperse. Beavers live in extended family units typically with a pair of adults and their young, including those born in the current and previous year or even older. Prairie vole societies consist of both monogamous pairs and communal groups where only a dominant female breeds. Pairs will join with communal groups during the winter.

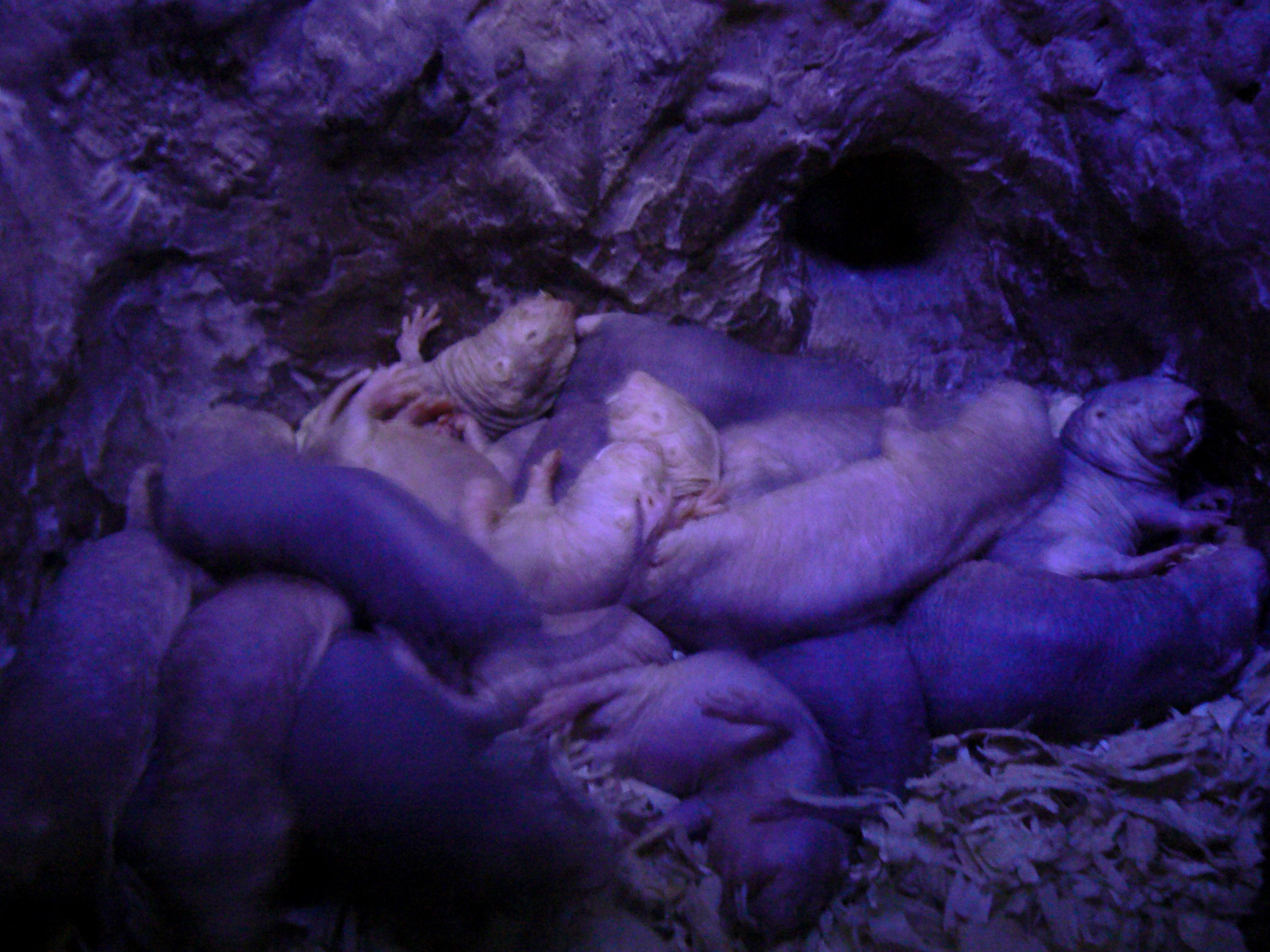
A nest of naked mole-rats

Among the most social of rodents are the ground squirrels, which typically form colonies based on female kinship, with males dispersing after weaning and becoming nomadic as adults. Cooperation in ground squirrels varies between species and typically includes making alarm calls, protecting nesting areas, and preventing infanticide. The prairie dogs live in colonies, or 'towns', which can stretch for kilometers all around and number in the thousands. These consist of territorial family groups known as "coteries" that occupy separate burrows. A coterie often consists of an adult male, three or four adult females, and offspring, including yearlings and juveniles. Individuals within coteries are friendly with each other, but hostile towards outsiders.

Perhaps the most extreme examples of colonial behavior in rodents are the naked mole-rat and Damaraland mole-rat, which are eusocial like colonial insects. These species live in underground colonies, which can number in the hundreds in the case of the naked mole-rat. In both species, colonies consist of one breeding female and a few males, while the rest are non-reproductive, their fertility being suppressed. The non-reproductive members dig, maintain, and seal tunnels, as well as gather food and help with the young.

=== Communication ===
==== Smell ====
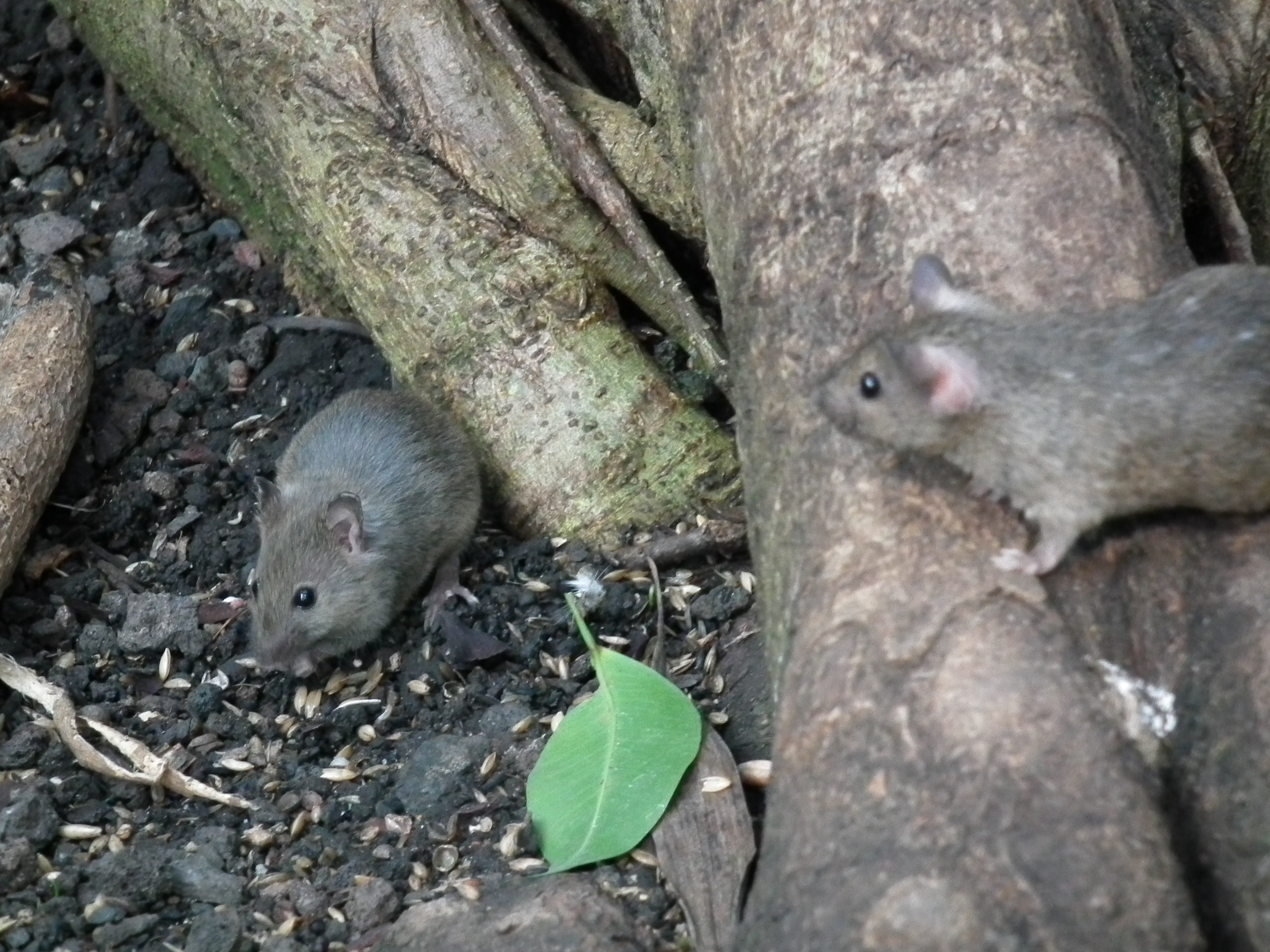
Nepotistic species such as house mice rely on urine, feces, and glandular secretions to recognize their kin.

Rodents use scent marking in many social contexts, including inter- and intra-species communication, the marking of trails, and the establishment of territories. Much can be learned about an individual from their urine, including their species, individual identity, sex, reproductive status, health, and social rank. Compounds derived from the major histocompatibility complex (MHC) bind to several urinary proteins. The odor of a predator reduces scent-marking behavior.

Rodents are able to recognize close relatives by smell, and this allows them to show nepotism (preferential behavior toward their kin) and avoid inbreeding. This kin recognition is by olfactory cues from urine, feces, and glandular secretions. The main assessment may involve the MHC, where the degree of relatedness of two individuals is correlated to the MHC genes they have in common. In non-kin communication, where more permanent odor markers are required, as at territorial borders, then non-volatile major urinary proteins (MUPs), which function as pheromone transporters, may also be used. MUPs may also advertise individual identity, with each male house mouse (Mus musculus) having uniquely encoded MUPs in its urine.

House mice urinate to mark territory and advertise their individual and group identity. Territorial beavers and red squirrels react more to the scents of strangers than those of their neighbors. This is known as the "dear enemy effect".

==== Sound ====
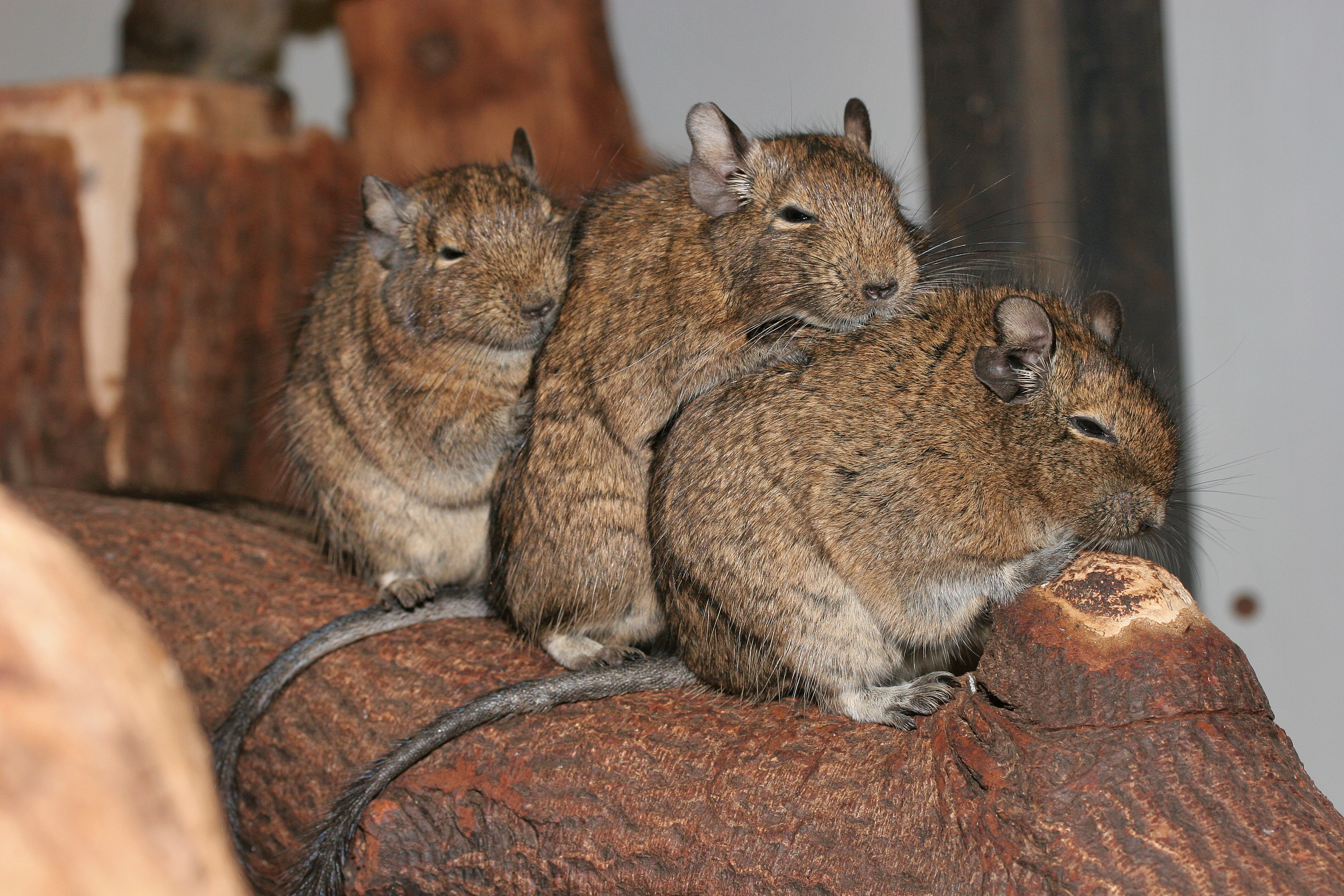
Common degus have a complex vocal repertoire.

Many rodent species, particularly those that are diurnal and social, have a wide range of alarm calls that are emitted when they perceive threats. There are both direct and indirect benefits of doing this. A potential predator may stop when it knows it has been detected, or an alarm call can allow related individuals or others of the same species to take evasive action. Prairie dogs in particular have complex anti-predator alarm call systems. These species may have different calls for different predators (e.g., aerial predators or ground-based predators), and each call contains information about the nature of the precise threat. The urgency of the threat can also be conveyed by the acoustic properties of the call.

Social rodents have a wider range of vocalizations than do solitary species. At least fifteen separate call types have been recorded in adult Kataba mole-rats and four in juveniles. Similarly, the common degu, another social, burrowing rodent, exhibits an elaborate vocal range comprising fifteen different vocalizations. Ultrasonic calls play a part in social communication between dormice and are used when the individuals are out of sight of each other.

House mice use both audible and ultrasonic calls in a variety of contexts. Audible vocalizations can often be heard during agonistic or aggressive encounters, whereas ultrasound is used in sexual communication and also by pups when they have fallen out of the nest.

Marmot whistling

Laboratory rats (which are brown rats, Rattus norvegicus) emit short, high-frequency, ultrasonic vocalizations during purportedly pleasurable experiences such as rough-and-tumble play, during mating, and when tickled. The vocalization, described as a distinct "chirping", has been likened to laughter and is interpreted as an expectation of something rewarding. In clinical studies, the chirping is associated with positive emotional feelings, and social bonding occurs with the tickler, resulting in the rats becoming conditioned to seek the tickling. However, as the rats age, the tendency to chirp declines.

==== Visual ====
Rodents are typical of placental mammals in having only two types of light-receptive cones in their retina (dichromacy); in their case, a short-wavelength "blue-UV" type and a middle-wavelength "green" type. However, they are visually sensitive to the ultraviolet (UV) spectrum and therefore can see light that humans cannot. The functions of this UV sensitivity are not always clear. In degus, for example, more UV light reflects from the belly fur, allowing it to signal to other degus when it stands on its hind legs. The back fur is less reflective, so the degu stands on all fours when a predator is near. Ultraviolet light is more visible during the day, making UV vision more advantageous for diurnal species.

The urine of many rodents (e.g., voles, degus, mice, rats) strongly reflects UV light, and this may be used in communication by leaving visible as well as olfactory markings. However, it can also be detected by predators; the common kestrel can see fresh vole urine via UV light and determine their abundance.

==== Touch ====
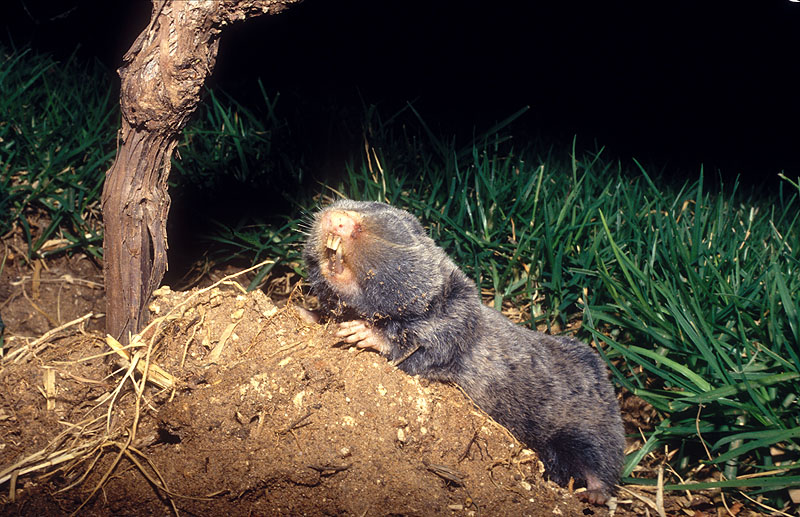
The Middle East blind mole-rat uses seismic communication.

Some rodents communicate with surface vibrations, known as seismic communication. The fossorial Middle East blind mole-rat communicates over long distances by head thumping. Foot drumming is used widely as a predator warning or defensive action. It is used primarily by fossorial or semi-fossorial rodents. The banner-tailed kangaroo rat produces several complex foot-drumming patterns in a number of different contexts, one of which is when it encounters a snake. The foot drumming may alert nearby offspring but most likely conveys that the rat is too alert for a successful attack, forcing the snake to not pursue. Several studies have indicated intentional use of ground vibrations as a means of intra-specific communication during courtship among the Cape mole-rat.

=== Mating strategies ===
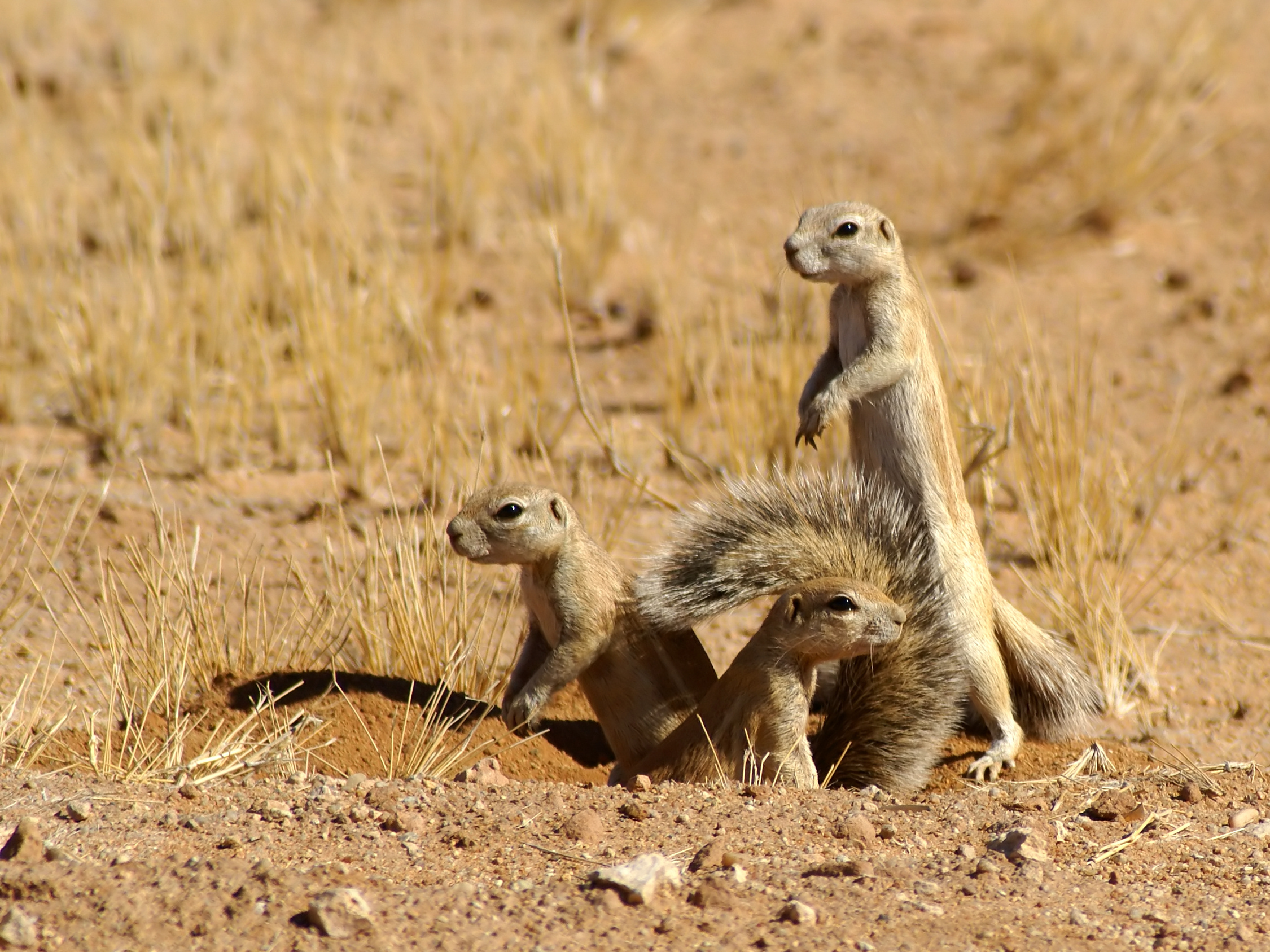
The Cape ground squirrel is an example of both a promiscuous and non-defense polygynous rodent.

Some species of rodent are monogamous, with an adult male and female forming a lasting pair bond. Monogamy can come in two forms: obligate and facultative. In obligate monogamy, both parents care for the offspring and play an important part in their survival. This occurs in species such as California deermice, oldfield mice, Malagasy giant rats, and beavers. In these species, males usually mate only with their partners. In addition to increased care for young, obligate monogamy can also be beneficial to the adult male as it increases the chances of having a mate, particularly a fertile one. In facultative monogamy, the males do not provide direct parental care and are forced to mate with one female due to more dispersed social spacing. Prairie voles appear to be an example of this form of monogamy, with males guarding and defending females within their vicinity.

In polygynous species, males will try to monopolize and mate with multiple females. As with monogamy, polygyny in rodents can come in two forms: defense and non-defense. Defense polygyny involves males defending areas where females are spatially clumped as territories. This occurs in ground squirrels like yellow-bellied marmots, California ground squirrels, Columbian ground squirrels, and Richardson's ground squirrels. Males with territories are known as "resident" males, and the females that live within the territories are known as "resident" females. In the case of marmots, resident males do not appear to ever lose their territories and always repel invading males. Some species are also known to directly defend their resident females, and the ensuing fights can lead to serious injuries. In species with non-defense polygyny, males are not territorial and wander widely in search of females. These males establish dominance hierarchies, with the high-ranking males having access to the most females. This occurs in species like Belding's ground squirrels and some tree squirrel species.

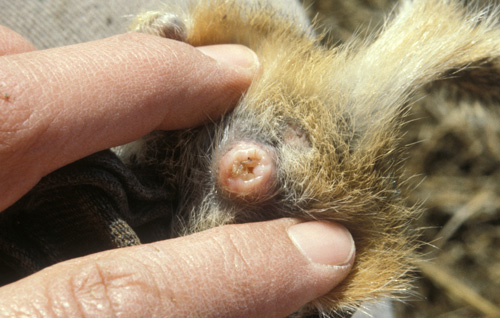
A mating plug in a female Richardson's ground squirrel

Promiscuity, in which both males and females mate with multiple partners, also occurs in rodents. In species such as Gunnison's prairie dogs, females give birth to litters with multiple paternities. Promiscuity leads to increased sperm competition, and males tend to have larger testicles. In the Cape ground squirrel, the male's testes can be 20 percent of its head-body length. Several rodent species have flexible mating systems that can vary between monogamy, polygyny, and promiscuity.

Female rodents play an active role in choosing their mates. Factors that contribute to female preference may include the fitness, dominance, and spatial awareness of the male. In the eusocial naked mole-rats, a single female monopolizes mating from the breeding males. Reproductively active female naked mole-rats are more discriminating in the males they associate with, preferring non-relatives; this is likely a protective measure against inbreeding.

In most rodent species, ovulation is cyclical, while a minority of species have it induced by mating. Males of some rodent species leave behind a mating plug, which blocks both sperm leakage and other males from inseminating the female. Females can remove the plug and may do so right after mating or after several hours.

=== Birth and parenting ===
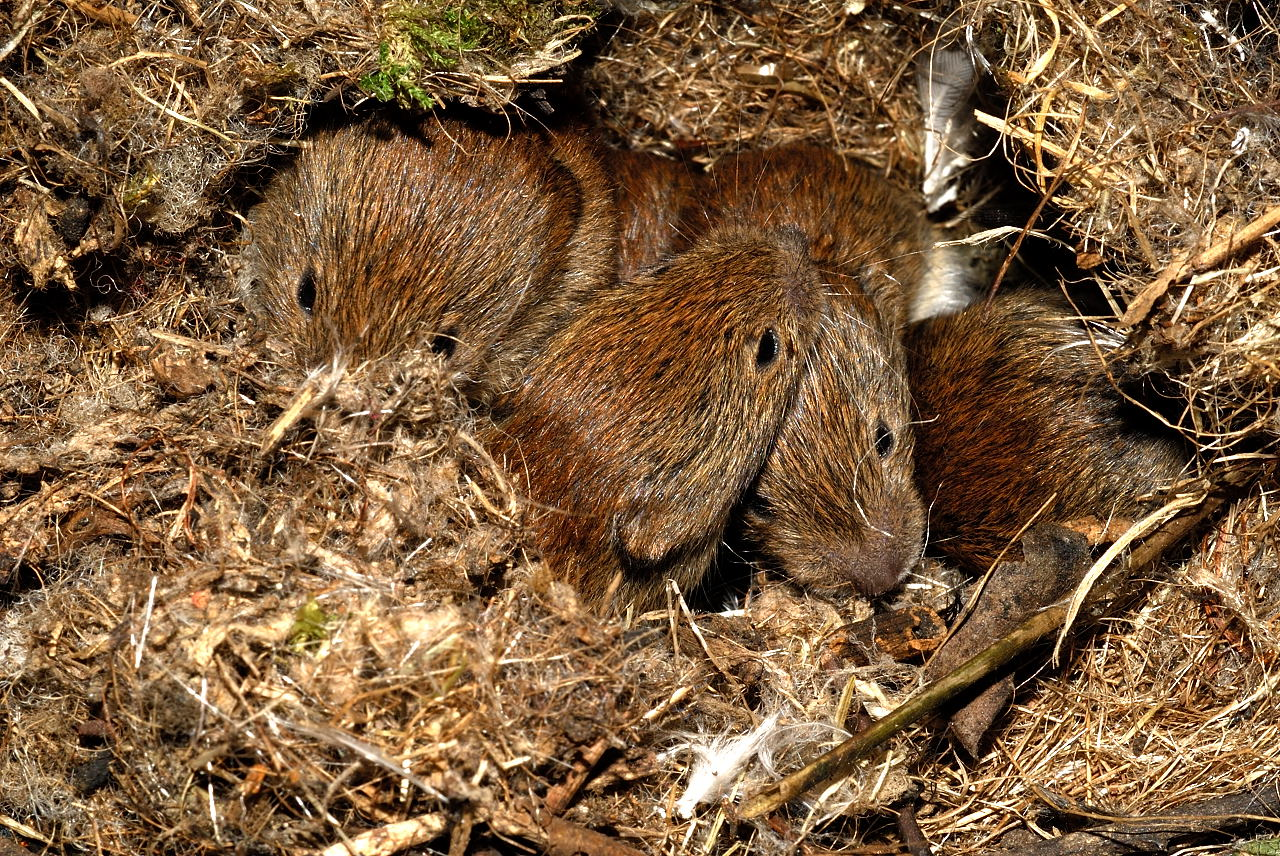
Young bank voles in their nest beneath a wood pile

Rodents may be born either altricial (blind, hairless, and relatively underdeveloped) or precocial (mostly furred, eyes open, and fairly developed) depending on the species. The altricial state is typical for squirrels and mice, while the precocial state usually occurs in species like guinea pigs and porcupines. Females with altricial young typically construct complex nests for their young, lasting from before birth until they are weaned. The female gives birth sitting or lying down, and the young emerge in the direction she is facing. Starting at a few days old, when their eyes first open, offspring can periodically venture outside.

In precocial species, the mothers invest little in nest building, and some do not build nests at all. The female gives birth standing as the offspring emerge behind her. Mothers maintain contact with their highly mobile young with contact calls. Though relatively independent and weaned within days, precocial young may continue to nurse and be groomed by their mothers. Rodent litter sizes also vary, with smaller litters having longer maternal care than larger ones.

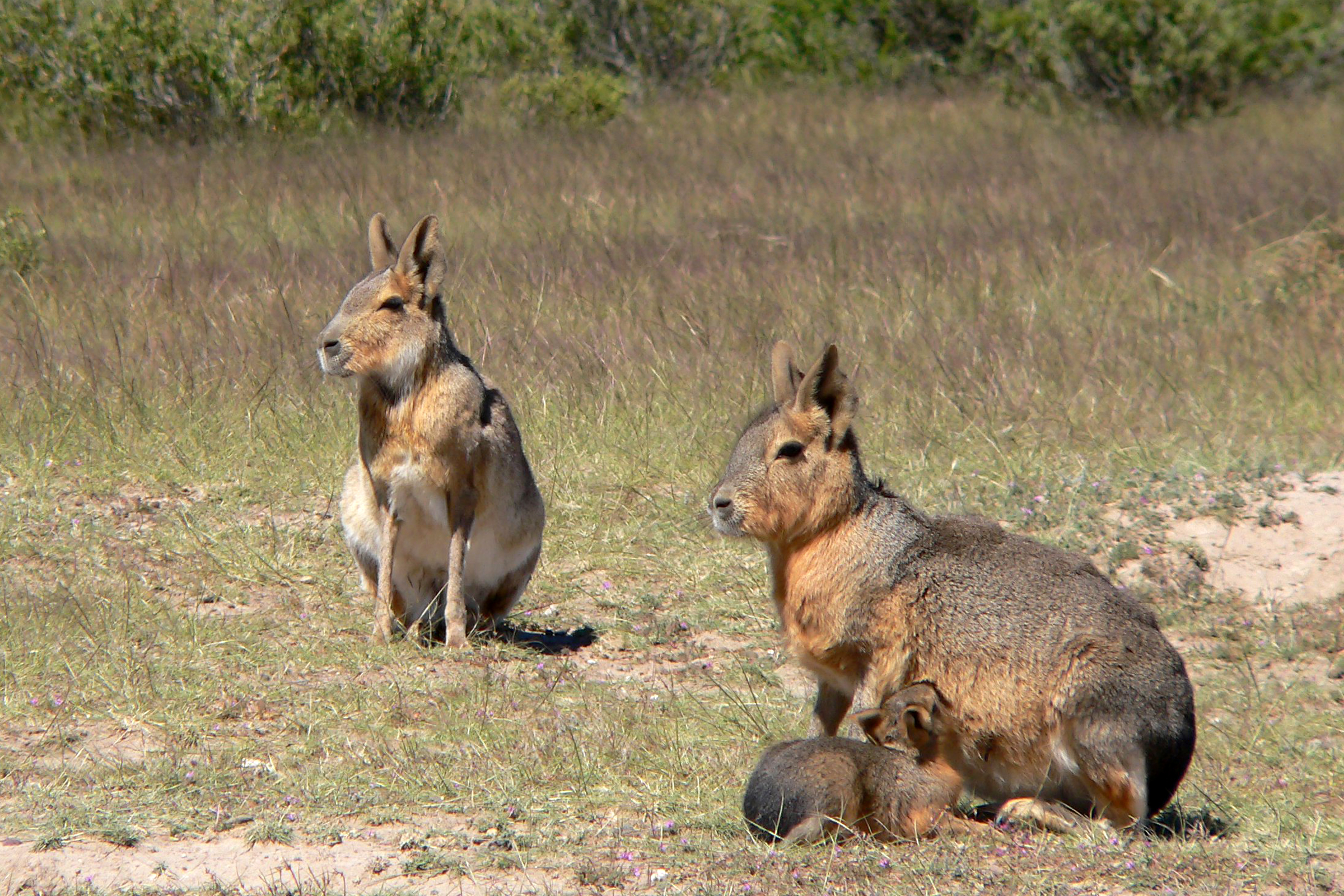
Two Patagonian maras with young, an example of a monogamous and communal nesting species

Mother rodents provide both direct parental care (such as nursing, feeding, grooming, warmth, transportation, socialization, and expelling) and indirect parenting (such as food storing, nest building, and protection) to their offspring. In many social species, young may be cared for by individuals other than their parents, a practice known as alloparenting or cooperative breeding. This is known to occur in black-tailed prairie dogs and Belding's ground squirrels, where mothers have communal nests and nurse unrelated young along with their own. There is some question as to whether these mothers can distinguish which young are theirs. In the Patagonian mara, young are also placed in communal warrens, but mothers do not permit youngsters other than their own to nurse.

Infanticide exists in numerous rodent species and may be practiced by adult conspecifics of either sex. Several reasons have been proposed for this behavior, including nutrition, resource competition, avoiding caring for alien young, and, in the case of males, attempting to make the mother sexually receptive. The latter reason is more studied in primates and lions. Infanticide appears to be widespread in black-tailed prairie dogs, accounting for around half of litter deaths and usually done by resident, lactating females. To protect against infanticide from other adults, female rodents may employ avoidance or direct aggression (including in groups) against potential perpetrators, multiple mating, territoriality, or early abortions. In alpine marmots, dominant females tend to suppress the reproduction of subordinates by harassing them while they are pregnant. The resulting stress decreases their reproductive health.

=== Intelligence ===
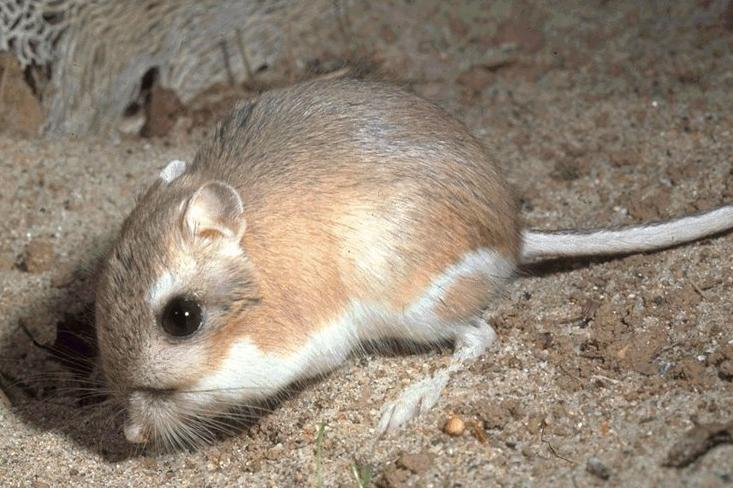
Kangaroo rats can locate food caches by spatial memory.

Rodents have advanced cognitive abilities. They can recognize poisoned baits, making pest control difficult. Guinea pigs can learn and remember complex pathways to food. Squirrels and kangaroo rats are able to locate caches of food by spatial memory, rather than just by smell.

Because laboratory mice (house mice) and rats (brown rats) are widely used as scientific models to further our understanding of biology, a great deal has come to be known about their cognitive capacities. Brown rats exhibit cognitive bias, where information processing is biased by whether they are in a positive or negative affective state. For example, laboratory rats trained to respond to a specific tone by pressing a lever to receive a reward, and to press another lever in response to a different tone so as to avoid receiving an electric shock, are more likely to respond to an intermediate tone by choosing the reward lever if they have just been tickled (something they enjoy), indicating "a link between the directly measured positive affective state and decision making under uncertainty in an animal model".

Laboratory (brown) rats may have the capacity for metacognition—to consider their own learning and then make decisions based on what they know, or do not know, as indicated by choices they make, apparently trading off difficulty of tasks and expected rewards, making them the first animals other than primates known to have this capacity, but these findings are disputed, since the rats may have been following simple operant conditioning principles or a behavioral economic model. Brown rats use social learning in a wide range of situations, but perhaps especially so in acquiring food preferences.

== Evolutionary history ==
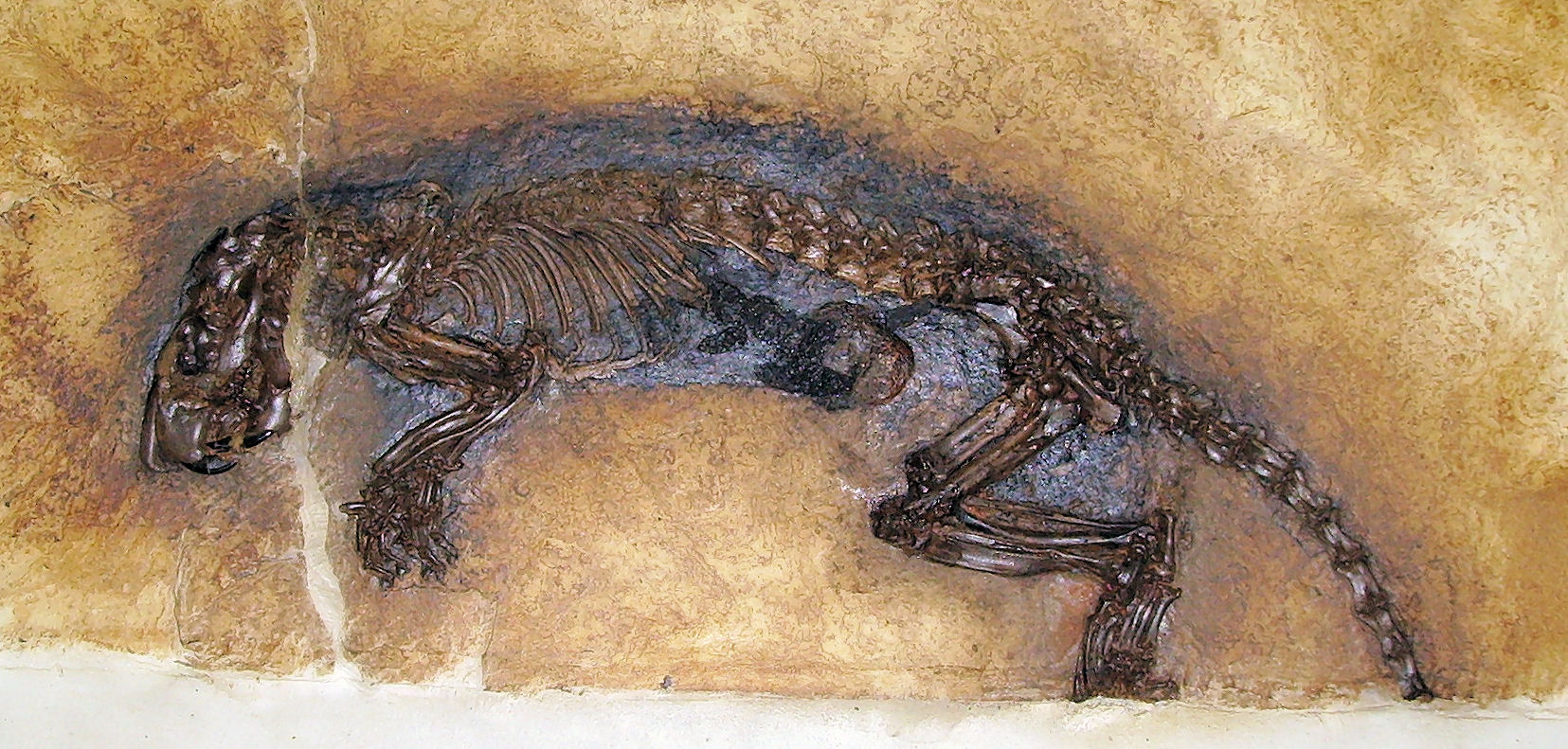
Masillamys sp. fossil from the Messel Pit fossil site, Germany

The earliest fossil record of mammals with the characteristic rodent dentition comes from the Paleocene, shortly after the extinction of the non-avian dinosaurs some 66 million years ago. These fossils are found in Laurasia, the supercontinent composed of modern-day North America, Europe, and Asia. The divergence of Glires, a clade consisting of rodents and lagomorphs (rabbits, hares, and pikas), from other placental mammals occurred within a few million years after the Cretaceous-Paleogene boundary; rodents and lagomorphs then spread during the Cenozoic. Some molecular clock data suggest modern rodents (members of the order Rodentia) had appeared by the late Cretaceous, although other molecular divergence estimations are in agreement with the fossil record. Rodents may have outcompeted and replaced multituberculates, but this is debated.

Fossils of an early ancestor of the sciuromorph rodents, Acritoparamys atavus, have been found in the deposits of early Paleocene North America, and sciuromorphs were widespread by the late Eocene. The Castoridae, which includes modern beavers, first appeared in North America in the late Eocene and colonized Eurasia via the Bering Land Bridge in the early Oligocene. Late in the Eocene, hystricognaths invaded Africa, most probably having originated in Asia at least 39.5 million years ago. From Africa, fossil evidence shows that some hystricognaths (caviomorphs) colonized South America, which was an isolated continent at the time, evidently making use of ocean currents to cross the Atlantic on floating debris. Caviomorphs had arrived in South America by 41 million years ago (implying a date at least as early as this for hystricognaths in Africa) and reached the Greater Antilles by the early Oligocene.

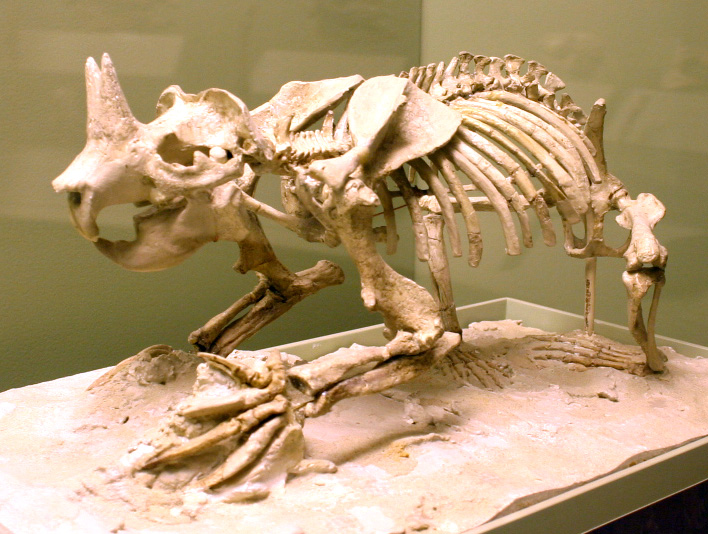
The horned gopher Ceratogaulus hatcheri, a burrowing mammal of the late Miocene to early Pleistocene, is the only known horned rodent.

By 20 million years ago, fossils recognizably belonging to the current families, such as Muridae, could be found. Muroids may have originated in Eurasia and recolonized it up to ten more times. There is also evidence for up to seven colonizations of Africa, five of North America, four of Southeast Asia, and two of South America. Nesomyid rodents are thought to have rafted from Africa to Madagascar 20–24 million years ago. Some fossil rodents were very large in comparison to modern species; the largest known rodent was Josephoartigasia monesi, a pacarana that may have reached a length of 3 m (10 ft) and weight of 1,000 kg (2,200 lb). This animal lived 4–2 mya.

Although marsupials are the most prominent mammals in Australia, many rodents, all belonging to Muridae, are among the continent's mammal species. Fossil evidence suggests that rodents inhabited Australia as early as 4.5 million years ago. Species include the Hydromyini, 'old endemics', the first wave of rodents to colonize the country in the Miocene and early Pliocene, and the true rat (Rattus), 'new endemics', arriving in a subsequent wave in the late Pliocene or early Pleistocene. Molecular evidence supports one origin for 'old endemic' rodents in both Australia and New Guinea.

Rodents participated in the Great American Interchange that resulted from the joining of the Americas by the formation of the Isthmus of Panama, around 5 million years ago in the Piacenzian age. In this exchange, a small number of species such as the New World porcupines (Erethizontidae) headed north while murids migrated south. However, the main southward invasion of sigmodontines preceded the formation of the land bridge by at least several million years, probably occurring via rafting. Sigmodontines diversified explosively once in South America, although some degree of diversification may have already occurred in Central America before the colonization.

== Classification ==
The use of the order name "Rodentia" is attributed to the English traveler and naturalist Thomas Edward Bowdich (1821). The Modern Latin word Rodentia is derived from rōdēns, present participle of rōdere, rōdō 'to gnaw, eat away'. The phylogeny of the rodents places them with the hares, rabbits, and pikas (order Lagomorpha) in the clades Glires, in Euarchontoglires and Boreoeutheria. Lagomorphs share with rodents continuously growing incisors. However, they have an additional pair of incisors in the upper jaw. The cladogram below shows some of the inner and outer relations of Rodentia based on a 2012 attempt by Wu et al. to align the molecular clock with paleontological data:

- Boreoeutheria
  - Laurasiatheria
    - Eulipotyphla
    - Scrotifera
  - Euarchontoglires
    - Euarchonta
    - Glires
      - Lagomorpha
        - Ochotona (pikas)
        - Leporidae (rabbits and hares)
      - Rodentia
        - Hystricomorpha
          - Ctenodactylidae (gundis)
          - - Atherurus (brush-tailed porcupines)
            - - Octodontomys (mountain degus)
              - - Erethizontidae (New World porcupines)
                - Caviidae (guinea pigs and capybara)
        - - Sciuromorpha
            - Aplodontia (mountain beavers)
            - Sciuridae (squirrels)
              - Glaucomys (New World flying squirrels)
              - Tamias (chipmunks)
          - - Castorimorpha
              - Castor (beavers)
              - - Dipodomys (kangaroo rats)
                - Thomomys (pocket gophers)
            - Myomorpha
              - Muroidea
                - Cricetidae (hamsters and new world mice)
                - - Mus (true mice)
                  - Rattus (rats)
              - Dipodoidea
                - Sicista (birch mice)
                - - Zapus (jumping mice)
                  - Cardiocranius (pygmy jerboas)

The living rodent families (and a few illustrative genera) based on the study done by Fabre et al. 2012.

Rodentia classification

- Rodentia
  - Sciuromorpha
    - Gliridae
    - Sciurida
      - Aplodontidae
      - Sciuridae
  - - Ctenohystrica
      - Ctenodactylomorpha
        - Ctenodactylidae
        - Diatomyidae
      - Hystricognatha
        - Hystricidae
        - - Bathyergomorpha
            - Bathyergidae
            - - Petromuridae
              - Thryonomyidae
          - Caviida
            - Cavioidea
              - Erethizontidae
              - - Cuniculidae
                - - Caviidae
                  - Dasyproctidae
            - - Chinchilloidea
                - Dinomyidae
                - Chinchillidae
              - Octodontoidea
                - Abrocomidae
                - - Echimyidae
                  - - Ctenomyidae
                    - Octodontidae
    - - Castorimorpha
        - Castoroidea
          Castoridae
        - Geomyoidea
          - Heteromyidae
          - Geomyidae
      - - Anomaluromorpha
          - Anomaluridae
          - Pedetidae
        - Myomorpha
          - Dipodoidea
            Dipodidae
          - Muroidea
            - Platacanthomyidae
            - - Spalacidae
              - - Calomyscidae
                - - Nesomyidae
                  - - Cricetidae
                    - Muridae

The order Rodentia may be divided into suborders, infraorders, superfamilies, and families. There is a great deal of parallelism and convergence among rodents caused by the fact that they have tended to evolve to fill largely similar niches. This parallel evolution includes not only the structure of the teeth but also the infraorbital region of the skull (below the eye socket) and makes classification difficult as similar traits may not be due to common ancestry. Brandt (1855) was the first to propose dividing Rodentia into three suborders, Sciuromorpha, Hystricomorpha, and Myomorpha, based on the development of certain muscles in the jaw, and this system was widely accepted. Schlosser (1884) performed a comprehensive review of rodent fossils, mainly using the cheek teeth, and found that they fit into the classical system, but Tullborg (1899) proposed just two sub-orders, Sciurognathi and Hystricognathi. These were based on the degree of inflection of the lower jaw and were to be further subdivided into Sciuromorpha, Myomorpha, Hystricomorpha, and Bathyergomorpha. Matthew (1910) created a phylogenetic tree of New World rodents but did not include the more problematic Old World species. Further attempts at classification continued without agreement, with some authors adopting the classical three-suborder system and others Tullborg's two suborders.

These disagreements remain unresolved, nor have molecular studies fully resolved the situation, though they have confirmed the monophyly of the group and that the clade has descended from a common Paleocene ancestor. Carleton and Musser (2005) in Mammal Species of the World have provisionally adopted a five-suborder system: Sciuromorpha, Castorimorpha, Myomorpha, Anomaluromorpha, and Hystricomorpha. As of 2021, the American Society of Mammalogists recognizes 34 recent families containing more than 481 genera and 2277 species.

== Conservation ==
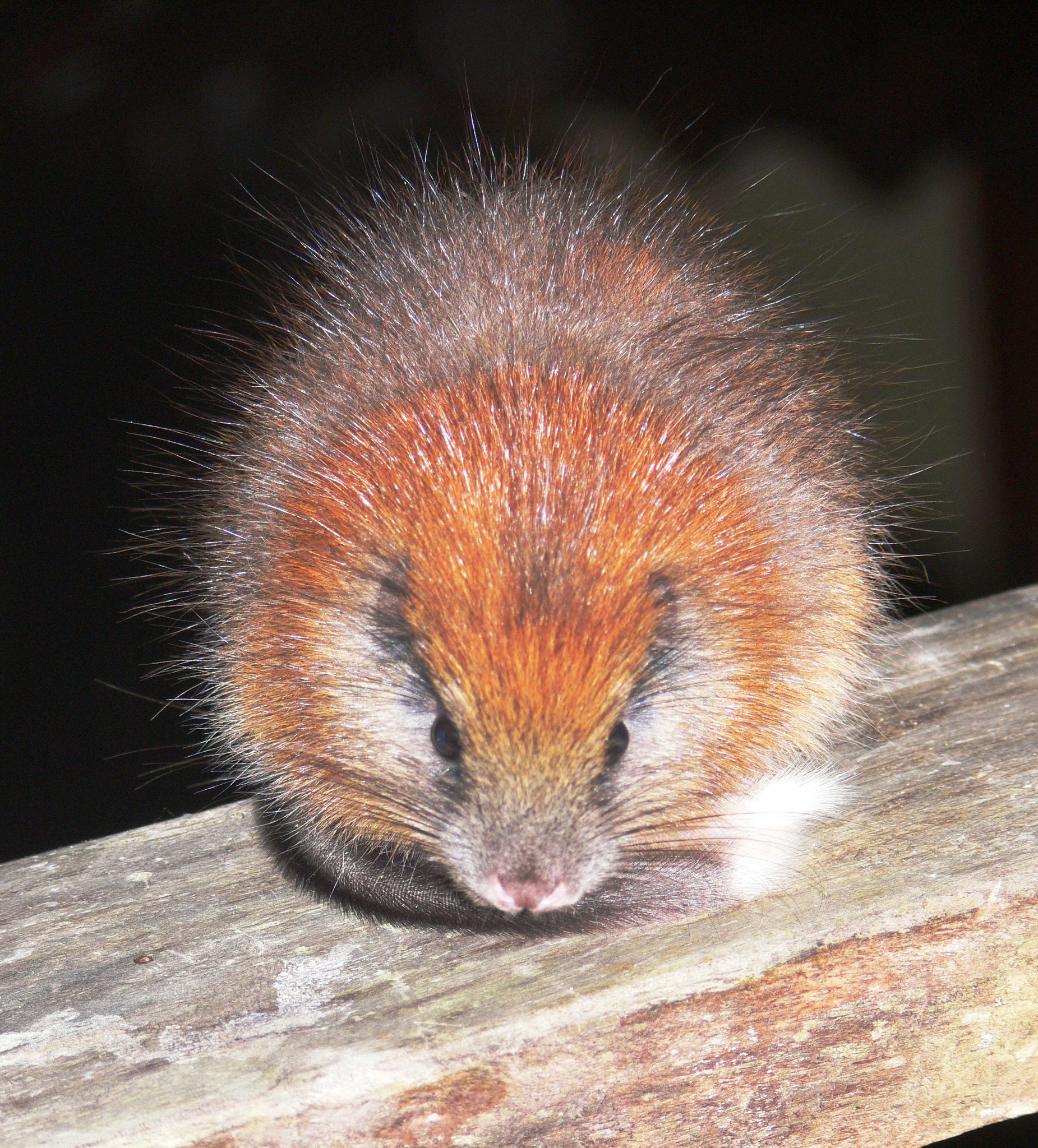
The critically endangered red-crested tree-rat

While threats to the order are not particularly severe, 168 species of rodent in 126 genera are said to warrant conservation attention in the face of limited value placed by the public. Since 76 percent of rodent genera contain only one species, much phylogenetic diversity could be lost with a comparatively small number of extinctions. In the absence of more detailed knowledge of species at risk and accurate taxonomy, conservation focuses mainly on protecting higher taxa (such as families rather than species) and geographical hot spots. Several species of rice rat have become extinct since the 19th century, probably through habitat loss and invasive species. The brown hairy dwarf porcupine and red-crested tree-rat are considered vulnerable due to being recorded in a few localities, the former having not been documented since 1925 and the latter recorded only in its type locality on the Caribbean coast. The IUCN Species Survival Commission writes, "We can safely conclude that many South American rodents are seriously threatened, mainly by environmental disturbance and intensive hunting."

The "three now cosmopolitan commensal rodent pest species" (the brown rat, the black rat, and the house mouse) have been dispersed in association with humans, partly on sailing ships in the Age of Exploration, and with a fourth species in the Pacific, the Polynesian rat (Rattus exulans), have severely damaged island biotas around the world. The black rat in particular caused the extinction of over 40 percent of the terrestrial bird species on Lord Howe Island just ten years after its arrival in 1918. They were similarly destructive on Midway Island (1943) and Big South Cape Island (1962). Conservation projects can, with careful planning, completely eradicate these pest rodents from islands using an anticoagulant rodenticide such as brodifacoum. This approach has been successful on the island of Lundy in the United Kingdom, where the killing of an estimated 40,000 brown rats is giving populations of Manx shearwater and Atlantic puffin a chance to recover from near-extinction.

Rodents have also been susceptible to climate change, especially species living on low-lying islands. The Bramble Cay melomys, which lived on a small island or cay in the Great Barrier Reef, was the first mammal species to be declared extinct as a consequence of human-caused climate change.

== Interaction with humans ==
=== Exploitation ===
==== Fur ====
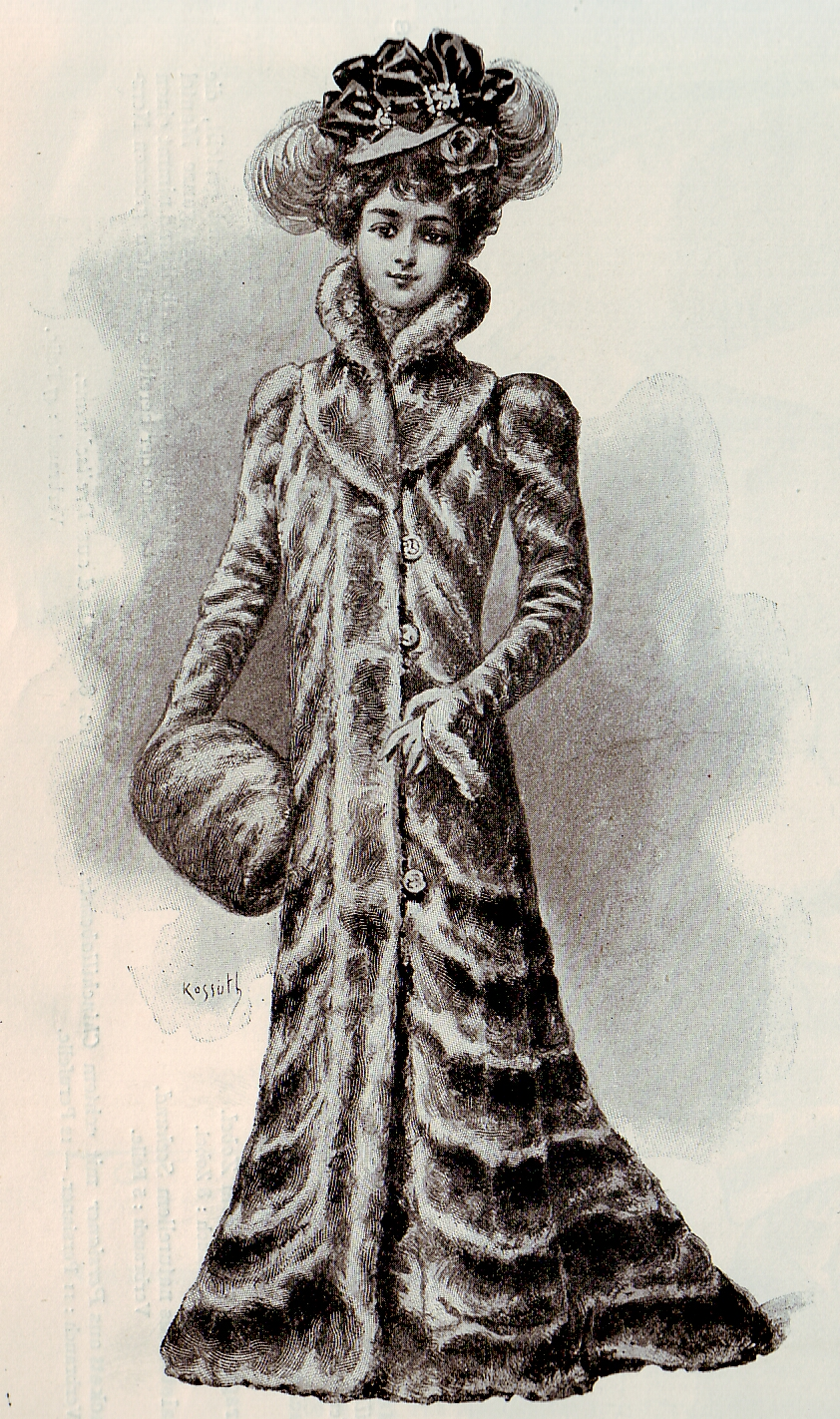
Chinchilla fur coat, exhibited at the 1900 Exposition Universelle, Paris

Humans globally have used rodent fur for clothing. The native people of North America made much use of beaver pelts, tanning and sewing them together to make robes. Europeans appreciated the quality of these, and the North American fur trade developed and became of prime importance to early settlers. In Europe, the soft underfur known as "beaver wool" was found to be ideal for felting and was used to make beaver hats and trimming for clothing. Later, the coypu took over as a cheaper source of fur for felting. The chinchilla has a soft coat, and demand for its fur was so high that it was nearly wiped out in the wild before farming became the main source of pelts. Porcupine quills are used in traditional decorative clothing, such as Native American headdresses. Lakota women would harvest the quills for quillwork by throwing a blanket over a porcupine and retrieving the quills it left stuck in the blanket. The main quills may be dyed and then tied to a hide or birch bark with tendons.

==== Consumption ====
Humans have eaten at least 89 species of rodent, such as guinea pigs, agoutis, and capybaras; in 1985, rats were consumed by at least 42 different societies. Guinea pigs were first raised for food around 2500 B.C., and by 1500 B.C., they had become the main source of meat for the Inca Empire. In Peru, guinea pigs are valued as a source of protein, with around 64 million pieces of meat produced from 20 million domestic guinea pigs annually. Dormice were farmed in ancient Rome, either in special pots called "gliraria" or in large outdoor enclosures, where they were fattened on walnuts, chestnuts, and acorns. Africans have similarly raised Gambian pouched rats and cane rats. Researchers found that in Amazonia, the annual game weight taken by indigenous people consisted of as much as 40 percent pacas and common agoutis where larger mammals were scarce. In the United States, the most commonly consumed rodent species are squirrels, but also include muskrats, porcupines, and groundhogs. Mud-baked prairie dogs were a food source for the Navajo people, while gophers, squirrels, and rats were eaten by the Paiute.

==== Animal testing ====
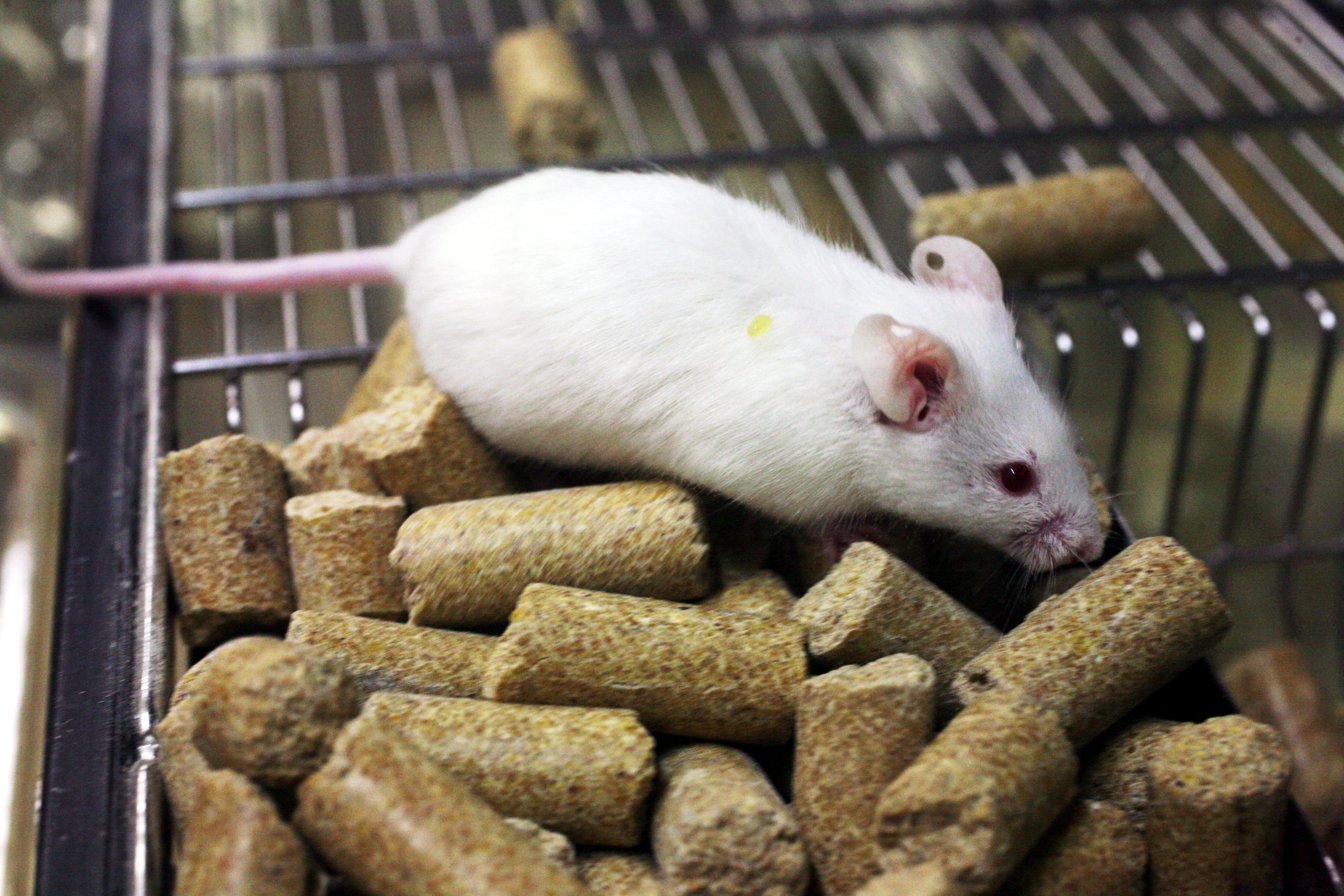
Laboratory house mouse

Rodents are widely used in animal testing. Albino mutant rats were first used for research in 1828 and later became the first animal domesticated for purely scientific purposes. Nowadays, the house mouse is the most commonly used laboratory rodent, and in 1979, it was estimated that fifty million were used annually worldwide. They are favored because of their small size, quick reproduction, and ease of handling and because they share many of the same conditions and infections as humans. They are used in research into genetics, developmental biology, cell biology, oncology, and immunology. Guinea pigs have been extensively used in scientific research as early as the 17th century. They have been used to study infectious diseases, being vulnerable to such pathogens and having a human-like immune system. They played important roles in the discovery of Mycobacterium tuberculosis as the cause of tuberculosis in 1882, while studies of their immune system first demonstrated an adaptive immunity against yellow fever. The animals were also the site of the discovery in 1907 of vitamin C which, like humans, they cannot produce on their own. In 2014, it was reported that "[c]omparatively fewer guinea pigs are used in research today, but the species is still commonly used in studies of the respiratory and hearing systems." They have been launched into orbital space flight several times—first by the USSR on the Sputnik 9 biosatellite of 9 March 1961, with a successful recovery. The naked mole-rat is of interest to biomedical research due to its long lifespan, high pain tolerance, and near immunity to cancer.

Rodents have sensitive olfactory abilities, which have been used by humans to detect odors or chemicals of interest. The Gambian pouched rat can detect tuberculosis bacilli with a sensitivity of up to 86.6% and determine their absence with an accuracy of 93%. The same species has also been trained to detect land mines. Rats have been studied for their potential use in hazardous situations, such as disaster zones. They can be trained to respond to commands, which may be given remotely, and even persuaded to venture into brighter or more open areas, contrary to their normal behavior.

=== As pets ===
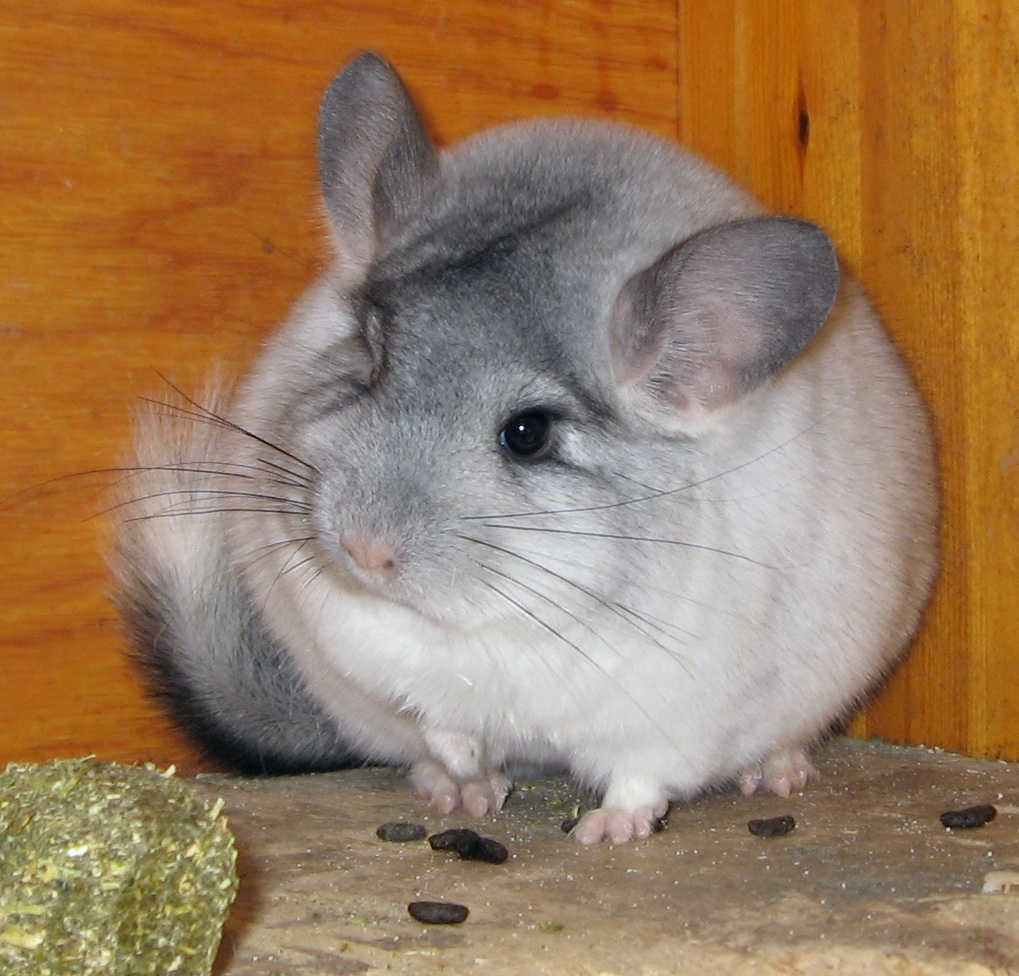
Pet chinchilla

Some rodent species are kept as pets, particularly rats, mice, hamsters, gerbils, guinea pigs, and chinchillas. They are attractive due to their appearance, intelligence, friendliness, and minimal odor. Conversely, their small size and space requirement, low maintenance cost, and easy purchase have also made them disposable, though this has changed in the 21st century as more pet rodents have been taken to veterinary clinics. Different species have particular needs; hamsters require more water, while guinea pigs must have dietary vitamin C. The size of pet rodents also makes them vulnerable to injury by poor handling.

=== As pests and disease vectors ===
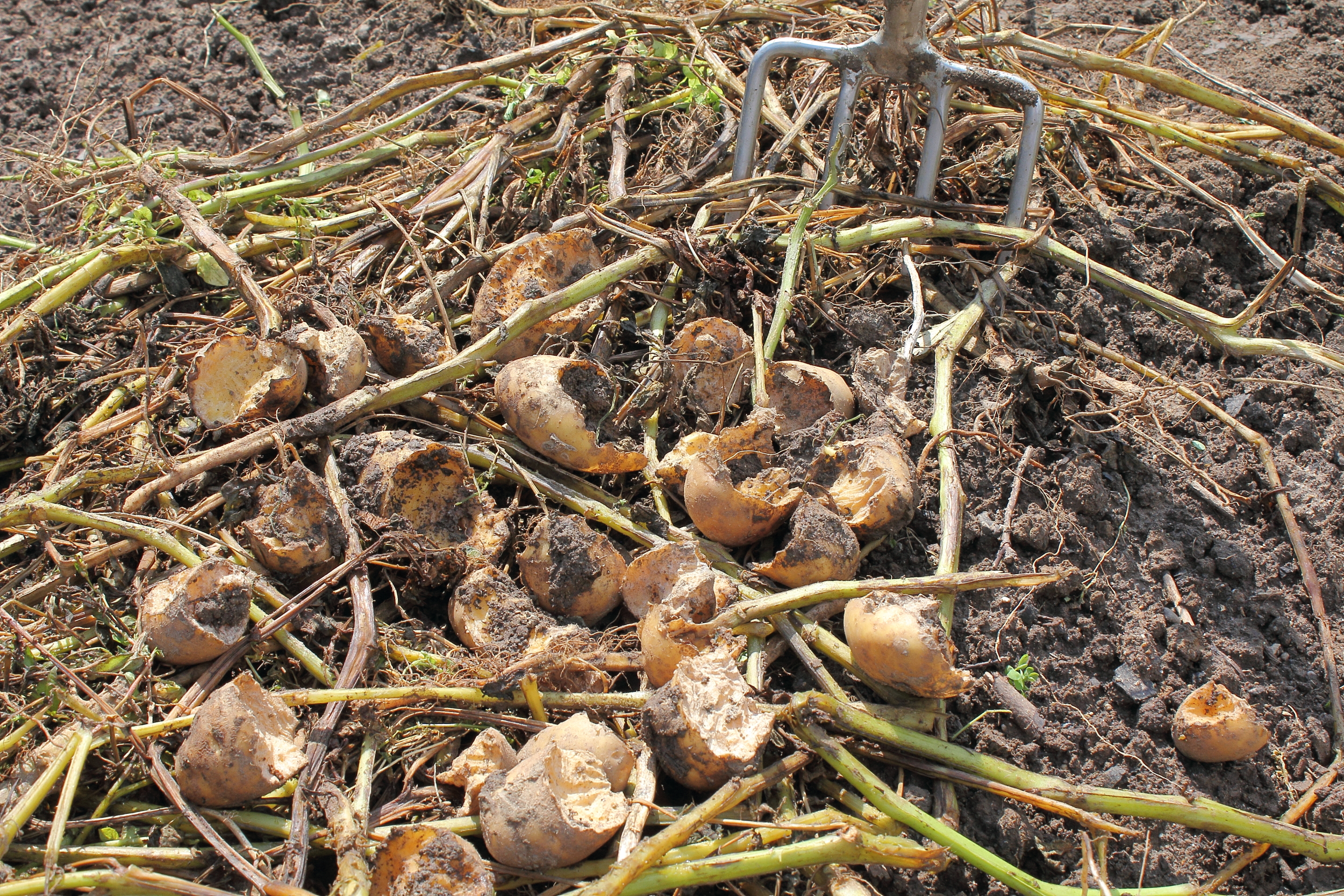
Rodents cause significant losses to crops, such as these potatoes damaged by voles.

Some rodent species are serious agricultural pests, eating large quantities of food stored by humans. For example, in 2003 the amount of crops lost to rats in Asia was estimated to have been enough to feed 200 million people. Most of the damage worldwide is caused by a relatively small number of species, chiefly rats and mice. In Indonesia and Tanzania, rodents reduce crop yields by around fifteen percent, while in South America, losses have reached ninety percent. Across Africa, rodents including Mastomys and Arvicanthis damage cereals, groundnuts, vegetables, and cacao. In Asia, rats, mice, and species such as Microtus brandti, Meriones unguiculatus, and Eospalax baileyi damage crops of rice, sorghum, tubers, vegetables, and nuts. In Europe, as well as rats and mice, species of Apodemus, Microtus and, in occasional outbreaks, Arvicola terrestris cause damage to orchards, vegetables, and pasture as well as cereals. In South America, a wider range of rodent species, such as Holochilus, Akodon, Calomys, Oligoryzomys, Phyllotis, Sigmodon, and Zygodontomys, damage many crops, including sugarcane, fruits, vegetables, and tubers.

Rodents are also significant vectors of disease. The black rat, with the fleas that it carries, plays a primary role in spreading the bacterium Yersinia pestis, responsible for bubonic plague, and carries the organisms responsible for typhus, Weil's disease, toxoplasmosis, and trichinosis. A number of rodents carry hantaviruses, including the Puumala, Dobrava, and Saaremaa viruses, which can infect humans. Rodents also help to transmit diseases, including babesiosis, cutaneous leishmaniasis, human granulocytic anaplasmosis, Lyme disease, Omsk hemorrhagic fever, Powassan virus, rickettsialpox, relapsing fever, Rocky Mountain spotted fever, and West Nile virus.

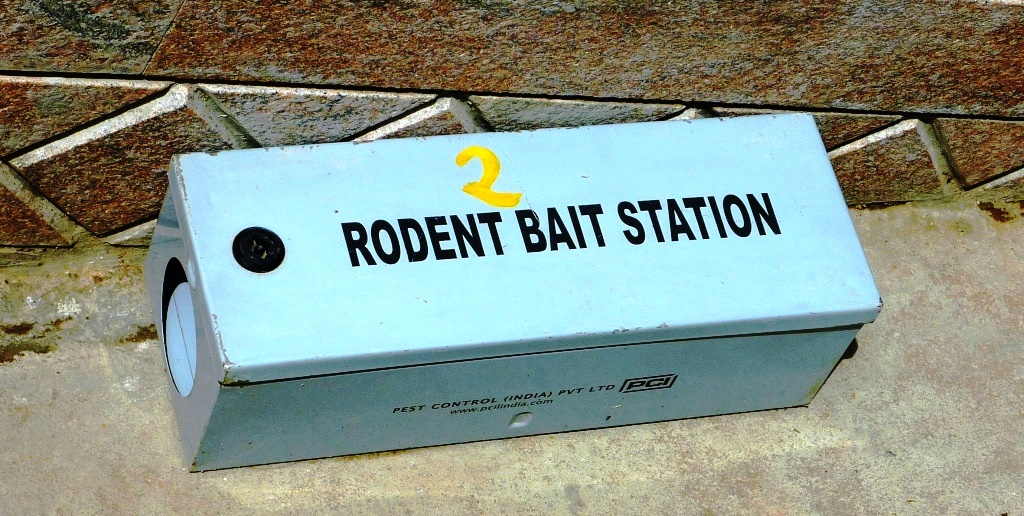
Rodent Bait Station, Chennai, India

Because rodents are a nuisance and endanger public health, human societies often attempt to control them. Traditionally, this involved poisoning and trapping, methods that were not always safe or effective. More recently, integrated pest management attempts to improve control with a combination of surveys to determine the size and distribution of the pest population, the establishment of tolerance limits (levels of pest activity at which to intervene), interventions, and evaluation of effectiveness based on repeated surveys. Interventions may include education, making and applying laws and regulations, modifying the habitat, changing farming practices, and biological control, as well as poisoning and trapping. The use of pathogens such as Salmonella has the drawback that they can infect humans and domestic animals, and rodents often become resistant. Domestic and feral cats are able to control rodents effectively, provided the rodent population is not too large. The use of other predators, including ferrets, mongooses, and monitor lizards, had "unsatisfactory" results.

== See also ==
- Rodentology
