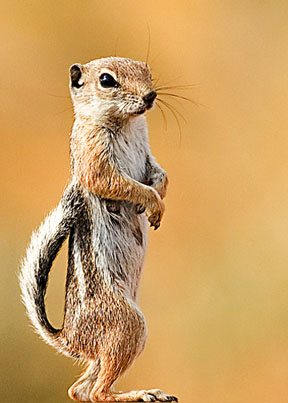
- Ammospermophilus leucurus

Scientific classification
- Kingdom: Animalia
- Phylum: Chordata
- Class: Mammalia
- Order: Rodentia
- Suborder: Sciuromorpha; Brandt, 1855

Families
- †Allomyidae; Aplodontiidae †Mylagaulidae; Sciuridae †Reithroparamyidae; Gliridae

= Sciuromorpha =

Sciuromorpha Temporal range: Late Paleocene to Recent

Suborder of mammals

Sciuromorpha (/sɪˈjuːrəmɔːrfə/ 'squirrel-like') is a rodent suborder that includes several rodent families. It includes all members of the Sciuridae (the squirrel family) as well as the mountain beaver species.

Traditionally, the term has been defined on the basis of the shape of the infraorbital canal. A sciuromorphous zygomasseteric system is characterized by attachment of the lateral masseter muscle along the side of the rostrum. Unlike hystricomorphous and myomorphous rodents, the medial masseter muscle does not pass through the infraorbital canal. Among extant rodents, only the families Sciuridae, Castoridae, Heteromyidae, and Geomyidae are truly sciuromorphous. Some authorities would exclude the Geomyidae and Heteromyidae from that list due to the attachment of the medial masseter directly behind the zygomatic arch.

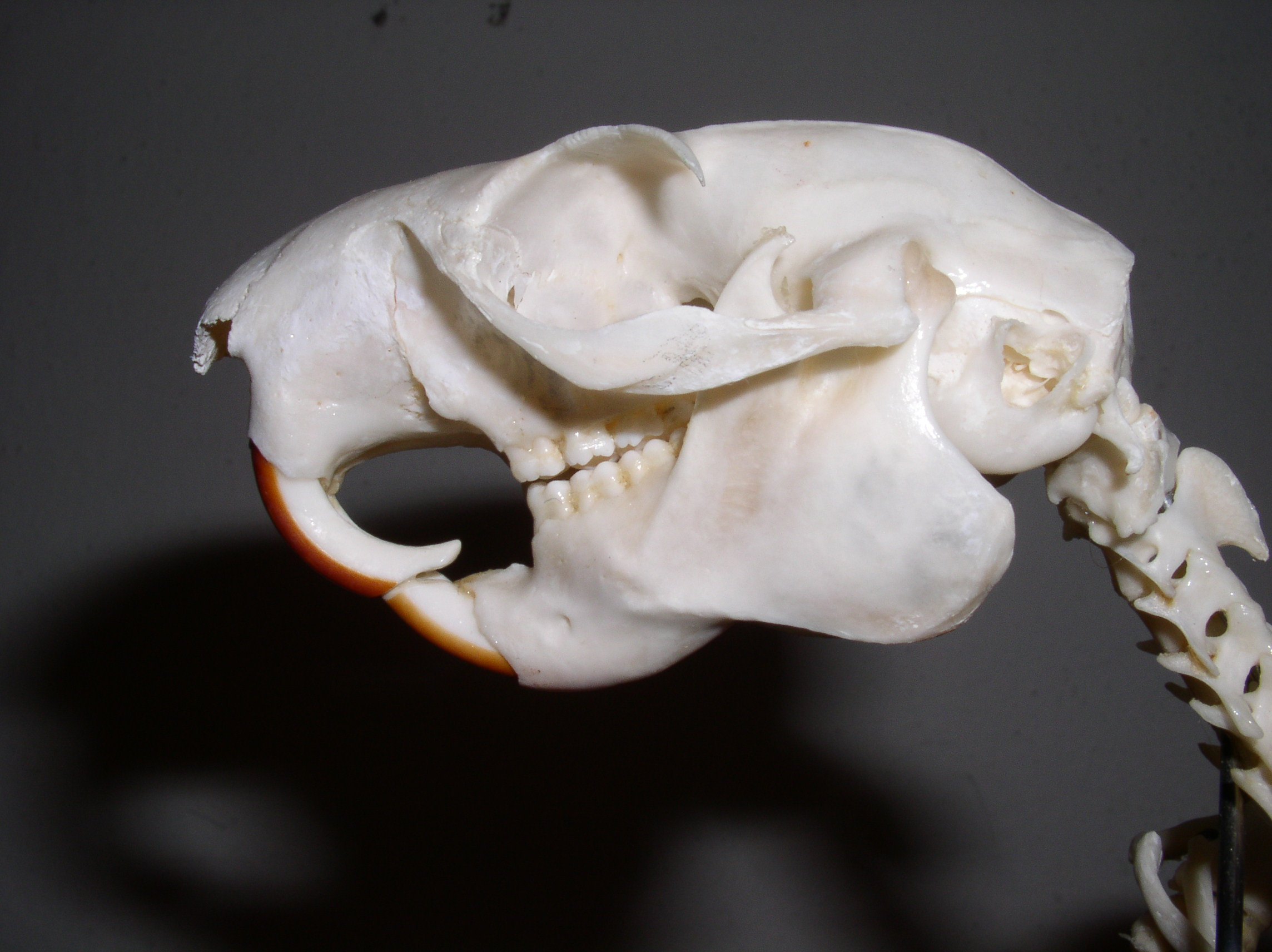
Skull of an oriental giant squirrel displaying a sciuromorphous zygomatic system

Carleton and Musser (2005) redefined the rodent suborders on morphological and molecular grounds. They defined the Sciuromorpha as including three families, Sciuridae, Aplodontiidae, and Gliridae. Of these, only the Sciuridae are truly sciuromorphous. The Aplodontiidae are protrogomorphous and the Gliridae are myomorphous. The connection between Aplodontiidae and Sciuridae has been proposed numerous times in the past. The two families have been united into a common infraorder (Sciurida) or superfamily (Sciuroidea). It has long been suggested that dormice (Gliridae) are not particularly related to the Myomorpha, and their zygomasseteric structure has been termed "pseudomyomorphy". The connection between squirrels and dormice has been almost exclusively suggested through genetic studies, and to a lesser degree via the fossil rodent Reithroparamys.

== Current families ==
The suborder Sciuromorpha contains 307 living species in 61 genera and three families. At least three extinct families are also recognised.

- † Allomyidae
- Aplodontiidae – mountain beaver
- † Mylagaulidae
- Sciuridae – squirrels, chipmunks, marmots, flying squirrels, etc.
- † Reithroparamyidae
- Gliridae – dormice

== Historical families ==
- Castoridae – beavers
- Geomyidae – pocket gophers
- Heteromyidae – pocket mice, kangaroo rats, and kangaroo mice
- Pedetidae – springhares
- Anomaluridae – anomalures

== Other Sources ==
- Carleton, M. D. and G. G. Musser (2005). "Order Rodentia". pp. 745–752 in Mammal Species of the World A Taxonomic and Geographic Reference (D. E. Wilson and D. M. Reeder eds.). Baltimore: Johns Hopkins University Press.
