= African land mammal age =

The African land mammal ages (AFLMA) system is a geologic timescale for African land mammal faunas of the Cenozoic Era. Based on biostratigraphic systems in use for mammal fossils on other continents, each AFLMA is defined at its base by a type locality with a distinctive fauna, rather than any particular species. Faunal zones have been in use in Cenozoic African paleontology since the 1980s, but the comprehensive AFLMA system was only established in 2020.

== List of AFLMAs ==
AFLMAs from youngest (stratigraphically highest) to oldest (stratigraphically lowest):
ALFMA	Age (million years ago)	Global epoch / stage	Type locality	Namesake	First appearances in Africa	Last appearances in Africa
Naivashan	0.0 – 1.0	Middle-late Pleistocene, Holocene	Olorgesailie bed I, Kenya	Lake Naivasha, Kenya	Homo sapiens (modern humans)	Ursidae (bears)
Natronian	1.0 – 2.0	Early Pleistocene	Olduvai Gorge bed I, Tanzania	Lake Natron, Tanzania		†Deinotheriidae (elephant relatives); †Mammutidae (elephant relatives); †Gomphotheriidae (elephant relatives); †Chalicotheriidae (chalicotheres)
Shunguran	2.0 – 3.6	Late Pliocene – Early Pleistocene	Shungura Formation member A, Omo Valley, Ethiopia	Shungura Formation	Homo (humans)	†Anthracotheriidae (hippo relatives)
Kerian	3.6 – 5.3	Early Pliocene (Zanclean)	Chemeron Formation, Tugen Hills, Kenya	Kerio Valley, Kenya	Pholidota? (pangolins)	†Stegodontidae (elephant relatives)
Baringian	5.3 – 6.8	Late Miocene	Mpesida beds, Kenya	Lake Baringo, Kenya	Camelidae (camels and kin); Australopithecines (human-like apes)	†Amphicyonidae ("bear-dogs")
Sugutan	6.8 – 10.0	Late Miocene	Nakali site, Kenya	Suguta Valley, Kenya	†Stegodontidae (elephant relatives); Elephantidae (elephants); Hominidae (great apes); Cercopithecidae (modern Old World monkeys, probable Oligocene origin); Leporidae (rabbits and hares); Canidae (dogs and kin)	†Dendropithecidae (early apes); †Percrocutidae (hyena relatives)
Tugenian	10.0 – 12.8	Middle-late Miocene	Ngorora Formation member A, Kenya	Tugen Hills, Kenya	Procaviidae (modern hyraxes); Hystricidae (Old World porcupines); Cricetidae (hamsters, voles, and kin); Equidae (horses)	†Ptolemaiida (carnivorous afrotheres); †Victoriapithecidae (early monkeys); †Climacoceratidae (giraffe relatives); †Hyaenodonta (early relatives of carnivorans); †Barbourofelidae ("false saber-toothed cats")
Tinderetian	12.8 – 15.8	Middle Miocene	Muruyur beds, Kenya	Tinderet volcano, Kavirondo rift valley, Kenya	Gliridae (dormice); Soricidae (Shrews); †Percrocutidae (hyena relatives); Hyaenidae (Hyenas)	†Diamantomyidae (early hystricognath rodents); †Myophiomyidae (early hystricognath rodents); †Sanitheriidae (pig relatives); †Gelocidae (chevrotain relatives)
Kisingirian	15.8 – 18.5	Early Miocene	Kiahera Formation, Rusinga Island, Kenya	Kisingiri volcano, Kavirondo rift valley, Kenya	Ctenodactylidae (gundis); Dipodidae (Jerboas); Muridae (true mice and kin); Spalacidae (African mole-rats and kin); Bovidae (Antelopes and kin); †Amphicyonidae ("bear-dogs"); Ursidae (bears); Mustelidae (weasels and kin); Herpestidae (Mongooses); Felidae (cats)	†Phiomyidae (early hystricognath rodents); †Kenyamyidae (early hystricognath rodents); †Stenoplesictidae (early feliforms)
Legetetian	18.5 – 22.5	Early Miocene	Tonde Bridge site, Kenya	Legetet Hill, Kavirondo rift valley, Kenya	Tubulidentata (Aardvarks); Pedetidae (springhares); †Kenyamyidae (early hystricognath rodents); Bathyergidae (Blesmols); Sciuridae (Squirrels); Nesomyidae (climbing mice and kin); Ochotonidae (Pikas); Erinaceidae (hedgehogs and kin); †Sanitheriidae (pig relatives); Suidae (pigs); Hippopotamidae (hippos); Tragulidae (Chevrotains); †Gelocidae (chevrotain relatives); Giraffidae (giraffes, Okapis and kin); †Climacoceratidae (giraffe relatives); Viverridae (Civets, genets, and kin); †Barbourofelidae ("false saber-toothed cats"); †Chalicotheriidae (chalicotheres); Rhinocerotidae (rhinos)	†Embrithopoda (large hebivorous afrotheres)
Turkwelian	22.5 – 28.2	Late Oligocene	Chilga area, Ethiopia	Turkwel River, Kenya	†Deinotheriidae (elephant relatives); †Mammutidae (elephant relatives); †Gomphotheriidae (elephant relatives); †Victoriapithecidae (early monkeys); †Dendropithecidae (early apes); †Stenoplesictidae (early feliforms)	†Parapithecidae (early monkeys)
Qatranian	28.2 – 33.4	Early Oligocene	L-41 site, Jebel Qatrani Formation, Fayum area, Egypt	Jebel Qatrani Formation	Pholidota? (pangolins, tentative oldest ID); †Proteopithecidae (early monkeys; †Propliopithecidae (early monkeys)	†Herpetotheriidae (marsupial relatives); †Numidotheriidae (early elephant relatives); †Djebelemuridae (lemur relatives); †Adapidae (lemur relatives); †Proteopithecidae (early monkeys); †Propliopithecidae (early monkeys); †Oligopithecidae (early monkeys)
Phiomian	33.4 – 37.0	late Eocene (Priabonian)	BQ-2 site, Birket Qarun Formation, Fayum area, Egypt	Fayum	†Herpetotheriidae (marsupial relatives); †Ptolemaiida (carnivorous afrotheres); Galagidae (Galagos); †Parapithecidae (early monkeys); †Oligopithecidae (early monkeys); Anomaluridae (anomalure rodents); †Phiomyidae (early hystricognath rodents); †Diamantomyidae (early hystricognath rodents); †Myophiomyidae (early hystricognath rodents); †Anthracotheriidae (hippo relatives)	
Kebarian	37.0 – 39.5	Middle Eocene	KEB-1 site, Jebel el-Kébar area, Tunisia	Jebel el-Kébar	Thryonomyidae (cane rats); Anthropoidea (monkeys, estimated)	
Lazibian	39.5 – 48.6	Middle Eocene	HGL49 site, Hammada du Dra Formation, Gour Lazib area, Algeria	Gour Lazib	Tenrecomorpha (tenrecs and relatives); Chrysochloridae (Golden moles); Macroscelidea (Elephant shrews); †Djebelemuridae (lemur relatives); †Azibiidae (lemur relatives); †Adapidae (lemur relatives); †Zegdoumyidae (early anomaluromorph rodents); Chiroptera (bats)	†Azibiidae (lemur relatives); †Zegdoumyidae (early anomaluromorph rodents)
Abdounian	48.6 – 56.0	Early Eocene (Ypresian)	Ouled Abdoun phosphorite bed I, Morocco	Ouled Abdoun Basin	Hyracoidea (Hyraxes); †Embrithopoda (large herbivorous afrotheres)	†Ocepeiidae (early afrotheres)
Tingitanian	56.0 – 66.0	Paleocene	Ouled Abdoun phosphorite bed II, Morocco	Tingitana (Morocco)	†Ocepeiidae (early afrotheres); †Numidotheriidae (early elephant relatives); Primates? (Altiatlasius); †Hyaenodonta (early relatives of carnivorans)	

== Other continental ages ==
- North American land mammal age
- South American land mammal age
- European land mammal age
- Asian land mammal age
