= Elmerimys =

Elmerimys Temporal range: Early - Middle Miocene

Scientific classification
- Domain: Eukaryota
- Kingdom: Animalia
- Phylum: Chordata
- Class: Mammalia
- Order: Rodentia
- Family: †Myophiomyidae
- Subfamily: †Myophiomyinae
- Genus: †Elmerimys; Lavocat, 1973

Extinct genus of rodents

Elmerimys is an extinct genus of rodent known from Miocene fossils found in Africa.
