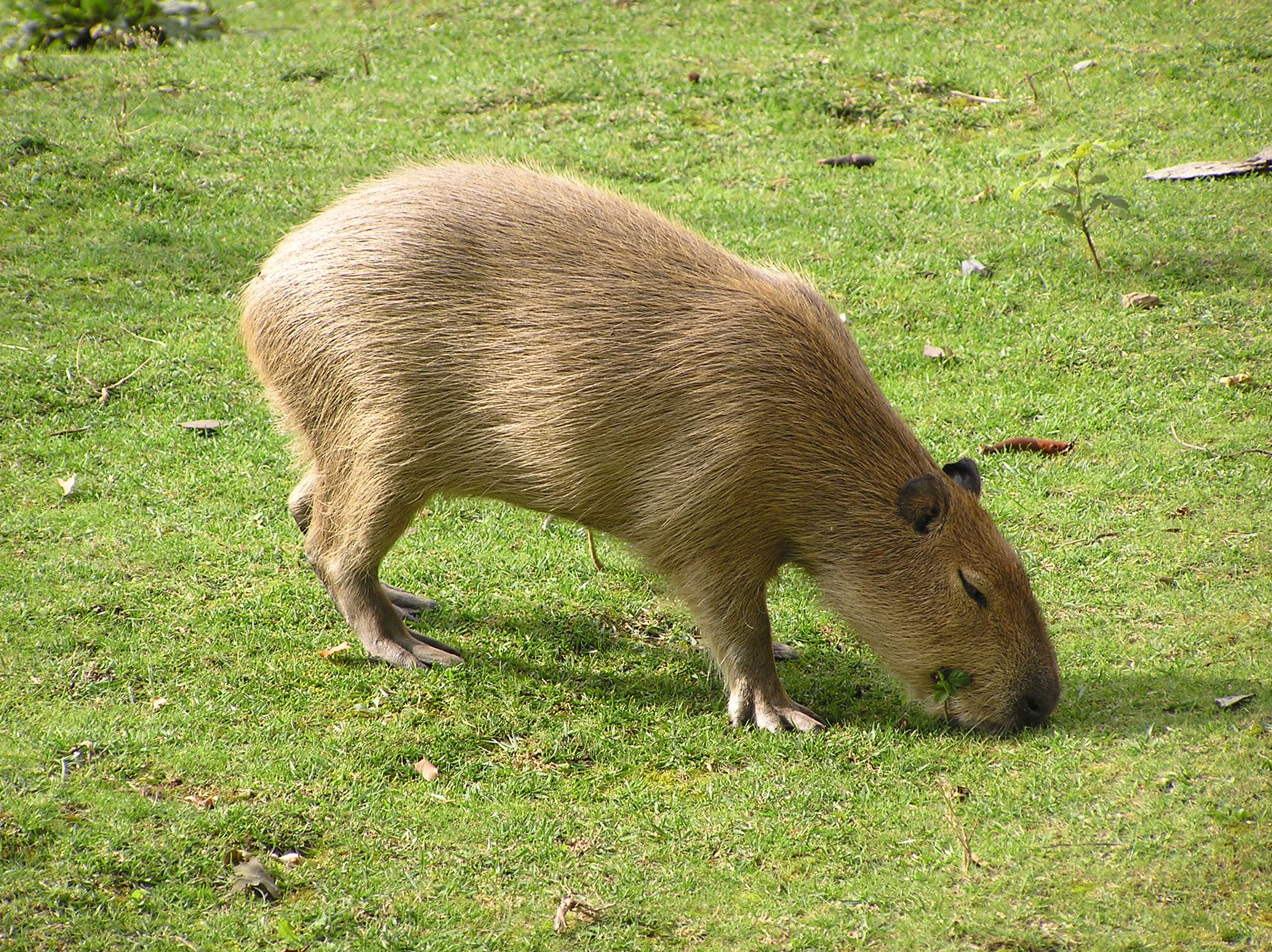
- Capybara
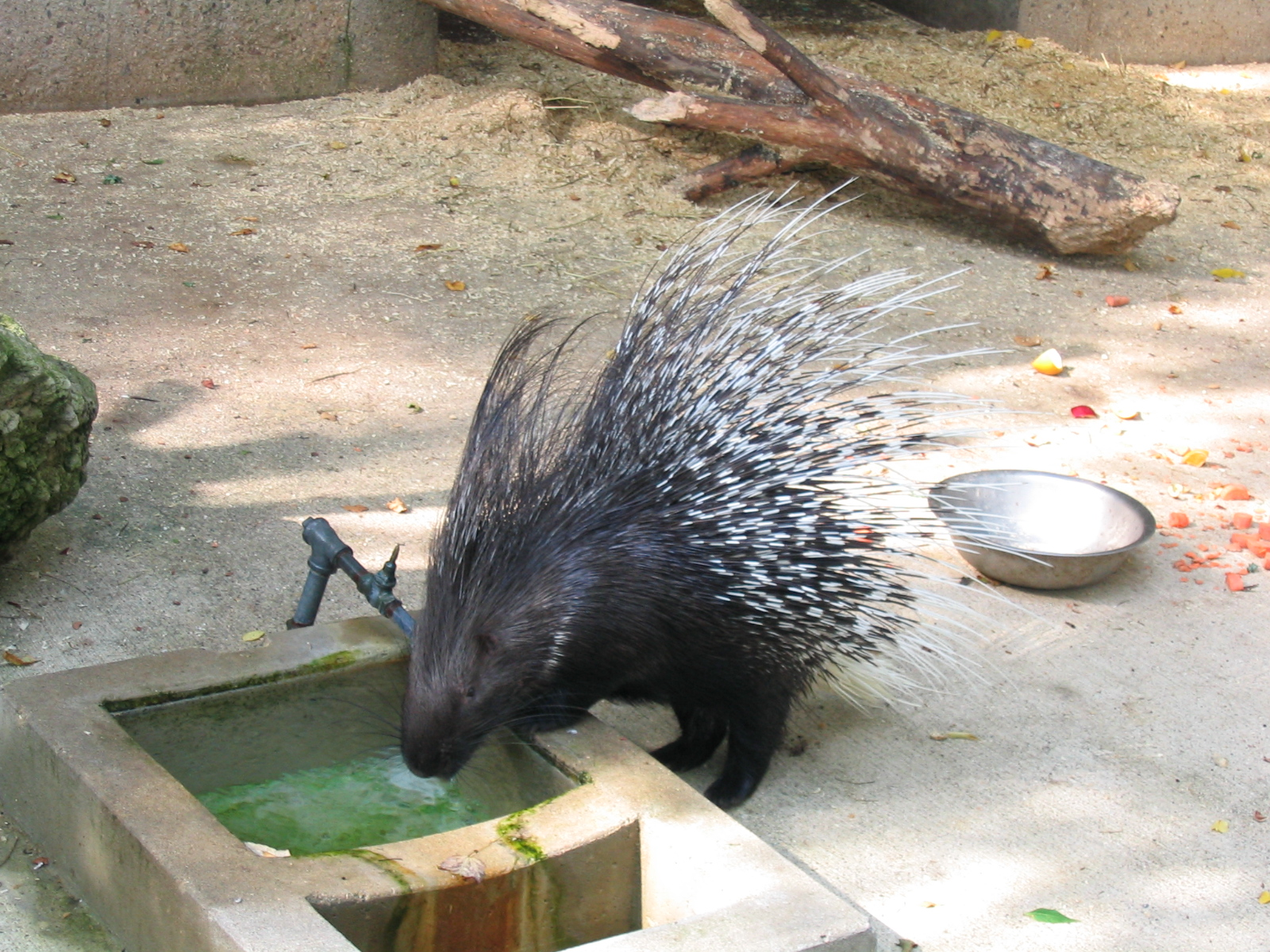
- Indian crested porcupine

Scientific classification
- Kingdom: Animalia
- Phylum: Chordata
- Class: Mammalia
- Infraclass: Placentalia
- Order: Rodentia
- Suborder: Hystricomorpha; Brandt, 1855

Superfamilies
- See text

Synonyms
- Caviomorpha

= Hystricomorpha =

Hystricomorpha Temporal range: Eocene to recent,

Suborder of rodents

Hystricomorpha (from Ancient Greek ὕστριξ, (hústrix), meaning "porcupine", and μορφή (morphḗ), meaning "form") is a term referring to families and orders of rodents which has had many definitions throughout its history. In the broadest sense, it refers to any rodent (except dipodoids) with a hystricomorphous zygomasseteric system. This includes the Hystricognathi, Ctenodactylidae, Anomaluridae, and Pedetidae. Molecular and morphological results suggest the inclusion of the Anomaluridae and Pedetidae in Hystricomorpha may be suspect. Based on Carleton & Musser 2005, these two families are discussed here as representing a distinct suborder Anomaluromorpha.

== Classification ==
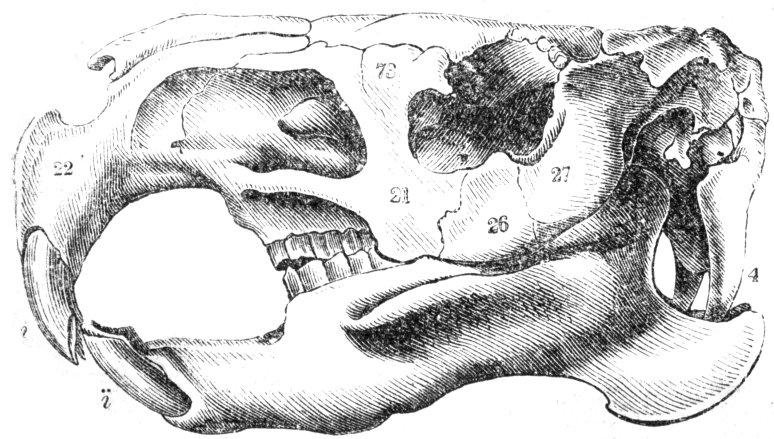
Cranium of a capybara showing the enlarged infraorbital canal present in most members of the Hystricomorpha: This condition is termed hystricomorphy.

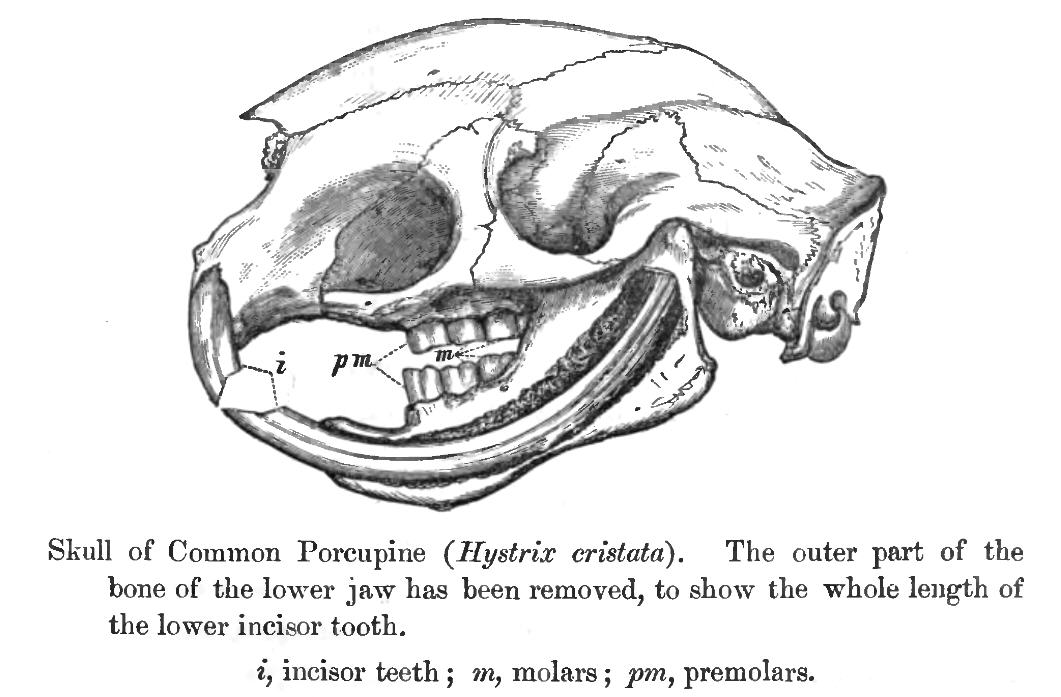
Cranium of a crested porcupine showing the enlarged infraorbital canal present in most members of the Hystricomorpha: This condition is termed hystricomorphy.

The modern definition of Hystricomorpha, also known as Entodacrya or Ctenohystrica, is a taxonomic hypothesis uniting the gundis with the hystricognath rodents. Considerable morphological and strong molecular support exists for this relationship. If true, this hypothesis renders the traditional view of Sciurognathi invalid, as it becomes a paraphyletic group.

The hystricomorph rodents, or at least members of Caviomorpha, are sometimes not regarded as rodents. Most molecular and genetic research, however, confirms the monophyly of rodents. Support for rodent polyphyly appears to be a product of long branch attraction.

Hystricomorph rodents appeared in South America in the Eocene, a continent which previously had metatherians, xenarthrans, and meridiungulates as the only resident nonflying mammals. They apparently arrived by rafting across the Atlantic from Africa. The same type of migration may have occurred with primates, which also appeared in South America in the Eocene when it was an isolated continent, long before the Great American Interchange. All of this is still controversial, and new scientific discoveries on this subject are published regularly.

== Families ==
The following list of families is based on the taxonomy of Marivaux et al. 2002 and Marivaux, Vianey-Liaud & Jaeger 2004, who subjected a number of early fossil rodents to parsimony analysis and recovered support for the Hystricomorpha or Entodacrya hypothesis. Their results rendered the suborder Sciuravida as defined by McKenna & Bell 1997 to be polyphyletic and invalid. The symbol "†" is used to indicate extinct groups.

- Suborder Hystricomorpha
  - †Pseudoneoreomys?
  - Superfamily Ctenodactyloidea
    - †Chapattimyidae
    - Ctenodactylidae – gundis
    - Diatomyidae – Laotian rock rat
    - †Tamquammyidae
    - †Yuomyidae
  - Hystricognathiformes
    - †Tsaganomyidae
    - Hystricognathi – true hystricognaths
      - †Baluchimyinae
      - Hystricidae – Old World porcupines
      - Phiomorpha
        - Bathyergidae – blesmols
        - †Bathyergoididae
        - †Diamantomyidae
        - Heterocephalidae – naked mole-rats
        - †Kenyamyidae
        - †Myophiomyidae
        - Petromuridae – dassie rat
        - †Phiomyidae
        - Thryonomyidae – cane rats
      - Caviomorpha – New World hystricognaths
        - Superfamily Cavioidea
          - Caviidae – cavies, capybaras, and guinea pigs
          - †Cephalomyidae
          - Cuniculidae – pacas
          - Dasyproctidae – agoutis and acouchis
          - †Eocardiidae
          - †Neoepiblemidae
        - Superfamily Chinchilloidea
          - Chinchillidae – chinchillas and viscachas
          - Dinomyidae – pacarana
        - Superfamily Erethizontoidea
          - Erethizontidae – New World porcupines
        - Superfamily Octodontoidea
          - Abrocomidae – chinchilla rats
          - Ctenomyidae – tuco-tucos
          - Echimyidae – spiny rats, nutria and hutias
          - †Heptaxodontidae – giant hutias
          - Octodontidae – degus and relatives

== General references ==
- Bergsten, J. (2005). "A review of long-branch attraction". Cladistics. 21 (2): 163–193. doi:10.1111/j.1096-0031.2005.00059.x.
- Brandt, J. F. (1855). Beitrage zur nahern Kenntniss der Saugethiere Russlands (in German).
- Cao, Y.; Adachi, J.; Yano, T.; Hasegawa, M. (1994). "Phylogenetic place of guinea pigs: No support of the rodent-polyphyly hypothesis from maximum-likelihood analyses of multiple protein sequences". Molecular Biology and Evolution. 11 (4): 593–604. doi:10.1093/oxfordjournals.molbev.a040139. PMID 8078399.
- Carleton, M. D.; Musser, G. G. (2005). "Order Rodentia". In Wilson, D. E.; Reeder, D. M. (eds.). Mammal Species of the World A Taxonomic and Geographic Reference. Baltimore: Johns Hopkins University Press. pp. 745–752. ISBN 978-0-8018-8221-0.
- D'Erchia, A.; Gissi, C.; Pesole, G.; Saccone, C.; Arnason, U. (1996). "The guinea-pig is not a rodent". Nature. 381 (6583): 597–600. doi:10.1038/381597a0. PMID 8637593. S2CID 4336262.
- Flynn, J. J.; Wyss, A. R.; Croft, D. A.; Charrier, R. (2003). "The Tinguiririca Fauna, Chile: biochronology, paleoecology, biogeography, and a new earliest Oligocene South American Land Mammal 'Age'". Palaeogeography, Palaeoclimatology, Palaeoecology. 195 (3–4). Elsevier: 229–259. doi:10.1016/S0031-0182(03)00360-2. ISSN 0031-0182.
- Graur, D.; Hide, W.; Li, W. (1991). "Is the guinea-pig a rodent?". Nature. 351 (6328): 649–652. doi:10.1038/351649a0. PMID 2052090. S2CID 4344039.
- Kuma, K.; Miyata, T. (1994). "Mammalian phylogeny inferred from multiple protein data" (PDF). Japanese Journal of Genetics. 69 (5): 555–66. doi:10.1266/jjg.69.555. PMID 7999372.
- Lin, Y.-H.; McLenachan, P. A.; Gore, A. R.; Phillips, M. J.; Ota, R.; Hendy, M. D.; Penny, D. (2002). "Four new mitochondrial genomes and the increased stability of evolutionary trees of mammals from improved taxon sampling". Molecular Biology and Evolution. 19 (12): 2060–2070. doi:10.1093/oxfordjournals.molbev.a004031. PMID 12446798.
- Marivaux, L.; Vianey-Liaud, M.; Jaeger, J.-J. (2004). "High-level phylogeny of early Tertiary rodents: dental evidence". Zoological Journal of the Linnean Society. 142 (1): 105–134. doi:10.1111/j.1096-3642.2004.00131.x.
- Marivaux, L.; Welcomme, J.-L.; Vianey-Liaud, M.; Jaeger, J.-J. (2002). "The role of Asia in the origin and diversification of hystricognathous rodents". Zoologica Scripta. 31 (3): 225–239. doi:10.1046/j.1463-6409.2002.00074.x. S2CID 86358222.
- McKenna, M. C.; Bell, S. K. (1997). Classification of Mammals Above the Species Level. New York: Columbia University Press. ISBN 0-231-11013-8.
- Reyes, A.; Pesole, G.; Saccone, C. (2000). "Long-branch attraction phenomenon and the impact of among-site rate variation on rodent phylogeny". Gene. 259 (1–2): 177–187. doi:10.1016/S0378-1119(00)00438-8. PMID 11163975.
- Reyes, A.; Gissi, C.; Catzeflis, F.; Nevo, E.; Pesole, G.; Saccone, C. (2004). "Congruent mammalian trees from mitochondrial and nuclear genes using Bayesian methods". Molecular Biology and Evolution. 21 (2): 397–403. doi:10.1093/molbev/msh033. hdl:2434/144391. PMID 14660685.
- Robinson-Rechavi, M.; Ponger, L.; Mouchiroud, D. (2000). "Nuclear gene LCAT supports rodent monophyly". Molecular Biology and Evolution. 17 (9): 1410–1412. doi:10.1093/oxfordjournals.molbev.a026424. ISSN 0737-4038. PMID 10960041.
- Sullivan, J.; Swofford, D. L. (1997). "Are Guinea Pigs Rodents? The Importance of Adequate Models in Molecular Phylogenetics" (PDF). Journal of Mammalian Evolution. 4 (2): 77–86. doi:10.1023/A:1027314112438. ISSN 1064-7554. S2CID 5756010.
