= Myophiomys =

Myophiomys Temporal range: Early Miocene

Scientific classification
- Domain: Eukaryota
- Kingdom: Animalia
- Phylum: Chordata
- Class: Mammalia
- Order: Rodentia
- Family: †Myophiomyidae
- Subfamily: †Myophiomyinae
- Genus: †Myophiomys; Lavocat, 1973

Extinct genus of rodents

Myophiomys is an extinct species of rodent from Africa.

== Sources ==
- Lavocat, R. 1973. Les rongeurs du Miocčne d’Afrique Orientale. Memoires et travaux Ecole Pratique des Hautes Etudes, Institut Montpellier, 1:1-284.
