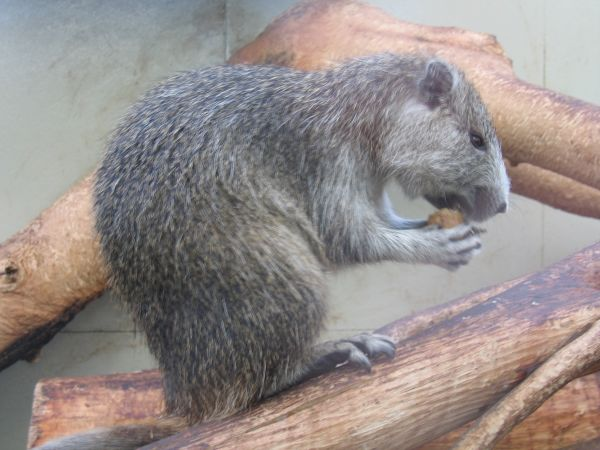
- Desmarest's hutia (Capromys pilorides)

Scientific classification
- Kingdom: Animalia
- Phylum: Chordata
- Class: Mammalia
- Infraclass: Placentalia
- Order: Rodentia
- Suborder: Hystricomorpha
- Infraorder: Hystricognathi; Tullberg, 1899

Families
- Abrocomidae; Bathyergidae †Bathyergoididae; Caviidae †Cephalomyidae; Chinchillidae; Ctenomyidae; Cuniculidae; Dasyproctidae †Diamantomyidae; Dinomyidae; Echimyidae †Eocardiidae; Erethizontidae †Heptaxodontidae; Heterocephalidae; Hystricidae †Kenyamyidae †Myophiomyidae †Neoepiblemidae; Octodontidae; Petromuridae †Phiomyidae; Thryonomyidae

Synonyms
- Eucaviomorpha

= Hystricognathi =

Hystricognathi Temporal range: Late Eocene–Recent

Infraorder of rodents

The Hystricognathi are an infraorder of rodents, distinguished from other rodents by the bone structure of their skulls. The masseter medialis (a jaw muscle) passes partially through a hole below each eye socket (called the infraorbital foramen) and connects to the bone on the opposite side. This, together with their lack of an infraorbital plate and the relative size of the infraorbital foramen, distinguishes hystricognaths from other rodent groups. The infraorder's name comes from Ancient Greek ὕστριξ (hústrix), meaning "porcupine", and γνάθος (gnáthos), meaning "jaw".

The 18 families within the Hystricognathi are divided into two parvorders, the Phiomorpha and the Caviomorpha. The Caviomorpha are mostly native to South America, with a few species in the Caribbean and North America, while the Phiomorpha occur in the Old World.

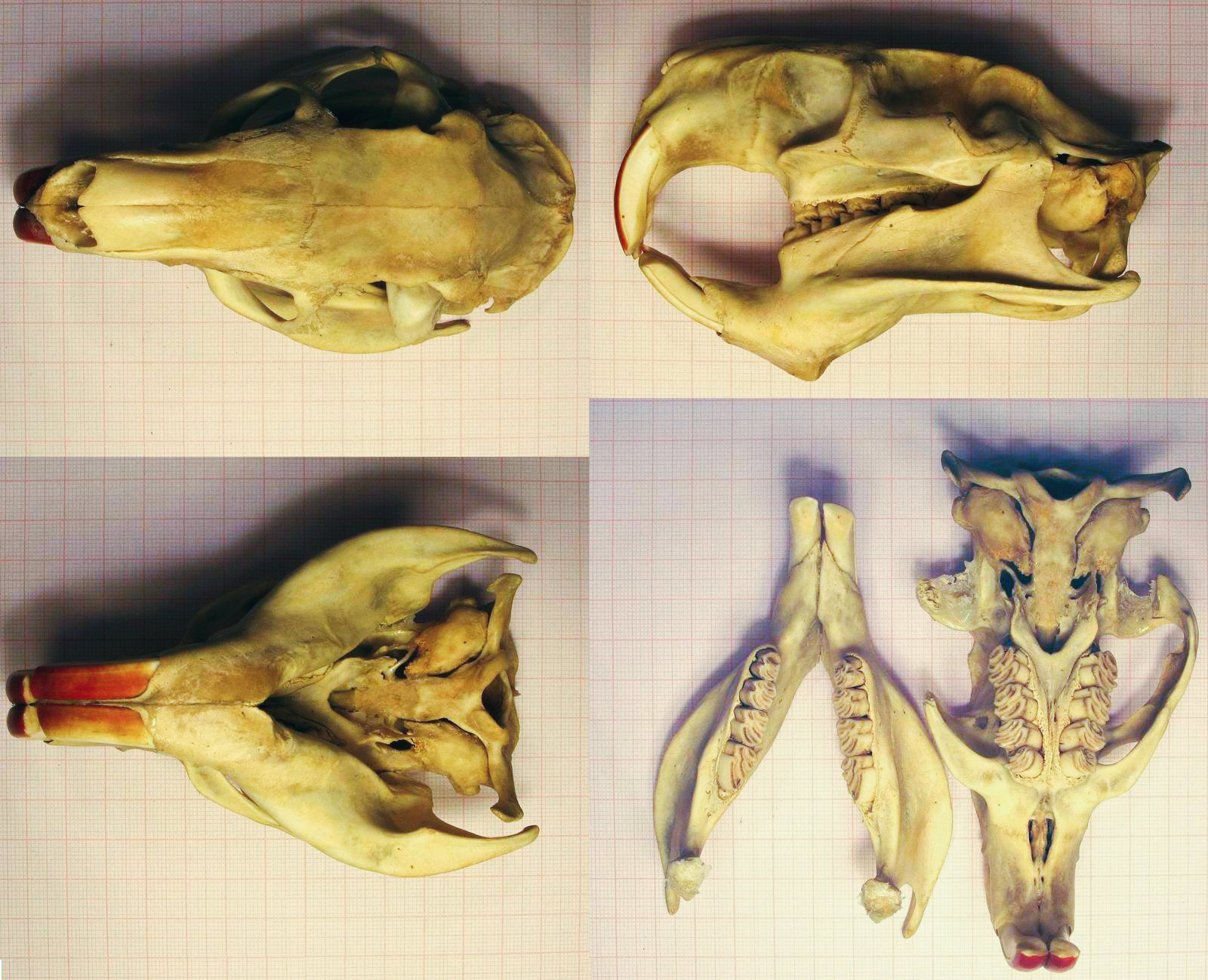
Skull of a nutria demonstrating the hystricognathous lower jaw and hystricomorphous zygomasseteric system

== Behavior ==
Play behavior has been observed in seven hystricognath families. The caviomorphs chase each other, play-wrestle, and gallop. The longer-legged species chase more often than the shorter-legged species. They also rotate their heads and body muscles as a form of play.

== Hystricognath families ==
- Hystricidae (Old World porcupines)

=== Phiomorphan hystricognath families ===
- Bathyergidae (African mole rats)
- Heterocephalidae (naked mole rats, monotypic taxon)
- Petromuridae (dassie rat, monotypic taxon)
- Thryonomyidae (cane rats)

=== Caviomorphan hystricognath families ===
- Abrocomidae (chinchilla rats)
- Caviidae (guinea pigs, wild cavies, and capybaras)
- Chinchillidae (chinchillas and viscachas)
- Ctenomyidae (tuco-tucos)
- Cuniculidae (pacas)
- Dasyproctidae (agoutis and acouchis)
- Dinomyidae (pacaranas and their fossil relatives, including some of megafaunal size)
- Echimyidae (spiny rats, hutias, and coypu)
- Erethizontidae (New World porcupines)
- Octodontidae (13 species including the degus)

== See also ==
- Sciurognathi
- Hystricomorpha
