= Phiomyoides =

Phiomyoides Temporal range: Early Miocene

Scientific classification
- Domain: Eukaryota
- Kingdom: Animalia
- Phylum: Chordata
- Class: Mammalia
- Order: Rodentia
- Family: †Myophiomyidae
- Subfamily: †Myophiomyinae
- Genus: †Phiomyoides; Stromer, 1926

Extinct genus of rodents

Phiomyoides is an extinct species of rodent known from Miocene fossils found in Africa.
