= Myophiomyinae =

Myophiomyinae Temporal range: Early - Middle Miocene

Scientific classification
- Domain: Eukaryota
- Kingdom: Animalia
- Phylum: Chordata
- Class: Mammalia
- Order: Rodentia
- Family: †Myophiomyidae
- Subfamily: †Myophiomyinae; Lavocat, 1973

Genera
- †Elmerimys †Myophiomys †Phiomyoides

Subfamily of rodent

Myophiomyinae is an extinct subfamily of rodent, of the family Myophiomyidae.
