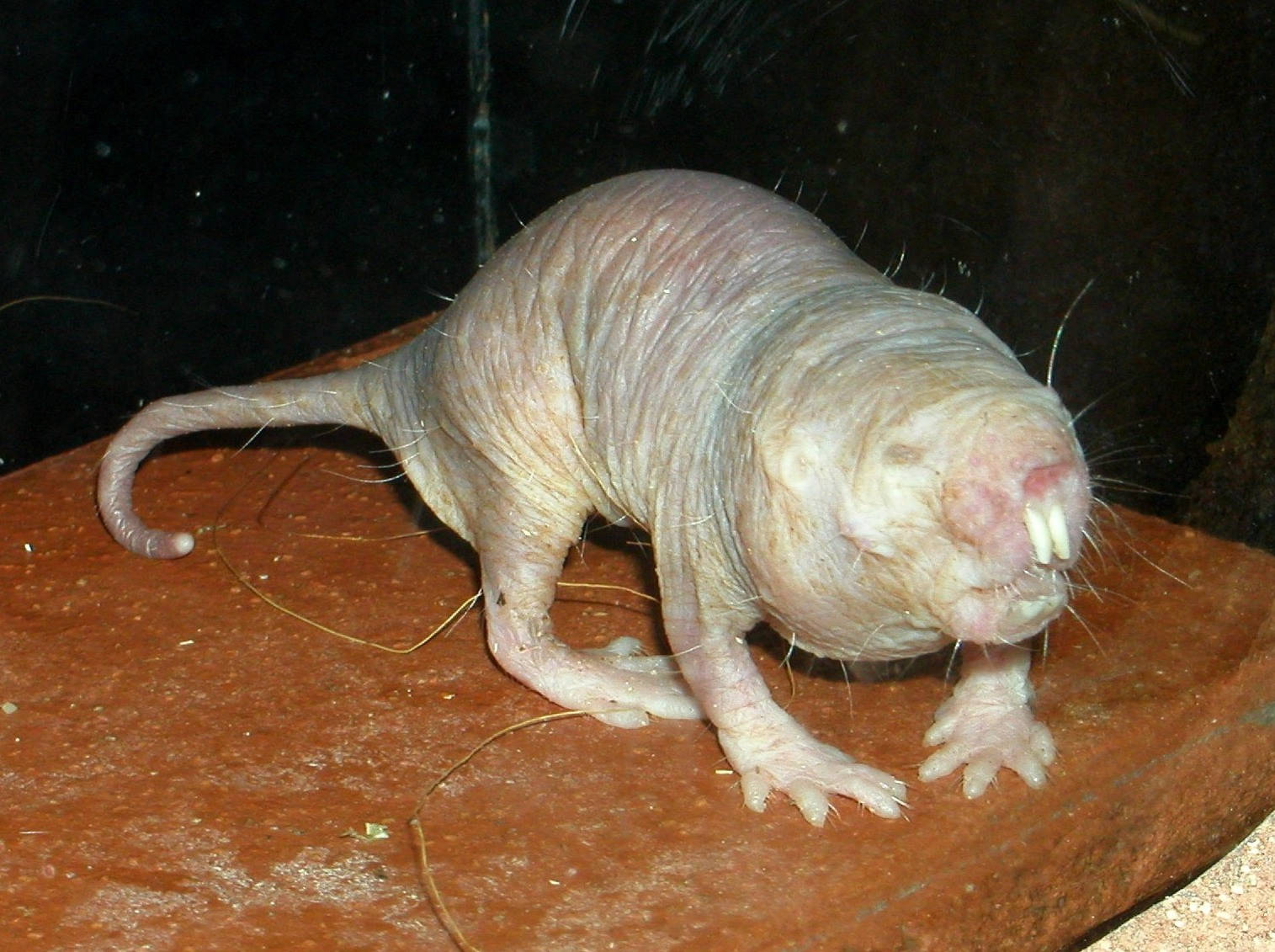
- Naked mole-rat

Scientific classification
- Kingdom: Animalia
- Phylum: Chordata
- Class: Mammalia
- Order: Rodentia
- Infraorder: Hystricognathi
- Parvorder: Phiomorpha; Lavocat, 1962

Families
- Bathyergidae; †Bathyergoididae; †Diamantomyidae; Heterocephalidae; †Kenyamyidae; †Myophiomyidae; Petromuridae; †Phiomyidae; Thryonomyidae

= Phiomorpha =

Phiomorphs Temporal range: Oligocene - Recent

Group of rodents

The rodent parvorder or infraorder Phiomorpha comprises several living and extinct families found wholly or largely in Africa. Along with Anomaluromorpha and perhaps the extinct Zegdoumyidae, it represents one of the few early colonizations of Africa by rodents.

== Diversification ==
During the Oligocene, Africa was not connected to any of the other continents. The predominant theory suggests that rodents first evolved in Laurasia, and expanded outward from there. Although Europe, Asia, and North America were distinct landmasses during much of the Eocene and Oligocene, they experienced intermittent migration events across the shallow sea separating Europe and Asia, via an ice-free Greenland (Europe and North America), or across Beringia (North America and Asia). The southern continents were much more isolated, leading to the unique faunas of Australia, South America, and to a lesser degree Africa.

Although the hystricognath rodents may have evolved from an early entodacryan ancestor in Asia, they migrated to Africa soon after. Phiomorpha represents the clade that evolved as a result. Their success and diversification during the Oligocene is partially attributed to an early shift towards herbivory, allowing them to survive off lower-quality foods and increasing their resilience to resource instability. Therefore, despite a decline in global temperatures and transition of African forests into savannahs and grasslands, Phiomorpha withstood this change and diversified within the new environments. Although once more diverse and widespread, this infraorder is now restricted to the Old World porcupines, the cane rats, the dassie rat, the naked mole-rat, and the blesmols.

== Families ==
The makeup of this infraorder is controversial. At its core lie the extant families Thryonomyidae, Petromuridae, and Bathyergidae and their extinct relatives. The Old World porcupines (Hystricidae) are sometimes included in Phiomorpha, but many authorities consider them either basal to all hystricognaths or basal to all hystricognaths except the Laotian rock rat (family Diatomyidae). Hystricidae fossils from as old as the Miocene have been unearthed across the Old World. Still, despite their wide range, it is hypothesized that these porcupines have origins in Asia or India. More recent analysis supports them not belonging in Phiomorpha. Molecular results suggest that the Diatomyidae is a part of the Ctenodactylomorphi, but this is in contrast to morphological results which place the animal at a basal position to all hystricognaths.

- Parvorder Phiomorpha
  - Family †Diamantomyidae
  - Family †Kenyamyidae
  - Family †Myophiomyidae
  - Family Petromuridae - the dassie rat
  - Family †Phiomyidae
  - Family Thryonomyidae - cane rats and their extinct relatives
  - Nanorder Bathyergomorpha
    - †Paracryptomys - incertae sedis
    - Family Bathyergidae - blesmols
    - Family †Bathyergoididae
    - Family Heterocephalidae - naked mole-rats

== See also ==
- Caviomorpha
- Hystricidae
- Hystricomorpha
