= Birbalomys =

Birbalomys Temporal range: Early Eocene–Middle Eocene

Scientific classification
- Kingdom: Animalia
- Phylum: Chordata
- Class: Mammalia
- Order: Rodentia
- Suborder: Hystricomorpha
- Superfamily: Ctenodactyloidea
- Family: †Chapattimyidae
- Genus: †Birbalomys; Sahni & Khare, 1973

Species
- Birbalomys woodi (type); Birbalomys ijlsti; Birbalomys sondaari; Birbalomys vandermeuleni

Extinct genus of rodents

Birbalomys is an extinct genus of rodent from Asia.

The 30 cm (12 in)-long creature has been thought to have been a member of the extant gundi family, but reconstructions of its physical appearance are speculative. Birbalomys bear resemblance with the Ctenodactyloidea, Chapattimyidae, and Yuomyidae families.
