= Chapattimyidae =

Chapattimyidae Temporal range: Oligocene

Scientific classification
- Domain: Eukaryota
- Kingdom: Animalia
- Phylum: Chordata
- Class: Mammalia
- Order: Rodentia
- Suborder: Hystricomorpha
- Superfamily: Ctenodactyloidea
- Family: †Chapattimyidae; Hussain et al. 1978

Genera
- See text

Extinct family of rodents

Chapattimyidae is an extinct family of rodent from Asia. According to Fossilworks, it contains two subfamilies and six unplaced genera.

- Subfamily Baluchimyinae Flynn et al. 1986
  - Asterattus Flynn and Cheema 1994
  - Baluchimys Flynn et al. 1986
  - Lindsaya Flynn et al. 1986
  - Lophibaluchia Flynn et al. 1986
  - Wakkamys Flynn et al. 1986
  - Zindapiria Flynn and Cheema 1994
- Subfamily Chapattimyinae Averianov 1996
  - Khodzhentia Averianov 1996
  - Terrarboreus Shevyreva 1971
- Unplaced genera
  - Basalomys Hartenberger 1982
  - Birbalomys Sahni and Khare 1973
  - Chapattimys Hussain et al. 1978
  - Gumbatomys Hartenberger 1982
  - Kazygurtia Nessov 1987
  - Subathumys Gupta and Kumar 2015
