= Rayoso Formation =

Geological formation in the Neuquén Province of Argentina

- Stratigraphic range: Aptian-Albian, ~120–113 Ma
- Type: Geological formation
- Unit of: Huitrín-Rayoso Group
- Sub-units: Pichi Neuquén Member
- Underlies: Lohan Cura and Carrín Cura Formations
- Overlies: La Amarga and Huitrín Formations
- Thickness: up to 604 m (1,982 ft)

Lithology
- Primary: Sandstone

Location
- Coordinates: 38.4°S 69.9°W
- Approximate paleocoordinates: 40.1°S 37.5°W
- Region: Neuquén Province
- Country: Argentina
- Extent: Neuquén Basin
- Rayoso Formation (Argentina)

The Rayoso Formation is a geological formation in the Neuquén Province of Argentina whose strata date back to the Aptian-Albian stages of the Early Cretaceous. Dinosaur remains are among the fossils that have been recovered from the formation.

== Description ==
The formation has a maximum thickness of 604 metres (1,982 ft) and has one member, the Pichi Neuquén Member. The unit comprises sandstones deposited in a lacustrine environment.

== Fossil content ==
Indeterminate ceratosaurian remains located in Neuquén Province, Argentina.

Dinosaurs of the Rayoso Formation
Genus	Species	Presence	Notes	Images
Ceratosauria indet.	Indeterminate	Neuquén Province		
Lavocatisaurus	L. agrioensis	Neuquén Province	Specimens representing several individuals at one site, including two juveniles and an adult	
Rayososaurus	R. agrioensis	Neuquén Province	Two partial scapulae, most of the left femur, and the proximal half of the left fibula	

== See also ==
- List of dinosaur-bearing rock formations
