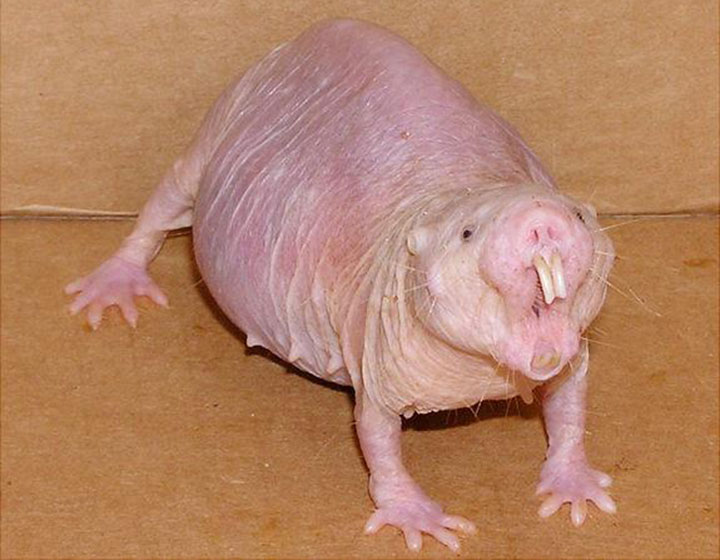

Conservation status
- Least Concern (IUCN 3.1)

Scientific classification
- Kingdom: Animalia
- Phylum: Chordata
- Class: Mammalia
- Order: Rodentia
- Suborder: Hystricomorpha
- Infraorder: Hystricognathi
- Parvorder: Phiomorpha
- Family: Heterocephalidae; Landry, 1957
- Genus: Heterocephalus; Rüppell, 1842
- Species: H. glaber

Binomial name
- Heterocephalus glaber Rüppell, 1842
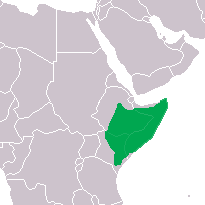
- Distribution of the naked mole-rat

= Naked mole-rat =

Naked mole-rat Temporal range: 4.3–0 Ma Early Pliocene - Recent

Burrowing eusocial rodent

Various aged naked mole-rats

The naked mole-rat (Heterocephalus glaber), also known as the sand puppy, is a burrowing rodent native to the Horn of Africa and parts of Kenya, notably in Somali regions. It is the only species in the genus Heterocephalus.

The naked mole-rat exhibits a highly unusual set of physiological and behavioural traits that allow it to thrive in a harsh underground environment, most notably its being the only mammalian thermoconformer with an almost entirely ectothermic (cold-blooded) form of body temperature regulation, as well as exhibiting eusociality, a complex social structure including a reproductive division of labour, separation of reproductive and non-reproductive castes, and cooperative care of young. The closely related Damaraland mole-rat (Fukomys damarensis) is the only other known eusocial mammal. Naked mole-rats lack pain sensitivity in their skin, and have very low metabolic and respiratory rates. The animal is also remarkable for its longevity and resistance to cancer and oxygen deprivation.

Although closely related to the blesmols, more recent investigation places it in a separate, exclusive family, Heterocephalidae, and no longer in the same family as other African mole-rats, Bathyergidae.

== Description ==
Typical naked mole-rat individuals are 8 to 10 cm (3 to 4 in) long and weigh 30 to 35 grams (1.1 to 1.2 oz). Breeding females are larger and may weigh well over 50 grams (1.8 oz), the largest reaching 80 grams (2.8 oz). They are well adapted to their underground existence. Their eyes are quite small, and their visual acuity is poor. Their legs are thin and short; however, they are highly adept at moving underground and can move backward as fast as they can move forward. Their large, protruding teeth are used to dig and their lips are sealed just behind the teeth, preventing soil from filling their mouths while digging. About a quarter of their musculature is used in the closing of their jaws while they dig. They have little hair (hence the common name) and wrinkled pink or yellowish skin. They lack an insulating layer in the skin.

== Physiology ==
=== Metabolism and respiration ===
The naked mole-rat is well adapted to the limited availability of oxygen within the tunnels of its typical habitat. It has underdeveloped lungs and its hemoglobin has a high affinity for oxygen, increasing the efficiency of oxygen uptake. It has a very low respiration and metabolic rate for an animal of its size, about 70% that of a mouse, thus using oxygen minimally. In response to long periods of hunger, its metabolic rate can be reduced by up to 25 percent.

The naked mole-rat survives for at least five hours in air that contains only 5% oxygen; it does not show any significant signs of distress and continues normal activity. It can live in an atmosphere of 80% CO_{2} and 20% oxygen. In zero-oxygen atmosphere, it can survive 18 minutes apparently without suffering any harm (but none survived a test of 30 minutes). During the anoxic period it loses consciousness, its heart rate drops from about 200 to 50 beats per minute, and breathing stops apart from sporadic breathing attempts. When deprived of oxygen, the animal uses fructose in its anaerobic glycolysis, producing lactic acid. This pathway is not inhibited by acidosis as happens with glycolysis of glucose. As of 2017, it was not known how the naked mole-rat survives acidosis without tissue damage. Naked mole-rats choose hypoxic environments over normoxic air when given a choice, behaviour not commonly observed among mammals.

=== Thermoregulation ===
The naked mole-rat does not regulate its body temperature in typical mammalian fashion. They are thermoconformers rather than thermoregulators in that, unlike other mammals, body temperature tracks ambient temperatures. The relationship between oxygen consumption and ambient temperature switches from a typical poikilothermic pattern to a homeothermic mode when temperature is at 29 °C (84 °F) or higher. At lower temperatures, naked mole-rats can use behavioural thermoregulation. For example, cold naked mole-rats huddle together or seek shallow parts of the burrows that are warmed by the sun. Conversely, when they get too hot, naked mole-rats retreat to the deeper, cooler parts of the burrows.

=== Pain insensitivity ===
The skin of naked mole-rats lacks neurotransmitters in their cutaneous sensory fibres. As a result, the naked mole-rats feel no pain when they are exposed to acid or capsaicin. When they are injected with substance P, a type of neurotransmitter, the pain signaling works as it does in other mammals but only with capsaicin and not with acids. This is proposed to be an adaptation to the animal living in high levels of carbon dioxide due to poorly ventilated living spaces which would cause acid to build up in their body tissues.

Naked mole-rats' substance P deficiency has also been tied to their lack of the histamine-induced itching and scratching behaviour typical of rodents.

=== Resistance to cancer ===
Naked mole-rats have a high resistance to tumours, although it is likely that they are not entirely immune to related disorders. A potential mechanism that averts cancer is an "over-crowding" gene, p16, which prevents cell division once individual cells come into contact (known as "contact inhibition"). The cells of most mammals, including naked mole-rats, undergo contact inhibition via p27, a gene which prevents cellular reproduction at a much higher cell density than p16 does. The combination of p16 and p27 in naked mole-rat cells is a double barrier to uncontrolled cell proliferation, one of the hallmarks of cancer.

In 2013, scientists reported that the reason naked mole-rats seem to be able to avoid cancer can be attributed to an "extremely high-molecular-mass hyaluronan" (HMW-HA) (a natural sugary substance), which is over "five times larger" than that in cancer-prone humans and cancer-susceptible laboratory animals. The scientific report was published a month later as the cover story of the journal Nature. A few months later, the same University of Rochester research team announced that naked mole-rats have ribosomes that produce extremely error-free proteins. Because of both of these discoveries, the journal Science named the naked mole-rat "Vertebrate of the Year" for 2013.

In 2016, a report was published that recorded the first ever discovered malignancies in two naked mole-rats. However, both animals were captive-born at zoos, and hence lived in an environment with 21% atmospheric oxygen compared to their natural 2–9%, which may have promoted tumourigenesis.

The Golan Heights blind mole-rat (Spalax golani) and the Judean Mountains blind mole-rat (Spalax judaei) are also resistant to cancer, but by a different mechanism.

In July 2023, a study reported the transference of the gene responsible for HMW-HA from a naked mole rat to mice leading to improved health and an approximate 4.4 percent increase in median lifespan for the mice.

=== Longevity ===
Naked mole-rats can live longer than any other rodent, with lifespans in excess of 37 years; the next longest-lived rodent is the African porcupine at 28 years. The mortality rate of the species does not increase with age, and thus does not conform to that of most mammals (as frequently defined by the Gompertz-Makeham law of mortality). Naked mole-rats are highly resistant to cancer, and maintain healthy vascular function longer in their lifespan than shorter-living rats. Queens age more slowly than nonbreeders.

The mechanisms underlying naked mole-rat longevity are debated, but are thought to be related to their ability to substantially reduce their metabolism in response to adverse conditions, and so prevent aging-induced damage from oxidative stress. This has been referred to as "living their life in pulses". Their longevity has also been attributed to "protein stability". Because of their extraordinary longevity, an international effort was put into place to sequence the genome of the naked mole-rat. A draft genome was made available in 2011 with an improved version released in 2014. Its somatic number is 2n = 60. Further transcriptome sequencing revealed that genes related to mitochondria and oxidation reduction are expressed more than they are in mice, which may contribute to their longevity.

The DNA repair transcriptomes of the liver of humans, naked mole-rats, and mice were compared. The maximum lifespans of humans, naked mole-rats, and mice are respectively c. 120, 30 and 3 years. The longer-lived species, humans and naked mole-rats, expressed DNA repair genes, including core genes in several DNA repair pathways, at a higher level than did mice. In addition, several DNA repair pathways in humans and naked mole-rats were up-regulated compared with mice. These findings suggest that increased DNA repair facilitates greater longevity, and also are consistent with the DNA damage theory of aging.

=== Size ===
Reproducing females become the dominant female, usually by founding new colonies, fighting for the dominant position, or taking over once the reproducing female dies. These reproducing females tend to have longer bodies than that of their non-reproducing counterparts of the same skull width. The measurements of females before and after they became reproductive show significant increases in body size. It is believed that this trait does not occur due to pre-existing morphological differences but to the actual attainment of the dominant female position. As with the reproductive females, the reproductive males also appear to be larger than their non-reproducing counterparts but the difference is smaller than in females. These males also have visible outlines of the testes through the skin of their abdomens. Unlike the females, there are usually multiple reproducing males.

=== Chronobiology ===
The naked mole-rat's subterranean habitat imposes constraints on its circadian rhythm. Living in constant darkness, most individuals possess a free-running activity pattern and are active both day and night, sleeping for short periods several times in between. However, colonies do not exhibit synchrony in circadian sleep-wake cycles.

== Ecology and behaviour ==
=== Distribution and habitat ===
The naked mole-rat is native to the drier parts of the tropical grasslands of East Africa, predominantly southern Ethiopia, Kenya, and Somalia.

=== Roles ===
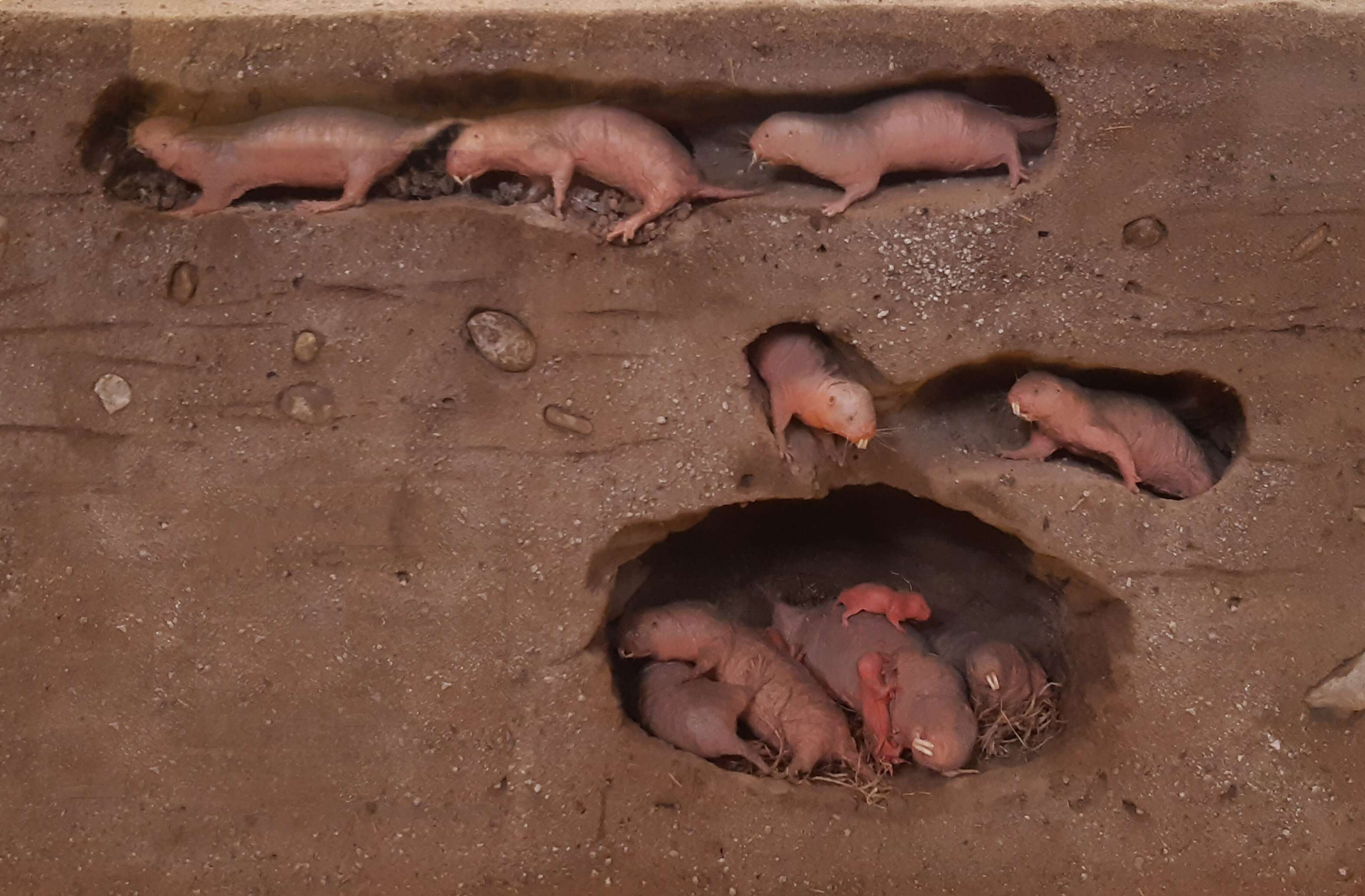
Model of naked mole-rat soldiers, workers, and queen, a social structure similar to the castes of the eusocial insects

The naked mole-rat was the first mammal found to be eusocial. The Damaraland mole-rat (Fukomys damarensis) is the only other eusocial mammal currently known.

The social structure of naked mole-rats is similar to that of ants, termites, and some bees and wasps. Only one female (the queen) and one to three males reproduce, while the rest of the members of the colony function as workers. The queen and breeding males are able to breed at one year of age. Workers are sociologically but not physiologically sterile. Smaller workers focus on gathering food and maintaining the nest, while larger workers are the tunnelers, and are the most reactive to threats. The non-reproducing females appear to be reproductively suppressed, meaning the ovaries do not fully mature, and do not have the same levels of certain hormones as the reproducing females. By contrast, there is little difference of hormone concentration between reproducing and non-reproducing males. In experiments where the reproductive female was removed or died, one of the non-reproducing females would take over and become sexually active. Non-reproducing members of the colony cooperate to care for the pups produced by the queen (usually their mother or sister). Workers keep the pups from straying out of the nest, groom the pups, and snuggle to keep them warm, extend tunnels in search of food, bring food to the nest, and defend pups from attacks by predators and foreign colonies.

==== Queen and gestation ====
The relationships between the queen and the breeding males may last for many years; other females are temporarily sterile. Queens live from 13 to 18 years, and are extremely hostile to other females that attempt to exert physical dominance, or that produce hormones associated with becoming queens. When the queen dies, another female takes her place, often after a violent struggle with her competitors. Once established, the new queen's body expands the space between the vertebrae in her backbone to become longer and ready to bear pups.

In the wild, naked mole-rats usually breed once a year, if the litter survives. In captivity, they breed all year long and can produce a litter every 80 days. Gestation lasts about 70 days. Litter size is typically 3 to 12 pups; the average litter size is 11–12. The young are born blind and weigh about 2 grams (0.07 oz). The queen nurses them for the first month, after which the other members of the colony feed them faecal pap until they are old enough to eat solid food.

In most female mammals the number of mammae is about double the average litter size. Presumably this enables females to successfully nurse litters even if some mammae fail to produce milk. Naked mole-rats break this "one-half rule"; field caught and lab born litters averaged 11 to 12 pups, and numbers of mammae on both wild and captive females were similarly 11 to 12. Maximum litter sizes were 28 in the field and 27 in captivity, whereas the maximum number of mammae was 15. Breeding female naked mole-rats can bear and successfully rear litters that are far more numerous than their mammae because young take turns nursing from the same mammary, and breeding females and pups are fed and protected by colony mates, enabling queens to concentrate their reproductive efforts on gestation and lactation.

==== Workers ====
The queen is the most active member of a colony, and she induces workers to increase their activities by repeatedly shoving them. Smaller workers focus on acquiring food and maintaining tunnels, while the larger workers react strongly to disturbances. As in honey bees, the workers are divided along a continuum of different worker-caste behaviour instead of being in discrete groups. Larger workers function primarily as tunnellers, expanding the large network of tunnels within the burrow system, ejecting earth excavated during tunneling onto the ground surface, and as soldiers, protecting the group from outside predators. Smaller workers perform colony maintenance tasks such as foraging, nest building, and pup care. Workers that find new food sources (tubers) in their vast subterranean burrow systems give a special call on their way back to the nest and wave the food around once they get there. Recruits find the new site by following an odour trail left by the initial scout, behaviour somewhat analogous to trail deposition and following by ants and termites.

==== Dispersers ====
Inbreeding is common among naked mole-rats within a colony. This results in colony members being extremely closely related, which in turn favours nepotism among non-breeders toward siblings. However, prolonged inbreeding is usually associated with lower fitness. The discovery of male and female dispersers has revealed that there is a mechanism of inter-colony outbreeding. Dispersers are morphologically, physiologically and behaviourally distinct from colony members and actively seek to leave their burrow when an escape opportunity presents itself. These individuals are equipped with generous fat reserves for their journey. Though they possess high levels of luteinising hormone, dispersers are only interested in mating with individuals from foreign colonies rather than their own colony's queen. They also show little interest in working cooperatively with colony members in their natal burrow. Hence, disperser morphs are well-prepared to promote the establishment of new, initially outbred colonies, before cycles of inbreeding resume.

==== Colonies ====
Colonies average 75-80 individuals, but may contain more than 300, and their tunnel systems can stretch 3 to 5 kilometres (1.9 to 3.1 mi) in cumulative length.

Laboratory colonies are xenophobic, and will attack and kill invaders from different colonies. Likewise, wild colonies sometimes expand their territories by invading neighboring colonies. Invaders may kidnap small pups and incorporate them into their own colony's workforce, an intriguing convergence with the behaviour of slave-making ants.

=== Female mate choice ===
In lab experiments, reproductively active female naked mole rats tended to associate with unfamiliar males (usually non-kin) when given a choice, whereas reproductively inactive females did not discriminate. The preference of queens for unfamiliar males likely is an adaptation to reduce inbreeding; however, within established colonies queens rarely have opportunities to express such preferences. Evolutionarily, outbreeding may be preferred because it reduces the likelihood of expressing deleterious recessive alleles, whereas inbreeding results in closer genetic relationships among naked mole-rat families, favouring self-sacrificial and nepotistic behaviour.

=== Diet ===
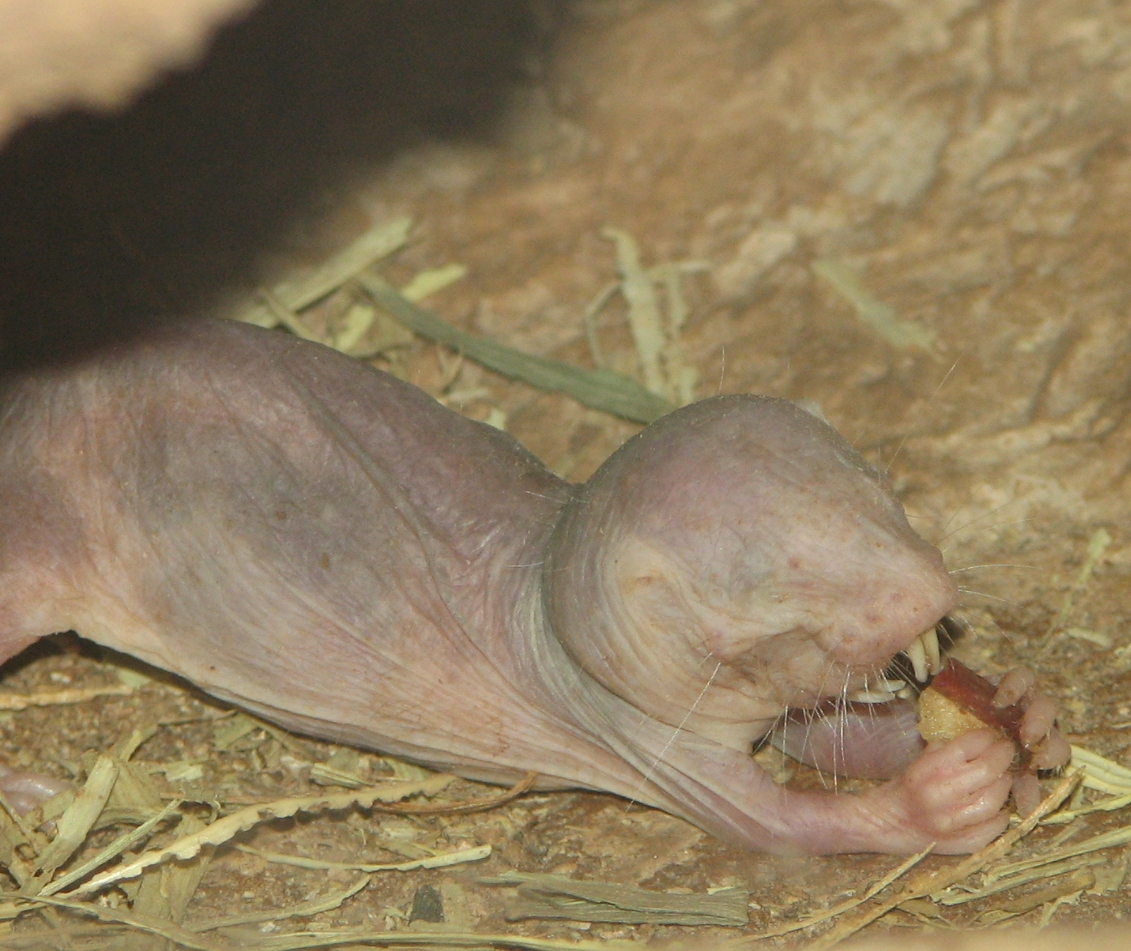
A captive naked mole-rat eating

Naked mole-rats feed primarily on very large tubers (weighing as much as a thousand times the body weight of a typical mole-rat) that they find deep underground through their mining operations. A single tuber can provide a colony with a long-term source of food, lasting for months, or even years, as they eat the inside but leave the outside, allowing the tuber to regenerate. Symbiotic bacteria in the mole-rats' intestines ferment the fibres, allowing otherwise indigestible cellulose to be turned into volatile fatty acids.

Naked mole-rats sometimes also eat their own faeces. This behaviour not only nourishes pups post-weaning but also is part of their eusocial behaviour, a mechanism of sharing and assessing hormones from the queen.

=== Predators ===
Naked mole rats are primarily preyed upon by snakes, especially the rufous beaked snake and Kenyan sand boa, as well as honey badgers and various raptors. They are at their most vulnerable when ejecting soil to the surface ("volcanoing").

== Conservation status ==
Naked mole-rats are not threatened. They are widespread and numerous, but, being subterranean, they are essentially unnoticeable in the drier regions of East Africa (except for their small "volcanoes" of ejected earth).
