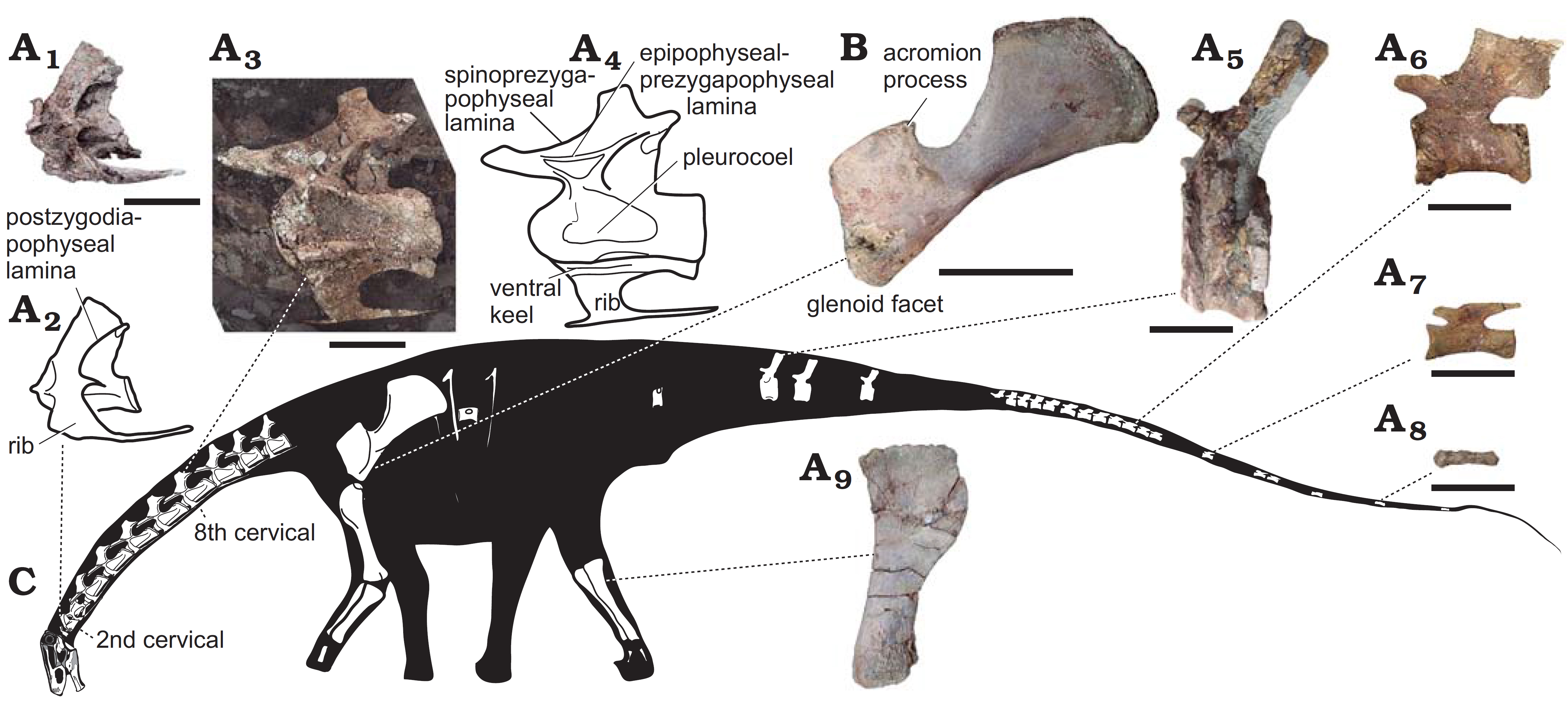
- Fossil bones and skeletal diagram showing known elements

Scientific classification
- Domain: Eukaryota
- Kingdom: Animalia
- Phylum: Chordata
- Clade: Dinosauria
- Clade: Saurischia
- Clade: †Sauropodomorpha
- Clade: †Sauropoda
- Superfamily: †Diplodocoidea
- Family: †Rebbachisauridae
- Genus: †Lavocatisaurus; Canudo et al. 2018

Type species
- †Lavocatisaurus agrioensis Canudo et al. 2018

= Lavocatisaurus =

Lavocatisaurus Temporal range: Aptian–Albian

Dinosaur genus

Lavocatisaurus (meaning "René Lavocat's lizard") is a genus of sauropod in the family Rebbachisauridae from the Early Cretaceous (Aptian to Albian) Rayoso Formation of the Neuquén Basin, northern Patagonia, Argentina.

== Discovery and naming ==
In 2009, a group of Spanish–Argentinean palaeontologists attempted to locate the site from which the holotype of the rebbachisaurid Rayososaurus agrioensis was discovered. While investigating strata belonging to the Pichi Neuquén Member of the Rayoso Formation, the remains of a different rebbachisaurid taxon, consisting of two juveniles and an adult, were uncovered. The specimens were excavated over the next two years, and once completed, the material was divided between the Museo Provincial de Ciencias Naturales and the Museo Paleontológico Egidio Feruglio for preparation. In 2018, the new taxon, Lavocatisaurus agrioensis, was described, with the adult (MOZ-Pv1232) designated as the holotype. The generic name refers to the French palaeontologist René Lavocat, while the specific name refers to Agrio del Medio, the locality from which the specimens were recovered.

== Description ==
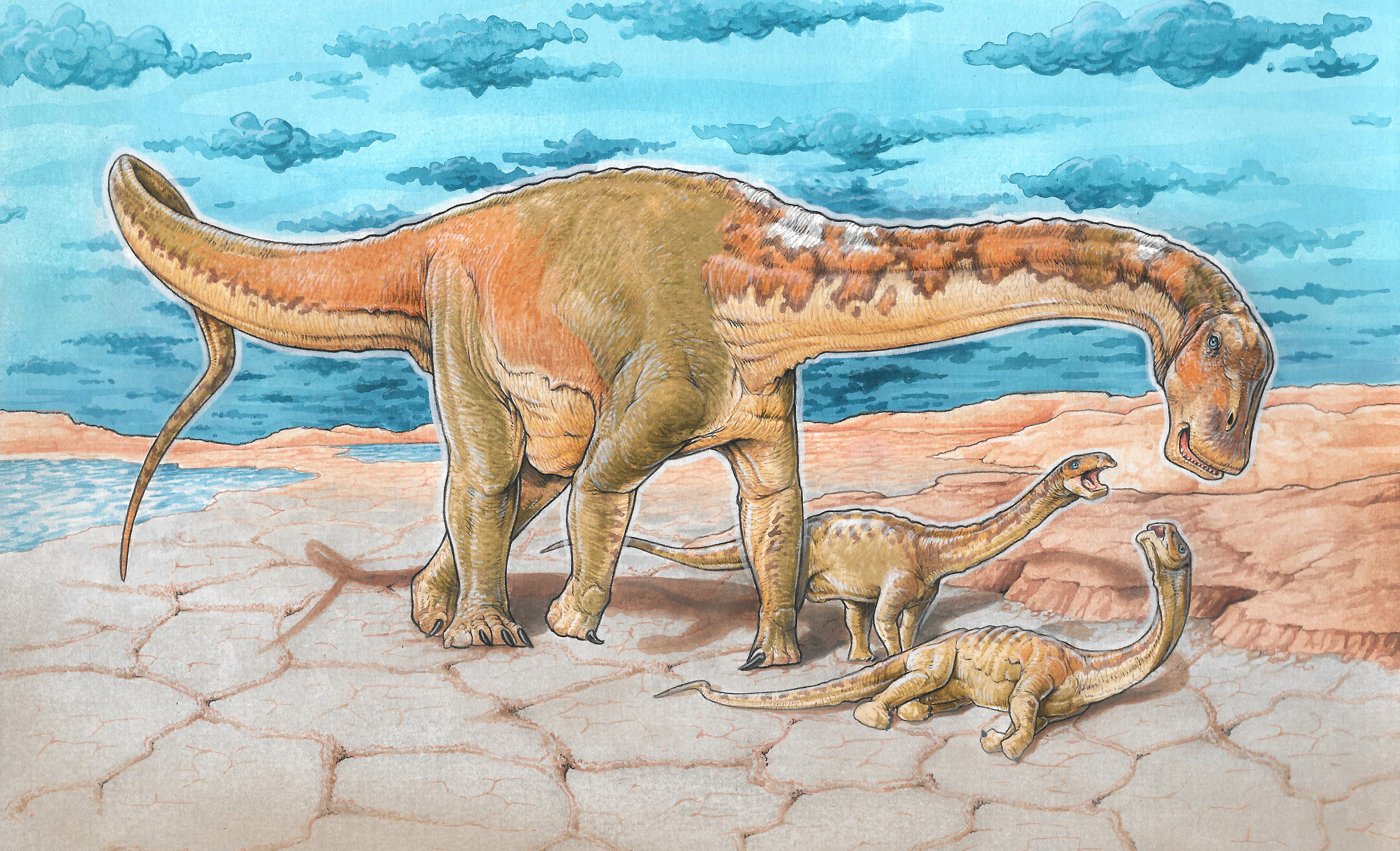
Life restorations of known individuals

Lavocatisaurus was a medium-sized sauropod, and one of the only known dinosaurs from the Rayoso Formation. It is known from almost all of its anatomical elements, and it is known from a few specimens including juveniles and an adult. The adult specimen is currently under preparation, and thus the described fossils come from a number of juvenile individuals. The skull was elongate and similar in shape to that of Diplodocus. The skull is well preserved for the most part, and it provides further evidence that some sauropods may have had a beak-like keratinous sheath covering the anterior of the snout.

== Classification ==
In their phylogenetic analysis Canudo et al. (2018) found Lavocatisaurus to be a basal rebbachisaurid. They resolved it in a derived position relative to other basal rebbachisaurids, as the sister group to the Khebbashia, the clade formed by Rebbachisaurinae and Limaysaurinae.
