= Kenyamyidae =

Kenyamyidae Temporal range: Early Miocene

Scientific classification
- Domain: Eukaryota
- Kingdom: Animalia
- Phylum: Chordata
- Class: Mammalia
- Order: Rodentia
- Parvorder: Phiomorpha
- Family: †Kenyamyidae; Lavocat, 1973

Genera
- †Kenyamys †Simonimys

Extinct family of rodents

Kenyamyidae is an extinct family of rodents from Africa that lived in the Lower Miocene era.

There are two genera in the family, Kenyamys and Simonymys, both described by Lavocat in 1973. There are two species of Kenyamys, K. mariae and K. williamsi. There is only one species of Simonymys, S. genovefae.
