= Diamantomyidae =

Diamantomyidae Temporal range: Late Eocene–Middle Miocene

Scientific classification
- Kingdom: Animalia
- Phylum: Chordata
- Class: Mammalia
- Order: Rodentia
- Parvorder: Phiomorpha
- Family: †Diamantomyidae; Schaub, 1958

Subfamilies
- †Metaphiomyinae †Diamantomyinae †Pomonomys

Extinct family of rodents

Diamantomyidae is a family of extinct hystricognath rodents from Africa and Asia.
