= Bathyergoides =

Bathyergoides Temporal range: Early Miocene ~21 Ma

Scientific classification
- Domain: Eukaryota
- Kingdom: Animalia
- Phylum: Chordata
- Class: Mammalia
- Order: Rodentia
- Parvorder: Phiomorpha
- Family: †Bathyergoididae; Lavocat, 1973
- Genus: †Bathyergoides; Stromer 1926

Species
- B. neotertiarius (type)

Extinct genus of rodents

Bathyergoides is an extinct genus of rodent from Africa thought to be related to the modern blesmols. It is the only member of the family Bathyergoididae. Fossils of Bathyergoides neotertiarius were recovered from the Early Miocene Elisabeth Bay Formation of Namibia.
