= Myophiomyidae =

Myophiomyidae Temporal range: Early Oligocene–Middle Miocene

Scientific classification
- Kingdom: Animalia
- Phylum: Chordata
- Class: Mammalia
- Order: Rodentia
- Suborder: Hystricomorpha
- Infraorder: Hystricognathi
- Parvorder: Phiomorpha
- Family: †Myophiomyidae; Lavocat, 1973

Subfamilies
- †Myophiomyinae †Phiocricetomyinae

Extinct family of rodents

Myophiomyidae is an extinct family of Old World hystricognaths.
