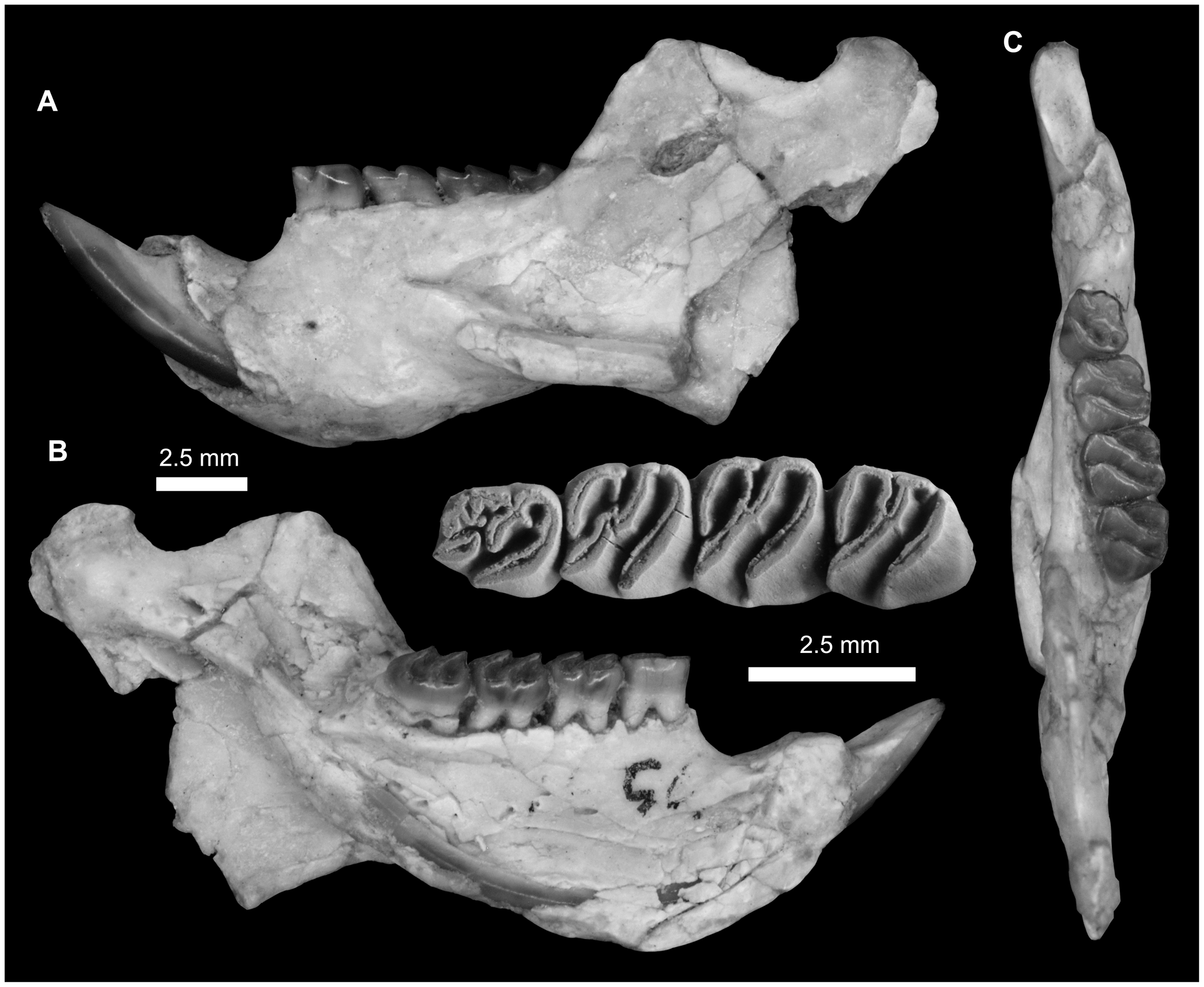
- Gaudeamus hylaeus mandible

Scientific classification
- Kingdom: Animalia
- Phylum: Chordata
- Class: Mammalia
- Order: Rodentia
- Parvorder: Phiomorpha
- Family: †Phiomyidae; Wood, 1955

= Phiomyidae =

Phiomyidae Temporal range: Late Eocene–Middle Miocene

Extinct family of rodents

The Phiomyidae are a family of prehistoric rodents from Africa and Eurasia. A 2011 study placed Gaudeamus in a new family, Gaudeamuridae.

Genera include:

- Acritophiomys
- Andrewsimys
- Elwynomys
- Gaudeamus
- Phiomys
