= René Lavocat =

French paleontologist (1909-2007)

- Born: 24 August 1909
- Died: 9 August 2007 (aged 97); Teyran, near Montpellier
- Known for: Paleontology
- Scientific career
- Author abbrev. (zoology): Lavocat

René Lavocat (24 August 1909 – 9 August 2007) was a French palaeontologist who described several genera of African dinosaurs including the sauropod Rebbachisaurus, as well as several extinct mammals such as the family Kenyamyidae. The mammal Lavocatia, the notosuchian Lavocatchampsa, the sauropod Lavocatisaurus and the phorusrhacid Lavocatavis are named after him.

== Paleontological discoveries ==
Eager to try palaeontological research in Africa to find Oligocene mammals, Lavocat was strongly endorsed by Camille Arambourg. In 1947, he obtained leadership of a research mission in the Algerian-Moroccan desert.

He did not find any Oligocene mammals, but instead came across a rich fauna of Cretaceous vertebrates. His first notes on this subject were made in 1948 entitled les Comptes Rendus Sommaires de la Société géologique de France (English: Report Summary to the Geological Society of France) in which Lavocat explains the discovery of a large number of Cretaceous reptiles (dinosaurs and crocodiles) and fish in the bedrock of the desert. A year later, a second note appeared in the same journal and extends his discoveries to the southwestern Kem Kem.

In 1948, Lavocat discovered an incomplete postcranial skeleton of a sauropod dinosaur at the Gara Sbaa locality, an outcrop of the middle Cretaceous-aged Kem Kem Beds, in Errachidia, Morocco. Following two more expeditions to that area, the skeleton was completely collected by 1952. Lavocat described it as belonging to a new genus and species, Rebbachisaurus garasbae, in 1954. In addition, in 1955 he described a new genus of theropod, Majungasaurus. In 1960, Lavocat returned to Africa and described a second species of Rebbachisaurus, R. tamesnensis. In 1973, Lavocat discovered two genera and three species of Miocene rodent, which he placed in the family Kenyamyidae.
