= Miocene =

First epoch of the Neogene Period

- 23.04 – 5.333 Ma
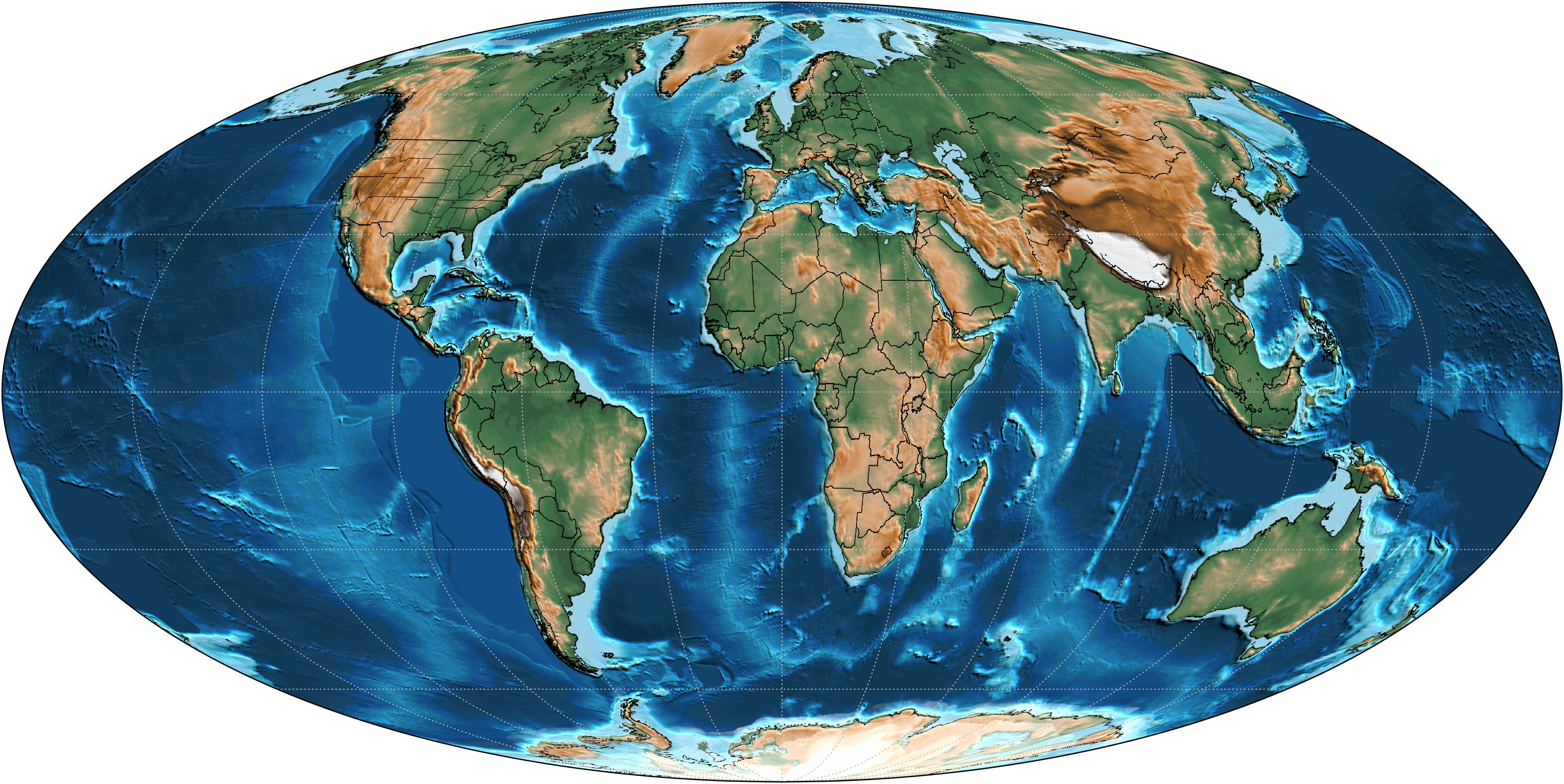
- A map of Earth as it appeared 15 million years ago during the Miocene Epoch, Langhian Age

Chronology
← / Messinian salinity crisis; ← / North American prairie expands
Subdivision of the Neogene according to the ICS, as of 2024. Vertical axis scale: Millions of years ago

Etymology
- Name formality: Formal

Usage information
- Celestial body: Earth
- Regional usage: Global (ICS)
- Time scale(s) used: ICS Time Scale

Definition
- Chronological unit: Epoch
- Stratigraphic unit: Series
- Time span formality: Formal
- Lower boundary definition: Base of magnetic polarity chronozone C6Cn.2n; FAD of the Planktonic foraminiferan Paragloborotalia kugleri
- Lower boundary GSSP: Lemme-Carrosio Section, Carrosio, Italy; 44.6589°N 8.8364°E
- Lower GSSP ratified: 1996
- Upper boundary definition: Base of the Thvera magnetic event (C3n.4n), which is only 96 ka (5 precession cycles) younger than the GSSP
- Upper boundary GSSP: Heraclea Minoa section, Heraclea Minoa, Cattolica Eraclea, Sicily, Italy; 37.3917°N 13.2806°E
- Upper GSSP ratified: 2000

The Miocene (/ˈmaɪ.əsiːn, -oʊ-/ MY-ə-seen, -oh-) is the first geological epoch of the Neogene Period and extends from approximately 23 to 5 million years ago (Ma). The Miocene was named by Scottish geologist Charles Lyell and comes from Ancient Greek μείων (meíōn), lit. 'less', and καινός (kainós), lit. 'new' or 'recent', and thus means "less recent", because it has 18% fewer modern marine invertebrates than the Pliocene has. The Miocene followed the Oligocene and preceded the Pliocene.

As Earth went from the Oligocene through the Miocene and into the Pliocene, the climate slowly cooled towards a series of ice ages. The Miocene boundaries are not marked by distinct global events but by regionally defined transitions from the warmer Oligocene to the cooler Pliocene Epoch.

During the Early Miocene, Afro-Arabia collided with Eurasia, severing the connection between the Mediterranean and Indian Oceans and enabling the interchange of fauna between the continents, including the dispersal of proboscideans and hominoids into Eurasia. During the late Miocene, the connections between the Atlantic and Mediterranean closed, causing the Mediterranean Sea to almost completely evaporate. This event is referred to as the "Messinian salinity crisis". Then, at the Miocene–Pliocene boundary, the Strait of Gibraltar opened, and the Mediterranean refilled. That event is referred to as the "Zanclean flood".

Also during the early Miocene (specifically the Aquitanian and Burdigalian Stages), the apes first evolved, began diversifying, and became widespread throughout the Old World. Around the end of this epoch, the ancestors of humans had split away from the ancestors of the chimpanzees and had begun following their own evolutionary path during the final Messinian Stage (7.5–5.3 Ma) of the Miocene. As in the Oligocene before it, grasslands continued to expand, and forests to dwindle. In the seas of the Miocene, kelp forests made their first appearance and soon became one of Earth's most productive ecosystems.

The plants and animals of the Miocene were recognizably modern. Mammals and birds were well established. Whales, pinnipeds, and kelp spread.

The Miocene is of particular interest to geologists and palaeoclimatologists because major phases of the geology of the Himalaya occurred during that epoch, affecting monsoonal patterns in Asia, which were interlinked with glacial periods in the northern hemisphere.

== Subdivisions ==
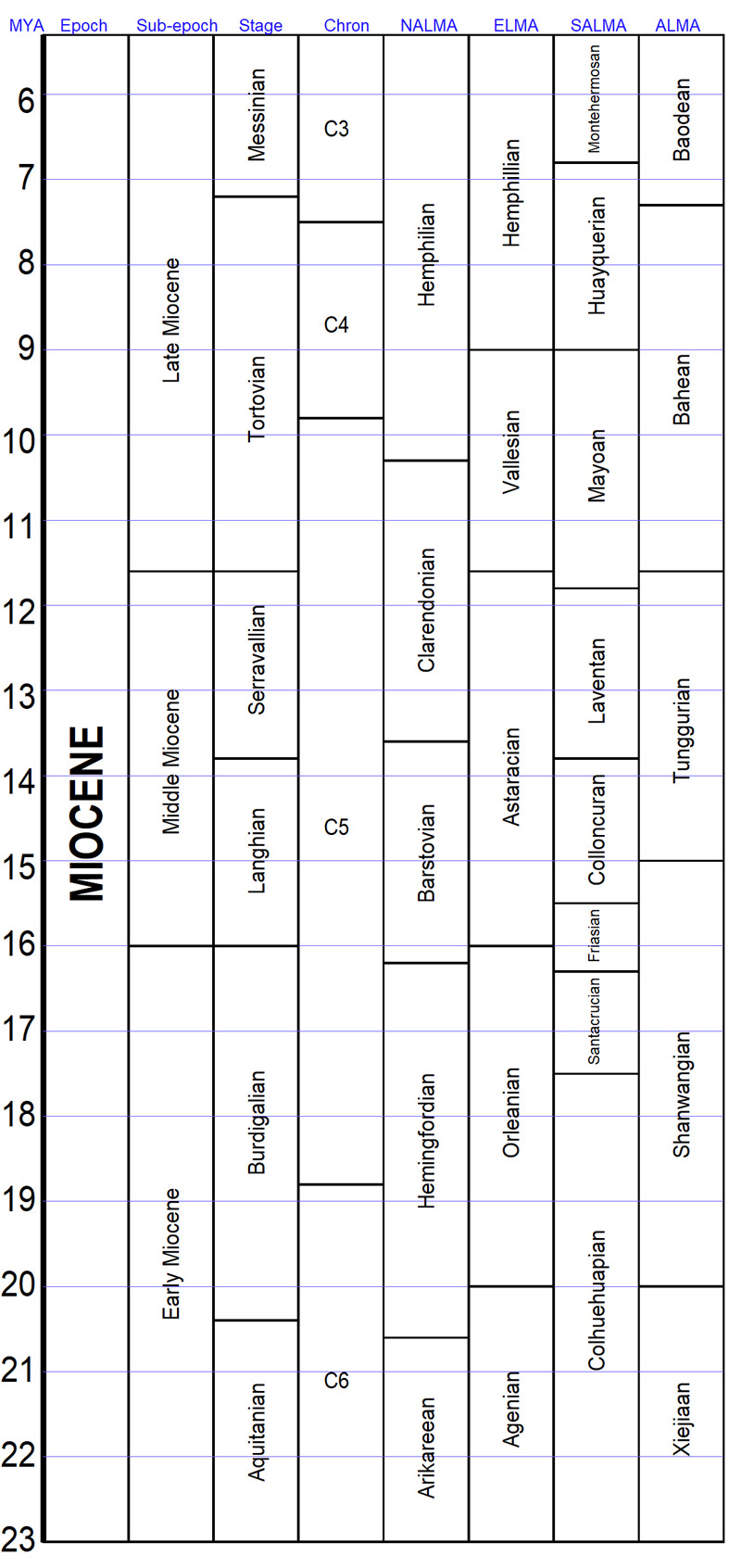
Subdivisions of the Miocene

The Miocene faunal stages from youngest to oldest are typically named according to the International Commission on Stratigraphy:

Sub-epoch	Faunal stage	Time range
Late Miocene	Messinian	7.246–5.333 Ma
Late Miocene	Tortonian	11.63–7.246 Ma
Middle Miocene	Serravallian	13.82–11.63 Ma
Middle Miocene	Langhian	15.97–13.82 Ma
Early Miocene	Burdigalian	20.44–15.97 Ma
Early Miocene	Aquitanian	23.03–20.44 Ma

=== Land mammal ages ===
Cenozoic mammal faunas are often described using biochronological or biostratigraphic systems, which arrange rock strata or intervals of time based on distinctive fossil assemblages or the evolution of new mammal species. Apart from Antarctica, each continent has a unique series of Cenozoic land mammal ages (LMAs) overprinted on the global geological time scale. These different land mammal ages are listed in the following table, which shows rough correlations to each other and the six global ages/stages of the Miocene:

Global age	NALMA (North America)	SALMA (South America)	ELMA / MN (Europe)	ALMA (Asia)	AFLMA (Africa)	(Australia)
Messinian	Hemphillian	Montehermosan	Turolian (MN 11-13)	Baodean	Baringian	Waitean
Messinian	Hemphillian	Huayquerian	Turolian (MN 11-13)	Baodean	Baringian	Waitean
Messinian	Hemphillian	Huayquerian	Turolian (MN 11-13)	Baodean	Sugutan	Waitean
Tortonian	Hemphillian	Huayquerian	Turolian (MN 11-13)	Bahean	Sugutan	Waitean
Tortonian	Clarendonian	Chasicoan	Vallesian (MN 9-10)	Bahean	Sugutan	Waitean
Tortonian	Clarendonian	Mayoan	Vallesian (MN 9-10)	Bahean	Tugenian	Waitean
Tortonian	Clarendonian	Mayoan	Astaracian (MN 6-8)	Tunggurian	Tugenian	Waitean
Serravallian	Clarendonian	Laventan	Astaracian (MN 6-8)	Tunggurian	Tugenian	Camfieldian
Serravallian	Barstovian	Laventan	Astaracian (MN 6-8)	Tunggurian	Tugenian	Camfieldian
Serravallian	Barstovian	Laventan	Astaracian (MN 6-8)	Tunggurian	Tinderetian	Camfieldian
Langhian	Barstovian	Colloncuran	Astaracian (MN 6-8)	Tunggurian	Tinderetian	Camfieldian
Langhian	Barstovian	Colloncuran	Orleanian (MN 3-5)	Tunggurian	Tinderetian	Camfieldian
Langhian	Barstovian	Friasian	Orleanian (MN 3-5)	Tunggurian	Tinderetian	Camfieldian
Burdigalian	Hemingfordian	Santacrucian	Orleanian (MN 3-5)	Shanwangian	Kisingirian	Camfieldian
Burdigalian	Hemingfordian	Santacrucian	Orleanian (MN 3-5)	Shanwangian	Kisingirian	Wipajirian
Burdigalian	Arikareean	Santacrucian	Orleanian (MN 3-5)	Shanwangian	Legetetian	Wipajirian
Burdigalian	Arikareean	Santacrucian	Orleanian (MN 3-5)	Xiejian	Legetetian	Wipajirian
Aquitanian	Arikareean	Colhuehuapian	Agenian (MN 1-2)	Xiejian	Legetetian	Wipajirian
Aquitanian	Arikareean	Colhuehuapian	Agenian (MN 1-2)	Xiejian	Turkwelian	Wipajirian

== Paleogeography ==
Japan during the Early Miocene

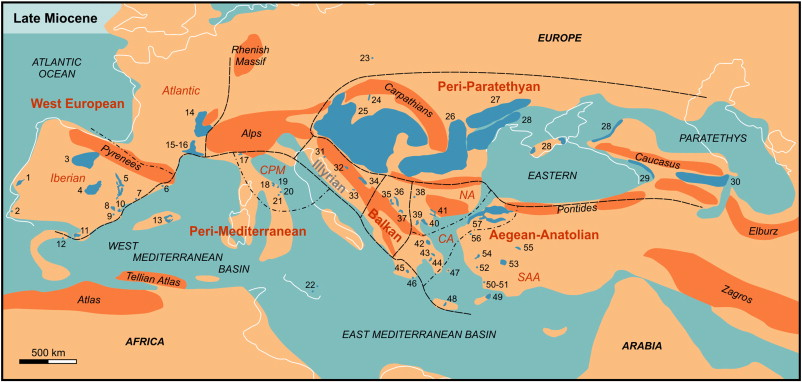
The Mediterranean during the Late Miocene

Continents continued to drift toward their present positions. Of the modern geologic features, only the land bridge between South America and North America was absent, although South America was approaching the western subduction zone in the Pacific Ocean, causing both the rise of the Andes and a southward extension of the Meso-American peninsula.

Mountain building took place in western North America, Europe, and East Asia. Both continental and marine Miocene deposits are common worldwide with marine outcrops common near modern shorelines. Well studied continental exposures occur in the North American Great Plains and in Argentina.

The global trend was towards increasing aridity caused primarily by global cooling reducing the ability of the atmosphere to absorb moisture, particularly after 7 to 8 million years ago. Uplift of East Africa in the late Miocene was partly responsible for the shrinking of tropical rain forests in that region, and Australia got drier as it entered a zone of low rainfall in the Late Miocene.

=== Eurasia ===
The Indian Plate continued to collide with the Eurasian Plate, creating new mountain ranges and uplifting the Tibetan Plateau, resulting in the rain shadowing and aridification of the Asian interior. The Tian Shan experienced significant uplift in the Late Miocene, blocking westerlies from coming into the Tarim Basin and drying it as a result.

At the beginning of the Miocene, the northern margin of the Arabian plate, then part of the African landmass, collided with Eurasia; as a result, the Tethys seaway continued to shrink and then disappeared as Africa collided with Eurasia in the Turkish–Arabian region. The first step of this closure occurred 20 Ma, reducing water mass exchange by 90%, while the second step occurred around 13.8 Ma, coincident with a major expansion of Antarctic glaciers. This severed the connection between the Indian Ocean and the Mediterranean Sea and formed the present land connection between Afro-Arabia and Eurasia. The subsequent uplift of mountains in the western Mediterranean region and a global fall in sea levels combined to cause a temporary drying up of the Mediterranean Sea (known as the Messinian salinity crisis) near the end of the Miocene. The Paratethys underwent a significant transgression during the early Middle Miocene. Around 13.8 Ma, during a global sea level drop, the Eastern Paratethys was cut off from the global ocean by the closure of the Bârlad Strait, effectively turning it into a saltwater lake. From 13.8 to 13.36 Ma, an evaporite period similar to the later Messinian salinity crisis in the Mediterranean ensued in the Central Paratethys, cut off from sources of freshwater input by its separation from the Eastern Paratethys. From 13.36 to 12.65 Ma, the Central Paratethys was characterised by open marine conditions, before the reopening of the Bârlad Strait resulted in a shift to brackish-marine conditions in the Central Paratethys, causing the Badenian-Sarmatian Extinction Event. As a result of the Bârlad Strait's reopening, the lake levels of the Eastern Paratethys dropped as it once again became a sea.

The Fram Strait opened during the Miocene and acted as the only throughflow for Atlantic Water into the Arctic Ocean until the Quaternary period. Due to regional uplift of the continental shelf, this water could not move through the Barents Seaway in the Miocene.

The modern day Mekong Delta took shape after 8 Ma. Geochemistry of the Qiongdongnan Basin in the northern South China Sea indicates the Pearl River was a major source of sediment flux into the sea during the Early Miocene and was a major fluvial system as in the present.

=== South America ===
During the Oligocene and Early Miocene, the coast of northern Brazil, Colombia, south-central Peru, central Chile and large swathes of inland Patagonia were subject to a marine transgression. The transgressions in the west coast of South America are thought to be caused by a regional phenomenon while the steadily rising central segment of the Andes represents an exception. While there are numerous registers of Oligocene–Miocene transgressions around the world it is doubtful that these correlate.

It is thought that the Oligocene–Miocene transgression in Patagonia could have temporarily linked the Pacific and Atlantic Oceans, as inferred from the findings of marine invertebrate fossils of both Atlantic and Pacific affinity in La Cascada Formation. Connection would have occurred through narrow epicontinental seaways that formed channels in a dissected topography.

The Antarctic Plate started to subduct beneath South America 14 million years ago in the Miocene, forming the Chile Triple Junction. At first the Antarctic Plate subducted only in the southernmost tip of Patagonia, meaning that the Chile Triple Junction lay near the Strait of Magellan. As the southern part of Nazca Plate and the Chile Rise became consumed by subduction the more northerly regions of the Antarctic Plate begun to subduct beneath Patagonia so that the Chile Triple Junction advanced to the north over time. The asthenospheric window associated to the triple junction disturbed previous patterns of mantle convection beneath Patagonia inducing an uplift of ca. 1 km that reversed the Oligocene–Miocene transgression.

As the southern Andes rose in the Middle Miocene (14–12 million years ago) the resulting rain shadow originated the Patagonian Desert to the east.

=== Australia ===
Far northern Australia was monsoonal during the Miocene. Although northern Australia is often believed to have been much wetter during the Miocene, this interpretation may be an artefact of preservation bias of riparian and lacustrine plants; this finding has itself been challenged by other papers. Western Australia, like today, was arid, particularly so during the Middle Miocene.

== Climate ==
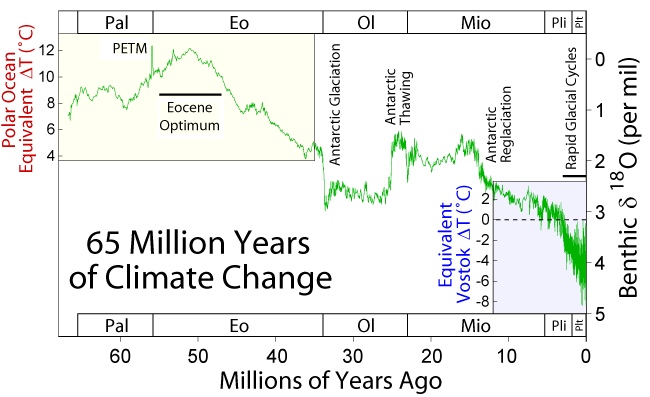

Climates remained moderately warm, although the slow global cooling that eventually led to the Pleistocene glaciations continued. Although a long-term cooling trend was well under way, there is evidence of a warm period during the Miocene when the global climate rivalled that of the Oligocene. The climate of the Miocene has been suggested as a good analogue for future warmer climates caused by anthropogenic global warming, with this being especially true of the global climate during the Middle Miocene Climatic Optimum (MMCO), because that was the last time CO_{2} levels were comparable to projected future atmospheric CO_{2} levels resulting from anthropogenic climate change. The Ross Sea margin of the East Antarctic Ice Sheet (EAIS) was highly dynamic during the Early Miocene.

The Miocene began with the Early Miocene Cool Event (Mi-1) around 23 million years ago, which marked the start of the Early Miocene Cool Interval (EMCI). This cool event occurred immediately after the Oligocene-Miocene Transition (OMT) during a major expansion of Antarctica's ice sheets, but was not associated with a significant drop in atmospheric CO_{2} levels. Both continental and oceanic thermal gradients in mid-latitudes during the Early Miocene were very similar to those at present. Global cooling caused the East Asian Summer Monsoon (EASM) to begin to take on its modern form during the Early Miocene. From 22.1 to 19.7 Ma, the Xining Basin experienced relative warmth and humidity amidst a broader aridification trend.

The EMCI ended 18 million years ago, giving way to the Middle Miocene Warm Interval (MMWI), the warmest part of which was the MMCO, which began 16 million years ago. As the world transitioned into the MMCO, CO_{2} concentrations varied between 300 and 500 ppm. Global annual mean surface temperature during the MMCO was about 18.4 °C. MMCO warmth was driven by the activity of the Columbia River Basalts and enhanced by decreased albedo from the reduction of deserts and expansion of forests. Climate modelling suggests additional, currently unknown, factors also worked to create the warm conditions of the MMCO. The MMCO saw the expansion of the tropical climatic zone to much larger than its current size. The July ITCZ, the zone of maximal monsoonal rainfall, moved to the north, increasing precipitation over southern China whilst simultaneously decreasing it over Indochina during the EASM. Topographic changes in Africa caused the Somali Jet to weaken, while South Asian Summer Monsoon (SASM) rainfall increased. Western Australia was at this time exceptionally arid. In Antarctica, average summer temperatures on land reached 10 °C. In the oceans, the lysocline shoaled by about 0.5 km during warm phases that corresponded to orbital eccentricity maxima. The MMCO ended around 14 million years ago, when global temperatures fell in the Middle Miocene Climate Transition (MMCT). Abrupt increases in opal deposition indicate this cooling was driven by enhanced drawdown of CO_{2} via silicate weathering. The MMCT caused a sea surface temperature (SST) drop of approximately 6 °C in the North Atlantic. The drop in benthic foraminiferal δ^{18}O values was most noticeable in the waters around Antarctica, suggesting cooling was most intense there. Around this time the Mi3b glacial event (a massive expansion of Antarctic glaciers) occurred. The East Antarctic Ice Sheet (EAIS) markedly stabilised following the MMCT. The intensification of glaciation caused a decoherence of sediment deposition from the 405 kyr eccentricity cycle.

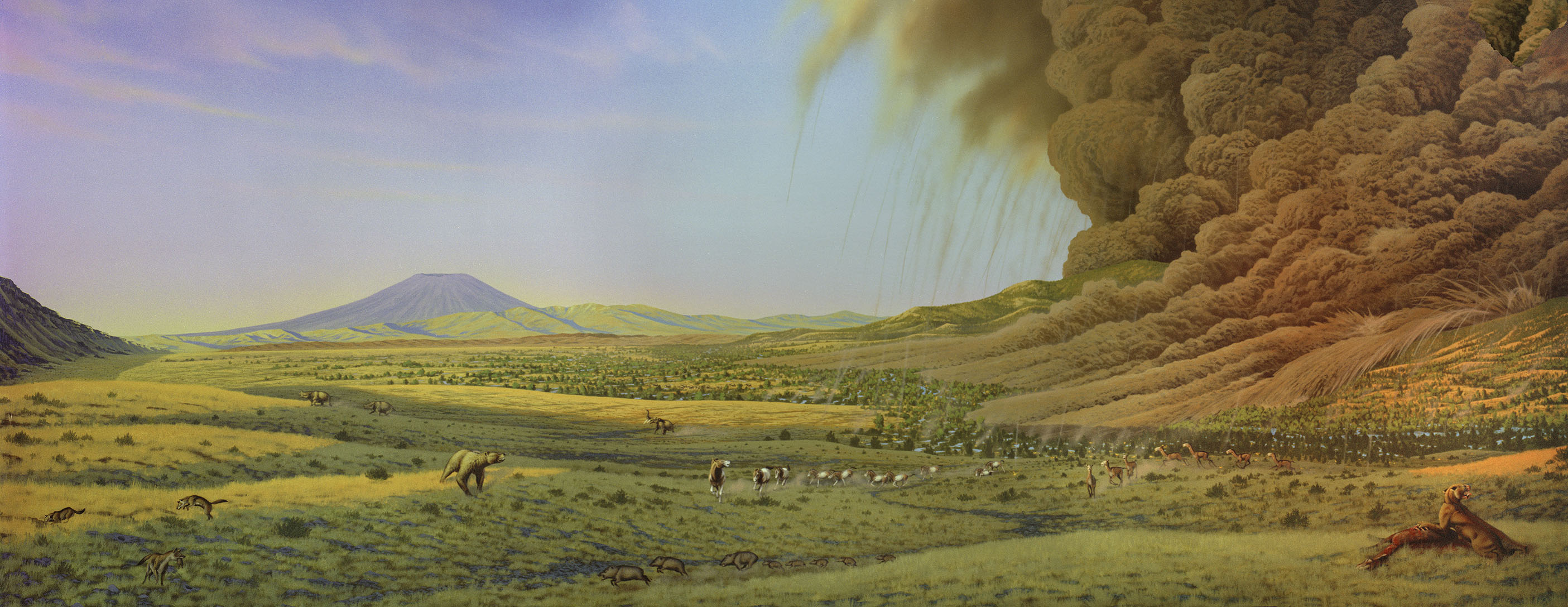
Restoration of the volcanic eruption in Harney Basin, of the western US, represented by the Rattlesnake Formation

=== 12 Ma onwards ===
The MMWI ended about 11 Ma, when the Late Miocene Cool Interval (LMCI) started. A major but transient warming occurred around 10.8-10.7 Ma. During the Late Miocene, the Earth's climate began to display a high degree of similarity to that of the present day. The 173 kyr obliquity modulation cycle governed by Earth's interactions with Saturn became detectable in the Late Miocene. By 12 Ma, Oregon was a savanna akin to that of the western margins of the Sierra Nevada of northern California. Central Australia became progressively drier, although southwestern Australia experienced significant wettening from around 12 to 8 Ma. The South Asian Winter Monsoon (SAWM) underwent strengthening ~9.2–8.5 Ma. From 7.9 to 5.8 Ma, the East Asian Winter Monsoon (EAWM) became stronger synchronously with a southward shift of the subarctic front. Greenland may have begun to have large glaciers as early as 8 to 7 Ma, although the climate for the most part remained warm enough to support forests there well into the Pliocene. Zhejiang, China was noticeably more humid than today. In the Great Rift Valley of Kenya, there was a gradual and progressive trend of increasing aridification, though it was not unidirectional, and wet humid episodes continued to occur. Between 7 and 5.3 Ma, temperatures dropped sharply again in the Late Miocene Cooling (LMC), most likely as a result of a decline in atmospheric carbon dioxide and a drop in the amplitude of Earth's obliquity, and the Antarctic ice sheet was approaching its present-day size and thickness. Ocean temperatures plummeted to near-modern values during the LMC; extratropical sea surface temperatures dropped substantially by approximately 7–9 °C. 41 kyr obliquity cycles became the dominant orbital climatic control 7.7 Ma and this dominance strengthened 6.4 Ma. Benthic δ^{18}O values show significant glaciation occurred from 6.26 to 5.50 Ma, during which glacial-interglacial cycles were governed by the 41 kyr obliquity cycle. A major reorganisation of the carbon cycle occurred approximately 6 Ma, causing continental carbon reservoirs to no longer expand during cold spells, as they had done during cold periods in the Oligocene and most of the Miocene. At the end of the Miocene, global temperatures rose again as the amplitude of Earth's obliquity increased, which caused increased aridity in Central Asia. Around 5.5 Ma, the EAWM underwent a period of rapid intensification.

== Life ==
Life during the Miocene Epoch was mostly supported by the two newly formed biomes, kelp forests and grasslands. Grasslands allow for more grazers, such as horses, rhinoceroses, and hippos. Ninety-five percent of modern plants existed by the end of this epoch. Modern bony fish genera were established. A modern-style latitudinal biodiversity gradient appeared ~15 Ma.

=== Flora ===
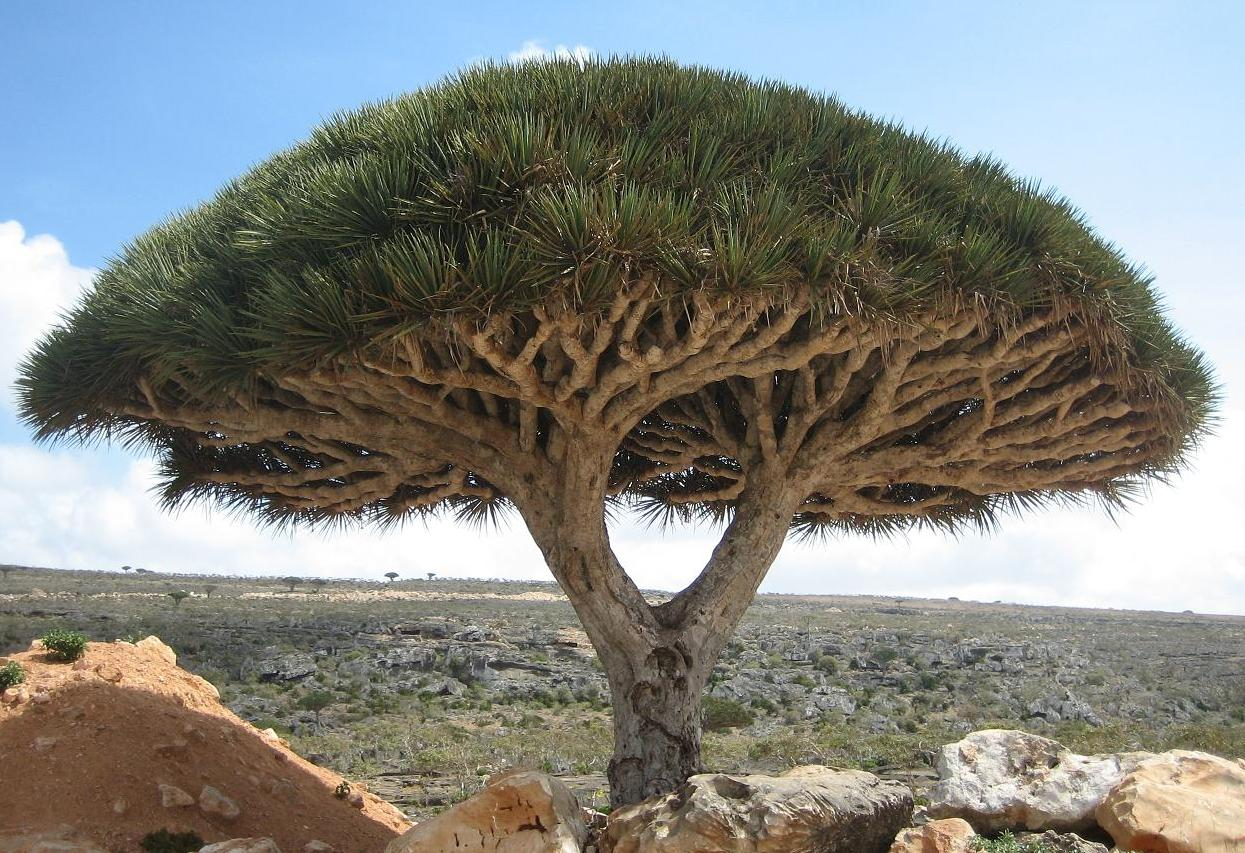
The dragon blood tree is considered a remnant of the Mio-Pliocene Laurasian subtropical forests that are now almost extinct in North Africa.

The coevolution of gritty, fibrous, fire-tolerant grasses and long-legged gregarious ungulates with high-crowned teeth, led to a major expansion of grass-grazer ecosystems. Herds of large, swift grazers were hunted by predators across broad sweeps of open grasslands, displacing desert, woodland, and browsers.

The higher organic content and water retention of the deeper and richer grassland soils, with long-term burial of carbon in sediments, produced a carbon and water vapor sink. This, combined with higher surface albedo and lower evapotranspiration of grassland, contributed to a cooler, drier climate. C_{4} grasses, which are able to assimilate carbon dioxide and water more efficiently than C_{3} grasses, expanded to become ecologically significant near the end of the Miocene between 6 and 7 million years ago, although they did not expand northward during the Late Miocene. The expansion of grasslands and radiations among terrestrial herbivores correlates to fluctuations in CO_{2}. One study, however, has attributed the expansion of grasslands not to a CO_{2} drop but to the increasing seasonality and aridity, coupled with a monsoon climate, which made wildfires highly prevalent compared to before. The Late Miocene expansion of grasslands had cascading effects on the global carbon cycle, evidenced by the imprint it left in carbon isotope records.

Cycads between 11.5 and 5 million years ago began to rediversify after previous declines in variety due to climatic changes, and thus modern cycads are not a good model for a "living fossil". Eucalyptus fossil leaves occur in the Miocene of New Zealand, where the genus is not native today, but have been introduced from Australia.

Africa experienced a significant decline in floral diversity at the start of the Miocene, likely a consequence of increasing seasonality. The continent experienced disconnection and reconnection of its equatorial forest belt throughout the Miocene.

=== Fauna ===
Hominin timeline
← / Earlier apes; ← / Gorilla split; ← / Chimpanzee split; ← / Earliest bipedal; ← / Earliest sign of Ardipithecus; ← / Earliest sign of Australopithecus; ← / Earliest stone tools; ← / Earliest sign of Homo; ← / Dispersal beyond Africa; ← / Earliest fire / cooking; ← / Earliest rock art; ← / Earliest clothes; ← / Modern humans
(million years ago)

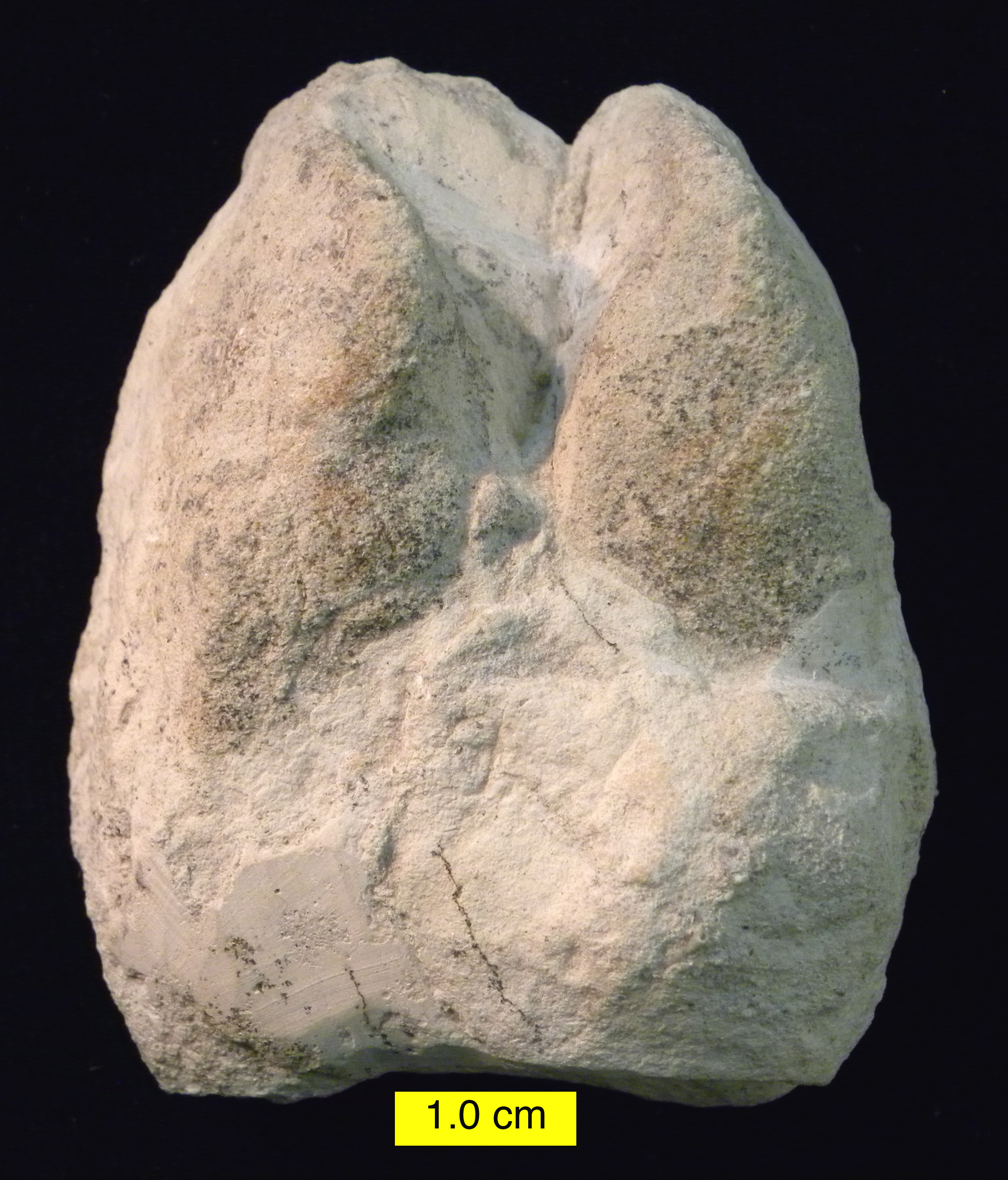
Cameloid footprint (Lamaichnum alfi Sarjeant and Reynolds, 1999; convex hyporelief) from the Barstow Formation (Miocene) of Rainbow Basin, California.

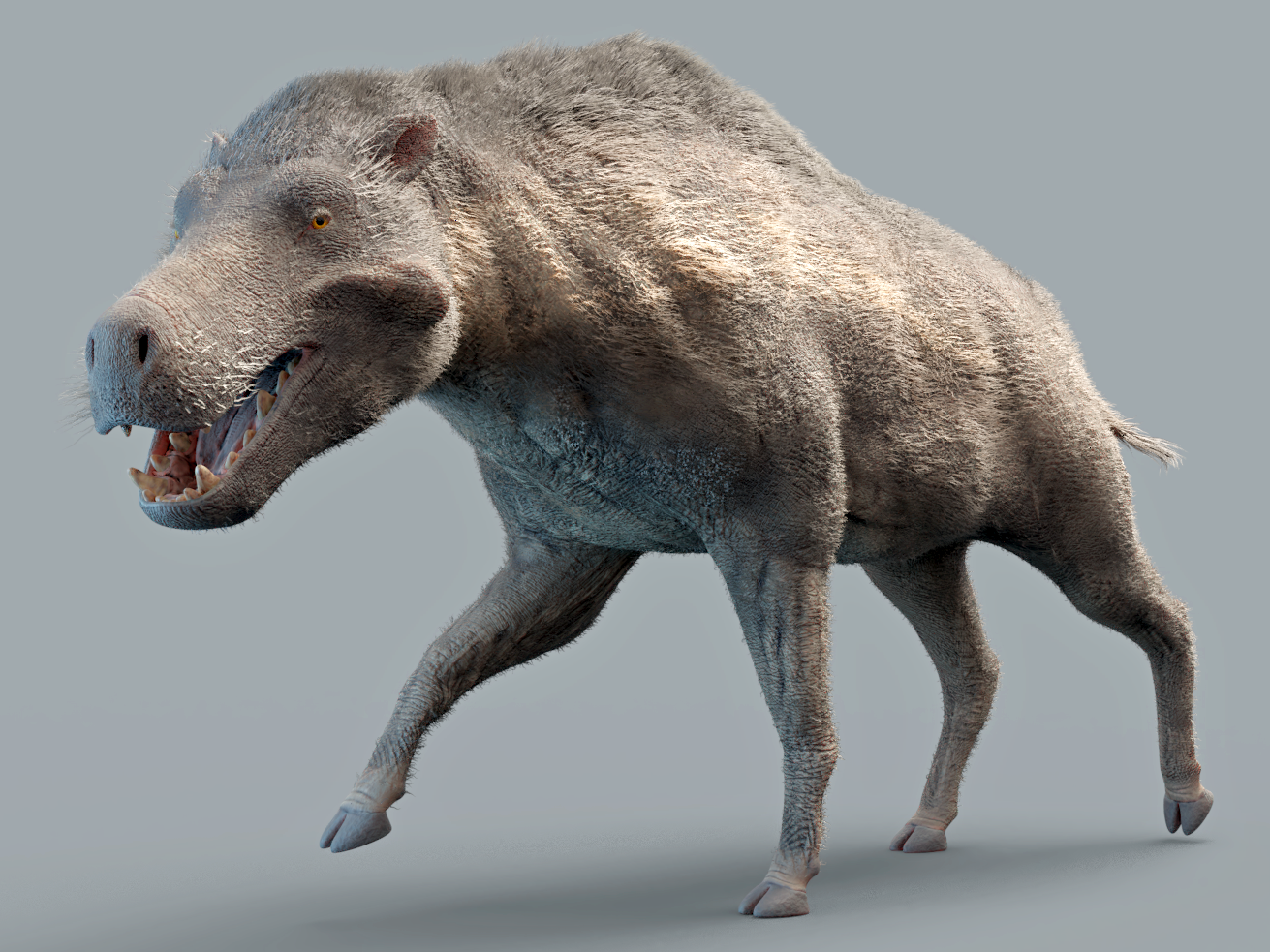
Life restoration of Daeodon

Both marine and continental fauna were fairly modern, although marine mammals were less numerous. Only in isolated South America and Australia did widely divergent fauna exist.

Australian mammals became phenotypically restricted as Miocene cooling and aridification forced the Australian fauna to remain conservative with respect to their body plans.

In Eurasia, genus richness shifted southward to lower latitudes from the Early to the Middle Miocene. Europe's large mammal diversity significantly declined during the Late Miocene. Southeastern Europe was a biodiversity hotspot, owing to its position on the boundary of forested and open landscapes.

In the Early Miocene, several Oligocene groups were still diverse, including nimravids, entelodonts, and three-toed equids. As in the previous Oligocene Epoch, oreodonts were still diverse, only to disappear in the earliest Pliocene. During the later Miocene mammals were more modern, with easily recognizable canids, bears, red pandas, procyonids, equids, beavers, deer, camelids, and whales, along with now-extinct groups like borophagine canids, certain gomphotheres, three-toed horses, and hornless rhinos like Teleoceras and Aphelos. The late Miocene also marks the extinction of the last-surviving members of the hyaenodonts. Islands began to form between South and North America in the Late Miocene, allowing ground sloths like Thinobadistes to island-hop to North America. The expansion of silica-rich C_{4} grasses led to worldwide extinctions of herbivorous species without high-crowned teeth. Mustelids diversified into their largest forms as terrestrial predators like Ekorus, Eomellivora, and Megalictis and bunodont otters like Enhydriodon and Sivaonyx appeared. Eulipotyphlans were widespread in Europe, being less diverse in Southern Europe than farther north due to the aridity of the former.

Unequivocally-recognizable dabbling ducks, plovers, typical owls, cockatoos and crows appear during the Miocene. By the epoch's end, all or almost all modern bird groups are believed to have been present; the few post-Miocene bird fossils which cannot be placed in the evolutionary tree with full confidence are simply too badly preserved, rather than too equivocal in character. Marine birds reached their highest diversity ever in the course of this epoch.

The youngest representatives of Choristodera, an extinct order of aquatic reptiles that first appeared in the Middle Jurassic, are known from the Miocene of Europe, belonging to the genus Lazarussuchus, which had been the only known surviving genus of the group since the beginning of the Eocene.

The last known representatives of the archaic primitive mammal order Meridiolestida, which dominated South America during the Late Cretaceous, are known from the Miocene of Patagonia, represented by the mole-like Necrolestes.

The youngest known representatives of non-marsupial metatherians (the broader grouping to which marsupials belong) in North America, Europe, Africa and possibly Asia are known from the Miocene, including the European herpetotheriid Amphiperatherium, Herpetotherium in North America, and the possible herpetotheriid Morotodon from the late Early Miocene of Uganda. The placement of the Miocene putative Asian peradectids Siamoperadectes and Sinoperadectes have been questioned, and they may be eutherians instead.

Approximately 100 species of apes lived during this time, ranging throughout Africa, Asia and Europe and varying widely in size, diet, and anatomy. Due to scanty fossil evidence it is unclear which ape or apes contributed to the modern hominid clade, but molecular evidence indicates this ape lived between 18 and 13 million years ago. The first hominins (bipedal apes of the human lineage) appeared in Africa at the very end of the Miocene, including Sahelanthropus, Orrorin, and an early form of Ardipithecus (A. kadabba). The chimpanzee–human divergence is thought to have occurred at this time. The evolution of bipedalism in apes at the end of the Miocene instigated an increased rate of faunal turnover in Africa. In contrast, European apes met their end at the end of the Miocene due to increased habitat uniformity.

The expansion of grasslands in North America also led to an explosive radiation among snakes. Previously, snakes were a minor component of the North American fauna, but during the Miocene, the number of species and their prevalence increased dramatically with the first appearances of vipers and elapids in North America and the significant diversification of Colubridae (including the origin of many modern genera such as Nerodia, Lampropeltis, Pituophis and Pantherophis).

Arthropods were abundant, including in areas such as Tibet where they have traditionally been thought to be undiverse. Neoisopterans diversified and expanded into areas they previously were absent from, such as Madagascar and Australia.

==== Oceanic ====
In the oceans, brown algae, called kelp, proliferated, supporting new species of sea life, including otters, fish and various invertebrates.

Corals suffered a significant local decline along the northeastern coast of Australia during the Tortonian, most likely due to warming seawater.

Cetaceans attained their greatest diversity during the Miocene, with over 20 recognized genera of baleen whales in comparison to only six living genera. This diversification correlates with emergence of gigantic macro-predators such as megatoothed sharks and raptorial sperm whales. Prominent examples are O. megalodon and L. melvillei. Other notable large sharks were O. chubutensis, Isurus hastalis, and Hemipristis serra.

Crocodilians also showed signs of diversification during the Miocene. The largest form among them was a gigantic caiman Purussaurus which inhabited South America. Another gigantic form was a false gharial Rhamphosuchus, which inhabited modern age India. A strange form, Mourasuchus also thrived alongside Purussaurus. This species developed a specialized filter-feeding mechanism, and it likely preyed upon small fauna despite its gigantic size.

The youngest members of Sebecidae, a clade of large terrestrial predatory crocodyliformes distantly related to modern crocodilians, from which they likely diverged over 180 million years ago, are known from the Miocene of South America.

The last Desmostylians thrived during this period before becoming the only extinct marine mammal order.

The pinnipeds, which appeared near the end of the Oligocene, became more aquatic. A prominent genus was Allodesmus. A ferocious walrus, Pelagiarctos may have preyed upon other species of pinnipeds including Allodesmus.

Furthermore, South American waters witnessed the arrival of Megapiranha paranensis, which were considerably larger than modern age piranhas.

New Zealand's Miocene fossil record is particularly rich. Marine deposits showcase a variety of cetaceans and penguins, illustrating the evolution of both groups into modern representatives. The early Miocene Saint Bathans Fauna is the only Cenozoic terrestrial fossil record of the landmass, showcasing a wide variety of not only bird species, including early representatives of clades such as moa, kiwi and adzebills, but also a diverse herpetofauna of sphenodontians, crocodiles and turtles as well as a rich terrestrial mammal fauna composed of various species of bats and the enigmatic Saint Bathans Mammal.

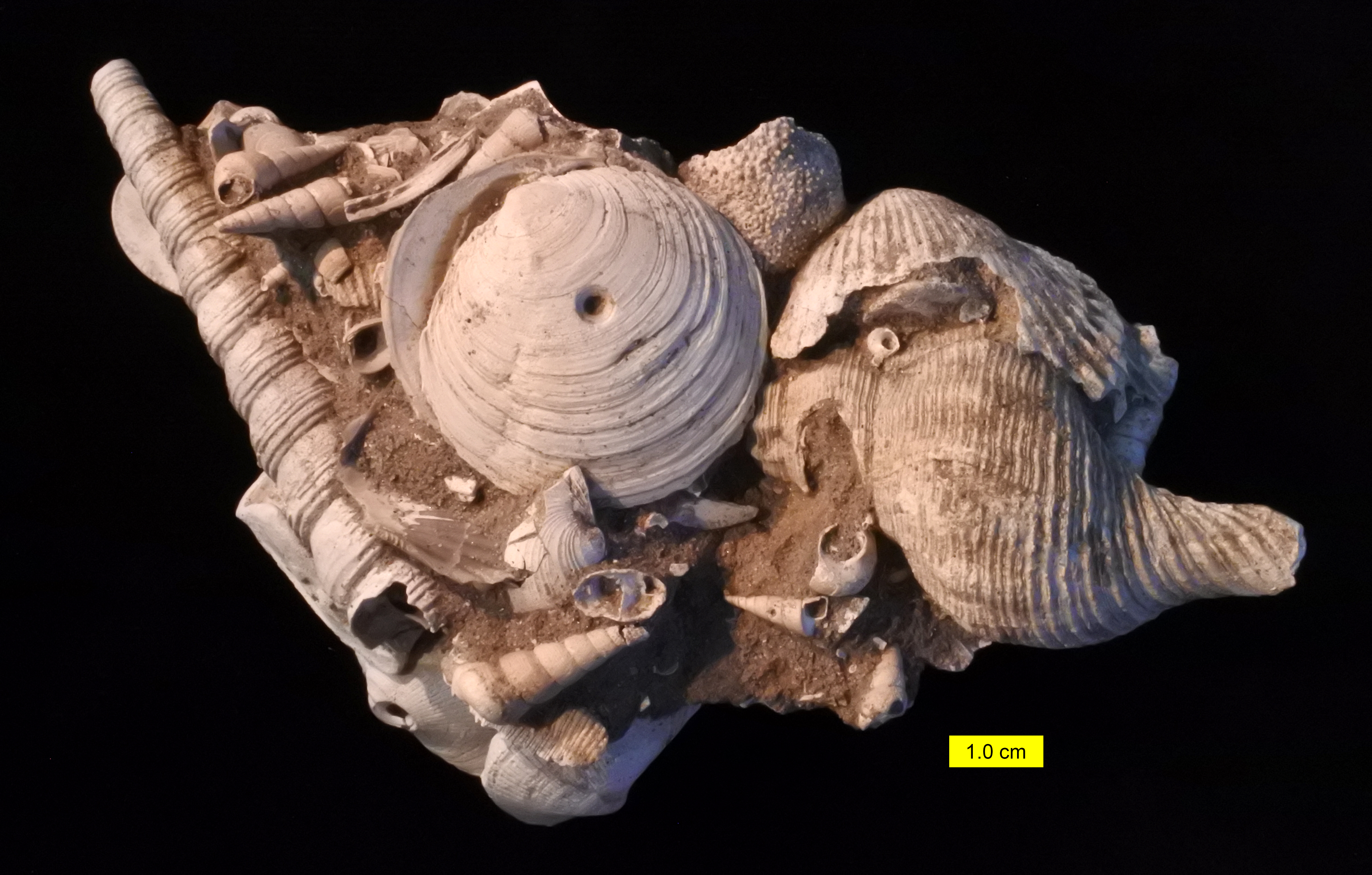
Miocene fossils from the Calvert Formation, Calvert County, Maryland, US

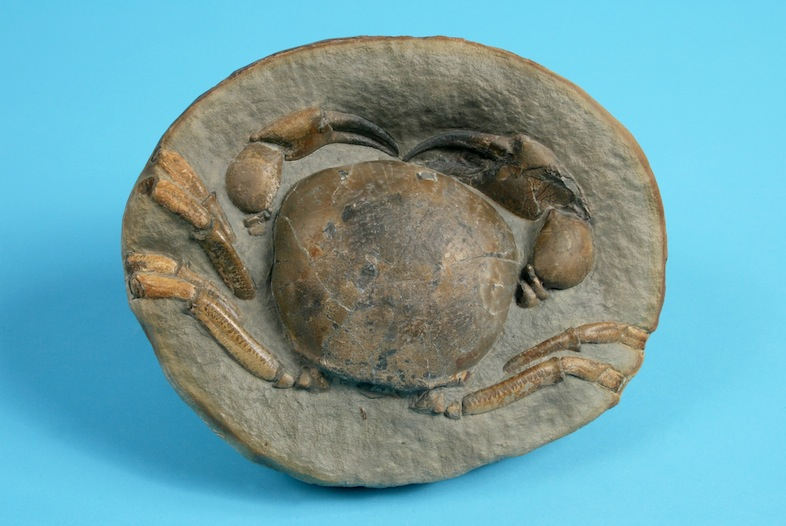
A Miocene crab (Tumidocarcinus giganteus) from the collection of the Children's Museum of Indianapolis

=== Microbiota ===
Microbial life in the igneous crust of the Fennoscandian Shield shifted from being dominated by methanogens to being primarily composed of sulphate-reducing prokaryotes. The change resulted from fracture reactivation during the Pyrenean-Alpine orogeny, enabling sulphate-reducing microbes to permeate into the Fennoscandian Shield via descending surficial waters.

Diatom diversity was inversely correlated with carbon dioxide levels and global temperatures during the Miocene. Most modern lineages of diatoms appeared by the Late Miocene.

== Oceans ==
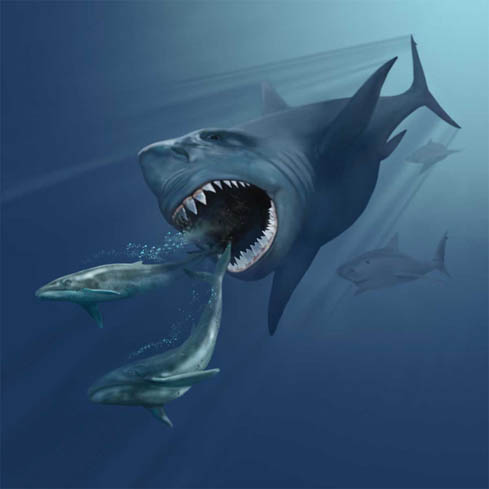
Artistic impression of two Eobalaenoptera whales pursued by the giant shark Otodus megalodon

There is evidence from oxygen isotopes at Deep Sea Drilling Program sites that ice began to build up in Antarctica about 36 Ma during the Eocene. Further marked decreases in temperature during the Middle Miocene at 15 Ma probably reflect increased ice growth in Antarctica. It can therefore be assumed that East Antarctica had some glaciers during the early to mid Miocene (23–15 Ma). Oceans cooled partly due to the formation of the Antarctic Circumpolar Current, and about 15 million years ago the ice cap in the Southern Hemisphere started to grow to its present form. The Greenland ice cap developed later, in the Middle Pliocene time, about 3 million years ago.

== Middle Miocene disruption ==
The "Middle Miocene disruption" refers to a wave of extinctions of terrestrial and aquatic life forms that occurred following the Miocene Climatic Optimum (18 to 16 Ma), around 14.8 to 14.5 million years ago, during the Langhian Stage of the mid-Miocene. A major and permanent cooling step occurred between 14.8 and 14.1 Ma, associated with increased production of cold Antarctic deep waters and a major expansion of the East Antarctic ice sheet. The closure of the Indonesian Throughflow, which caused an accumulation of warm water in the western Pacific that then spread eastward and reduced upwelling in the eastern Pacific, may also have been responsible. A Middle Miocene δ^{18}O increase, that is, a relative increase in the heavier isotope of oxygen, has been noted in the Pacific, the Southern Ocean and the South Atlantic. Barium and uranium became enriched in seafloor sediments.

== Impact event ==
A large impact event occurred during either the Miocene (23–5.3 Ma) or the Pliocene (5.3–2.6 Ma). The event formed the Karakul crater (52 km diameter) in Tajikistan, which is estimated to have an age of less than 23 Ma or less than 5 Ma.

== See also ==
- Geologic time scale
- List of fossil sites
- Category:Miocene animals
