= Mammal classification =

Taxonomy of mammals

Over 70% of mammal species are in the orders Rodentia, Chiroptera, and Eulipotyphla.
1. Rodentia (40.5%)
2. Chiroptera (22.2%)
3. Eulipotyphla (8.80%)
4. Primates (7.80%)
5. Artiodactyla (5.40%)
6. Carnivora (4.70%)
7. Diprotodontia (2.30%)
8. Didelphimorphia (1.90%)
9. Lagomorpha (1.70%)
10. Dasyuromorphia (1.30%)
11. Afrosoricida (0.80%)
12. Cingulata (0.30%)
13. Macroscelidea (0.30%)
14. Peramelemorphia (0.30%)
15. Perissodactyla (0.30%)
16. Pilosa (0.15%)
17. Scandentia (0.30%)
18. Paucituberculata (0.10%)
19. Pholidota (0.10%)
20. Hyracoidea (0.09%)
21. Monotremata (0.08%)
22. Sirenia (0.06%)
23. Proboscidea (0.05%)
24. Dermoptera (0.03%)
25. Notoryctemorphia (0.03%)
26. Microbiotheria (0.03%)
27. Tubulidentata (0.02%)

Mammalia is a class of animal within the phylum Chordata. Mammal classification has been through several iterations since Carl Linnaeus initially defined the class.

Many earlier, pre-Linnaean ideas have been completely abandoned by modern taxonomists, among these are the idea that bats are related to birds or that humans represent a group outside of other living things.

George Gaylord Simpson's classic "Principles of Classification and a Classification of Mammals" (1945) taxonomy text laid out a systematics of mammal origins and relationships that was universally taught until the end of the 20th century.

Since Simpson's 1945 classification, the paleontological record has been recalibrated, and the intervening years have seen much debate and progress concerning the theoretical underpinnings of systematization itself, partly through the new concept of cladistics. Though field work gradually made Simpson's classification outdated, it remained the closest thing to an official classification of mammals until revision from the end of the twentieth century into the twenty-first century.

No classification system is universally accepted; McKenna et al. and Wilson & Reader provide useful recent compendiums. Competing ideas about the relationships of mammal orders do persist and are currently in development. Most significantly in recent years, cladistic thinking has led to an effort to ensure that all taxonomic designations represent monophyletic groups. The field has also seen a recent surge in interest and modification due to the results of molecular phylogenetics.

See List of placental mammals and List of monotremes and marsupials for more detailed information on mammal genera and species.

== Molecular classification of placentals ==
Molecular studies by molecular systematists, based on DNA analysis, in the early 21st century have revealed new relationships among mammal families. Classification systems based on molecular studies reveal three major groups or lineages of placental mammals, Afrotheria, Xenarthra, and Boreoeutheria, which diverged from early common ancestors in the Cretaceous.

The relationships between these three lineages are contentious, and all three have been proposed as basal in different hypotheses.

The following taxonomy only includes living placentals (infraclass Eutheria):

=== Atlantogenata ===
==== Afrotheria ====
- Clade Afroinsectiphilia
  - Order Macroscelidea
    - Family Macroscelididae: (20 species), sengis or elephant shrews (Africa)
  - Order Afrosoricida
    - Family Tenrecidae: (31 species), tenrecs (Madagascar)
    - Family Potamogalidae: (3 species), otter-shrews (West and Central Africa)
    - Family Chrysochloridae: (21 species), golden moles (Africa south of the Sahara)
  - Order Tubulidentata
    - Family Orycteropodidae: (1 species), aardvark (Africa south of the Sahara)
- Clade Paenungulata
  - Order Proboscidea
    - Family Elephantidae: (3 species), elephants (Africa, Southeast Asia)
  - Order Hyracoidea
    - Family Procaviidae: (4 species), hyraxes, dassies (Africa, Arabia)
  - Order Sirenia
    - Family Dugongidae: (1 species), dugong (East Africa, Red Sea, North Australia)
    - Family Trichechidae: (3 species), manatees (tropical Atlantic coasts and adjacent rivers)

==== Xenarthra ====
- Order Cingulata
  - Family Chlamyphoridae: (14 species), armadillos (Neotropical)
  - Family Dasypodidae: (7 species), long-nosed armadillos (Neotropical and Nearctic)
- Order Pilosa (=Dasypoda)
  - Suborder Vermilingua (anteaters)
    - Family Cyclopedidae: (1 species), silky anteater (Neotropical)
    - Family Myrmecophagidae: (3 species), anteaters (Neotropical)
  - Suborder Folivora (sloths)
    - Family Choloepodidae: (2 species), two-toed sloths (Neotropical)
    - Family Bradypodidae: (4 species), three-toed sloths (Neotropical)

=== Boreoeutheria ===
==== Euarchontoglires ====
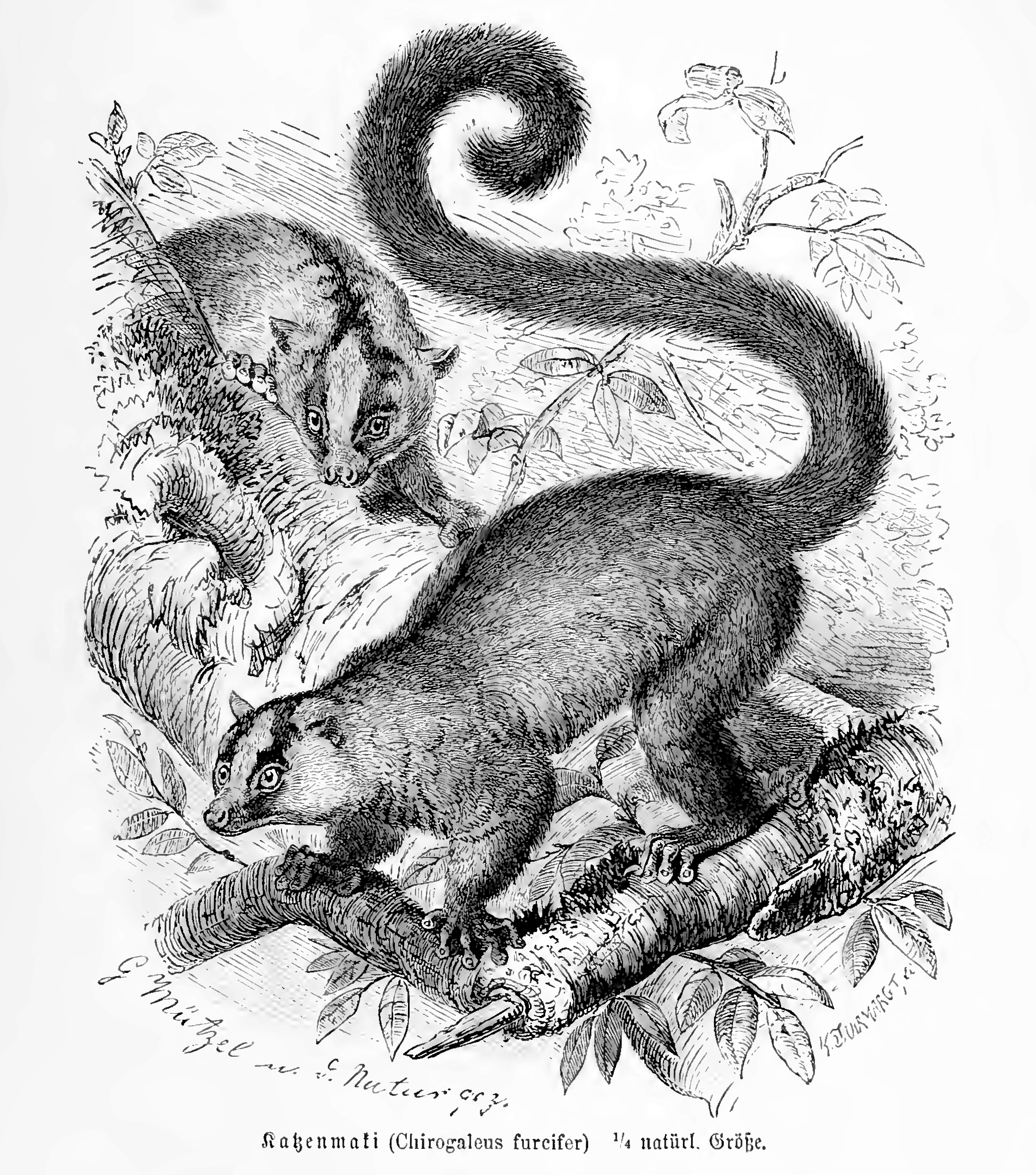
Masoala fork-marked lemur (Cheirogaleus) Phaner furcifer

- Superorder Euarchonta
  - Order Scandentia
    - Family Ptilocercidae (1 species), pen-tailed treeshrews (Southeast Asia)
    - Family Tupaiidae: (19 species), treeshrews (Southeast Asia)
  - Mirorder Primatomorpha
    - Order Dermoptera
      - Family Cynocephalidae: (2 species), flying lemurs or colugos (Southeast Asia)
    - Order Primates: lemurs, bushbabies, monkeys, apes (cosmopolitan)
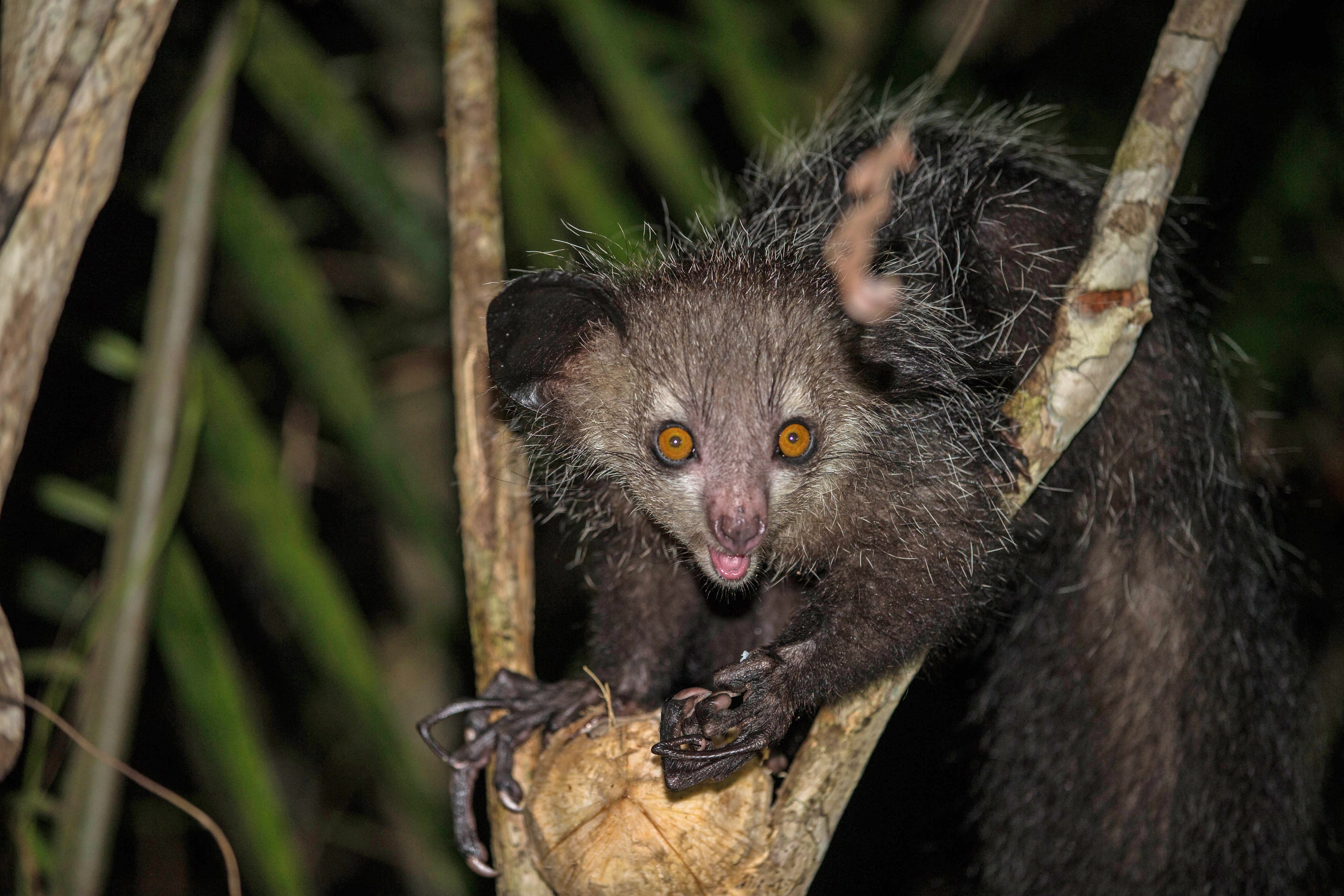
      Aye aye (Daubentonid)
      - Family Cheirogaleidae: (32 species), dwarf lemurs (Madagascar)
      - Family Lemuridae: (22 species), lemurs (Madagascar)
      - Family Lepilemuridae: (26 species), sportive lemurs (Madagascar)
      - Family Indriidae: (19 species), indri and sifakas (Madagascar)
      - Family Daubentoniidae: (1 species), aye-aye (Madagascar area)
      - Family Lorisidae: (9 species), lorises and potto (Africa and Southeast Asia)
      - Family Galagidae: (19 species), galagos (Africa)
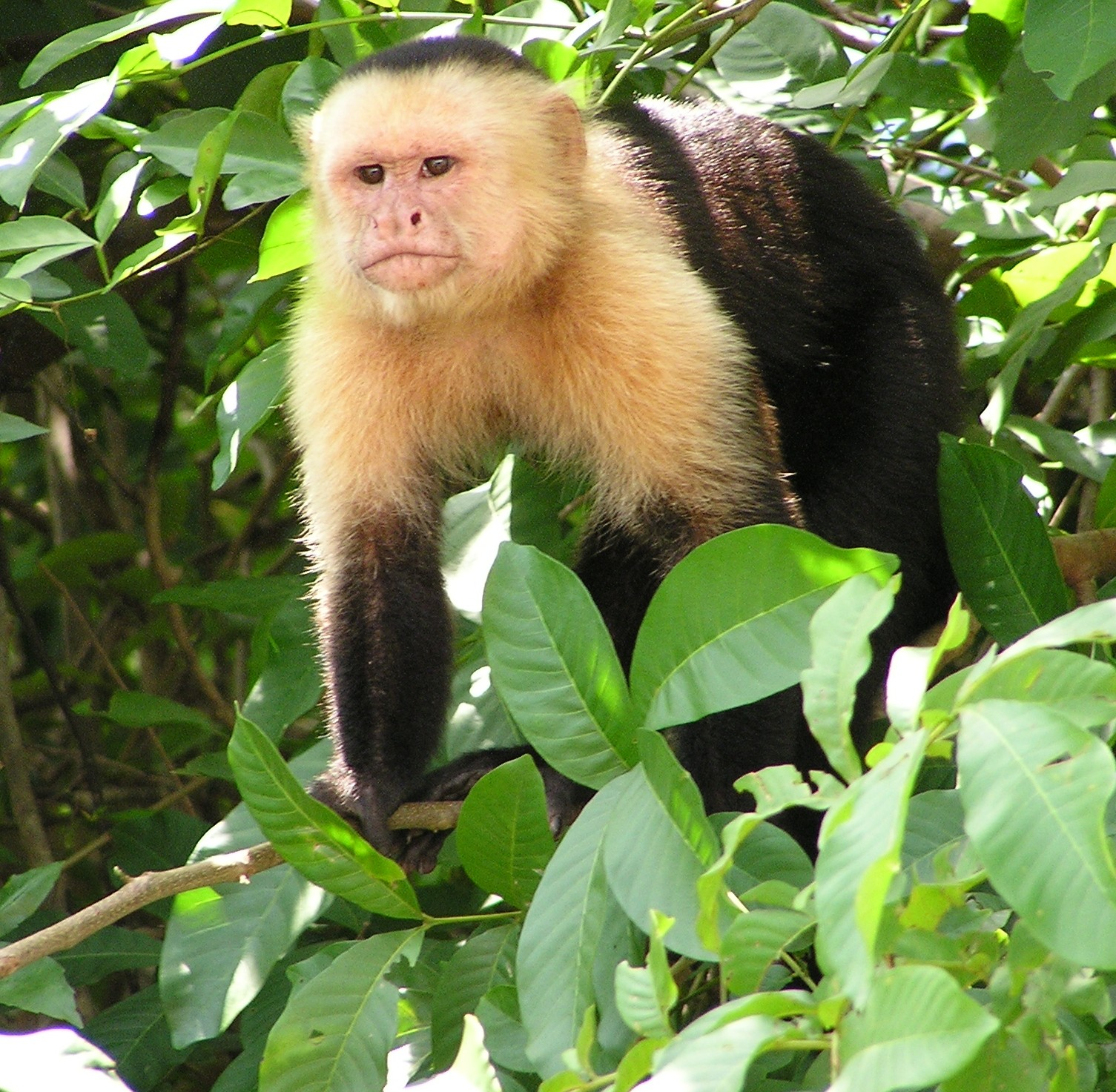
        Capuchin monkey (Cebid)
      - Family Tarsiidae: (9 species), tarsiers (Southeast Asia)
      - Family Callitrichidae: (41 species), marmosets and tamarins (South America)
      - Family Cebidae: (14 species), New World monkeys (South America)
      - Family Cercopithecidae: (137 species), Old World monkeys (Africa and Eurasia)
      - Family Hylobatidae: (14 species), gibbons (Southeast Asia)
      - Family Hominidae: (8 species), great apes (worldwide)
- Superorder Glires
  - Order Lagomorpha: pikas, rabbits, hares (Eurasia, Africa, Americas)
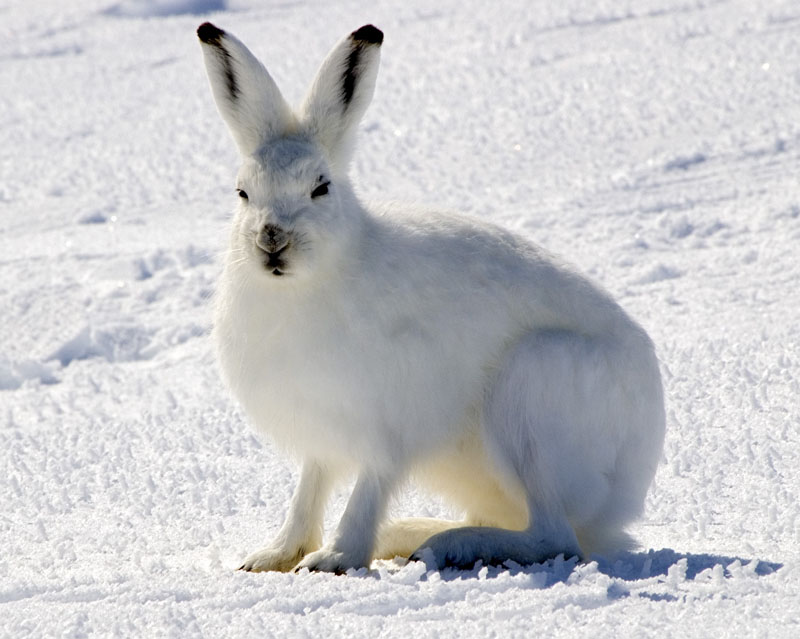
    Arctic hare (Leporid)
    - Family Leporidae: (60 species), rabbits and hares (Eurasia, Africa, Americas)
    - Family Ochotonidae: (30 species), pikas (Holarctic)
  - Order Rodentia: rodents (cosmopolitan)
    - Suborder Castorimorpha
      - Family Castoridae: (2 species) beavers (Holarctic)
      - Family Geomyidae: (about 35 species) pocket gophers (North America)
      - Family Heteromyidae: (about 59 species) kangaroo rats and kangaroo mice (North America)
    - Suborder Myomorpha
      - Family Dipodidae: (33 species) jerboas (Africa, Eurasia, North America)
      - Family Zapodidae: (11 species) jumping mice (North America, Asia)
      - Family Sicistidae: (19 species) birch mice (Eurasia)
      - Family Platacanthomyidae: (3 species) spiny dormouse (Southeast Asia)
      - Family Spalacidae: (37 species) zokors, root rats, blind mole rats (Africa, Eurasia)
      - Family Calomyscidae: (8 species) mouse-like hamsters (Asia)
      - Family Nesomyidae: (68 species) old endemic African muroids (Africa, Madagascar)
      - Family Cricetidae: (about 580 species) hamsters, voles, and New World rats and mice (Holarctic, South America)
      - Family Muridae: (about 1,383 species) Old World rats and mice and gerbils (Africa, Eurasia, Australia)
    - Suborder Anomaluromorpha
      - Family Anomaluridae: (6 species) scaly-tailed flying squirrels (Africa)
      - Family Pedetidae: (2 species) springhares or springhaas (Africa)
    - Suborder Hystricomorpha
      - Family Ctenodactylidae: (5 species) gundis (Africa, Asia)
      - Family Diatomyidae: (1 species) Laotian rock rat (Southeast Asia)
      - Family Hystricidae: (11 Species) Old World porcupines (Africa, Asia)
      - Family Bathyergidae: (about 21 species) African mole-rats (Africa)
      - Family Petromuridae: (1 species) rock dassies (Africa)
      - Family Thryonomyidae: (2 species) cane rats (Africa)
      - Family Erethizontidae: (19 species) New World porcupines (New World)
      - Family Chinchillidae: (3 species) chinchillas and viscachas (South America)
      - Family Dinomyidae: (1 species) pacarana (South America)
      - Family Caviidae: (18 species) cavies and capybara (South America)
      - Family Dasyproctidae: (13 species) agoutis and acouchis (South America)
      - Family Cuniculidae: (about 3 species) paca (South America)
      - Family Ctenomyidae: (about 60 species) tuco-tucos (South America)
      - Family Octodontidae: (14 species) degus (South America)
      - Family Abrocomidae: (9 species) chinchilla-rats (South America)
      - Family Echimyidae: spiny rats (South America)
      - Family Capromyidae: (10 species) hutias (South America)
      - Family Heptaxodontidae: giant hutias (recently extinct)
      - Family Myocastoridae: (57 species) nutrias (South America)
    - Suborder Sciuromorpha
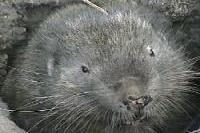
      Mountain beaver (Aplodont)
      - Family Aplodontiidae: (1 species) mountain beaver (western North America)
      - Family Sciuridae: (about 285 species) squirrels, chipmunks, and marmots (cosmopolitan except Australia)
      - Family Gliridae: (29 species) dormice (Africa, Eurasia)

==== Laurasiatheria ====
- Order Eulipotyphla
  - Family Solenodontidae: (2 species) solenodons (Cuba, Hispaniola)
  - Family Nesophontidae: nesophontes (West Indies shrews) (recently extinct)
  - Family Soricidae: (385 species) shrews (Eurasia, Africa, North America to northern South America)
  - Family Talpidae: (59 species) moles, shrew-moles, desmans (Eurasia, North America)
  - Family Erinaceidae: (26 species) hedgehogs, gymnures (Eurasia, Africa)
  - Family Galericidae: (8 species) moonrats (southeast Asia)
- Grandorder Chiroptera
  - Order Chiroptera: bats
    - Suborder Yinpterochiroptera
      - Family Pteropodidae: (about 197 species) flying foxes (Africa, Eurasia, Australia)
      - Family Hipposideridae: (84 species) trident bats, leaf-nosed bats
      - Family Rhinolophidae: (106 species) horseshoe bats (Old World)
      - Family Rhinopomatidae: (6 species) mouse-tailed bats (Africa, Southeast Asia)
      - Family Craseonycteridae: (1 species) Kitti's hog-nosed bat (Thailand)
      - Family Megadermatidae: (6 species) false vampire bats (Africa, Southeast Asia, Australia)
    - Suborder Yangochiroptera
      - Family Emballonuridae: (54 species) sac-winged bats (southern continents)
      - Family Nycteridae: (about 15 species) slit-faced bats (Africa, Southeast Asia)
      - Family Mystacinidae: (about 2 species) short-tailed bats (New Zealand)
      - Family Thyropteridae: (5 species) disk-winged bats (South America)
      - Family Furipteridae: (2 species) smoky bats (South America)
      - Family Noctilionidae: (2 species) fishing bats (South America)
      - Family Mormoopidae: (about 11 species) leaf-chinned bats (South America)
      - Family Phyllostomidae: (192 species) leaf-nosed bats (South America)
      - Family Myzopodidae: (2 species) sucker-footed bats (Madagascar)
      - Family Natalidae: (10 species) funnel-eared bats (South America)
      - Family Molossidae: (about 110 species) free-tailed bats (cosmopolitan)
      - Family Miniopteridae: (about 40 species) long-fingered bats (Africa, Eurasia, Australia)
      - Family Cistugidae: (2 species) wing-gland bats (Southern Africa)
      - Family Vespertilionidae: (over 300 species) vesper bats (cosmopolitan)
- Grandorder Ferae
  - Order Pholidota
    - Family Manidae: (about 8 species) pangolins, scaly anteaters (Africa, South Asia)
  - Order Carnivora: carnivorans (cosmopolitan)
    - Suborder Feliformia
      - Family Nandiniidae: (4 species) African palm civet (Central Africa)
      - Family Prionodontidae: (2 species) Asiatic linsangs (Southeast Asia)
      - Family Felidae: (41 species) cats (cosmopolitan except Australia)
      - Family Viverridae: (33 species) civets, Asiatic palm civets (Africa, Southern Europe, Southeast Asia)
      - Family Herpestidae: (34 species) mongooses (Africa, Asia, Southern Europe)
      - Family Eupleridae: (10 species) Malagasy carnivorans (Madagascar)
      - Family Hyaenidae: (4 species) hyaenas, aardwolf (Africa, Asia)
    - Suborder Caniformia
      - Family Canidae: (38 species) dogs (cosmopolitan)
      - Family Ursidae: (8 species) bears (Europe, Asia, New World)
      - Family Otariidae: (15 species) eared seals (cosmopolitan except North Atlantic)
      - Family Odobenidae: (1 species) walrus (Northern North American, Northern Europe, Northern Asia)
      - Family Phocidae: (18 species) true seals (cosmopolitan)
      - Family Ailuridae: (1 species) red panda (South-Central Asia)
      - Family Mephitidae: (12 species) skunks (Southeast Asia, New World)
      - Family Mustelidae: (about 69 species) weasels and relatives (cosmopolitan except Australia)
      - Family Procyonidae: (14 species) ringtails, olingos, kinkajou, raccoons, coatis (New World)
- Grandorder Euungulata
  - Order Perissodactyla: odd-toed ungulates
    - Family Equidae: (13 species) horses, zebras, donkeys (Africa, West and Central Asia)
    - Family Tapiridae: (3 species) tapirs (Central and South America, Southeast Asia)
    - Family Rhinocerotidae: (5 species) rhinoceroses (Africa, Southeast Asia)
  - Order Artiodactyla: even-toed ungulates (now includes cetaceans)
    - Suborder Suiformes
      - Family Suidae: (18 species) pigs (Africa, Eurasia)
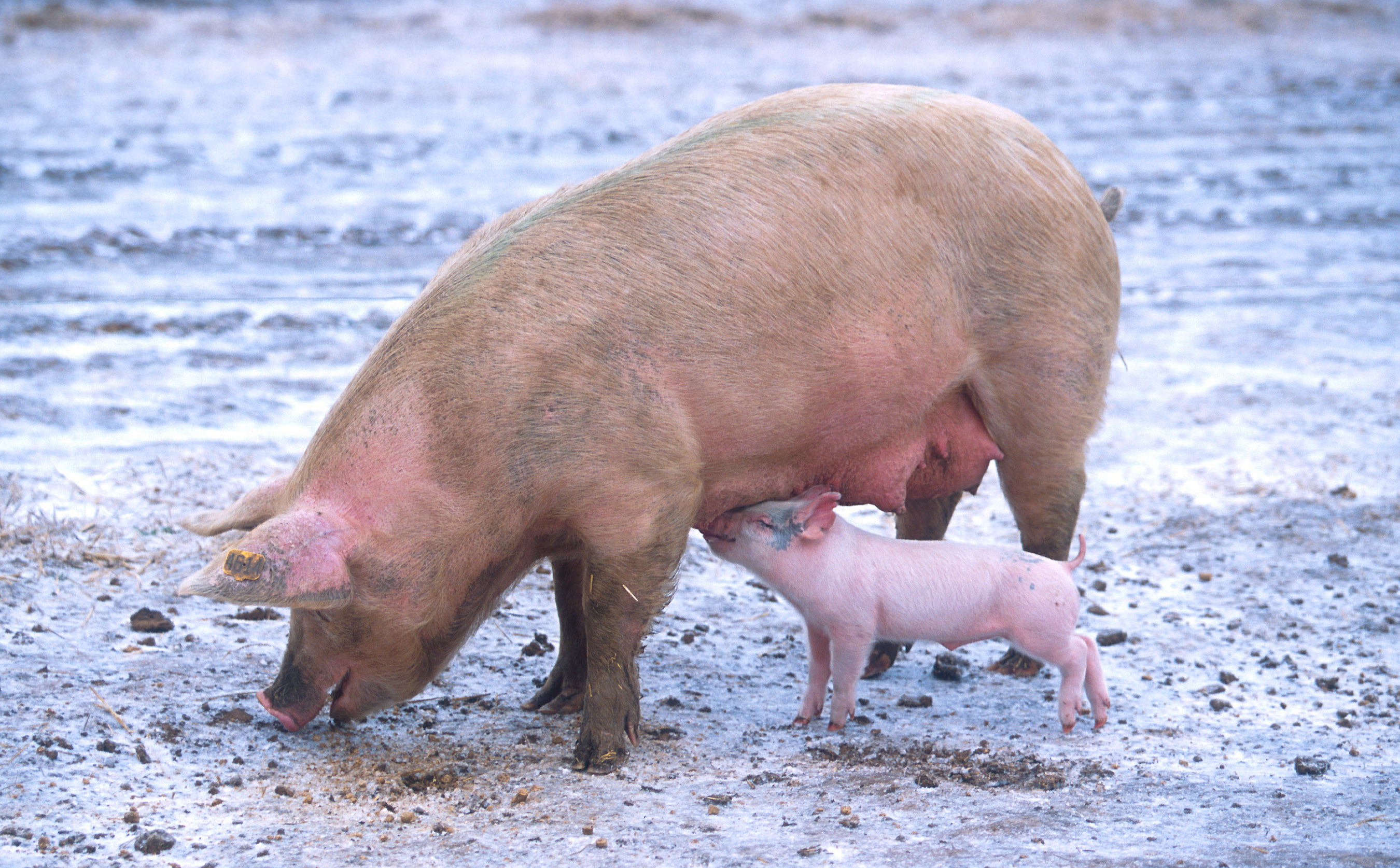
        Pig and piglet
      - Family Tayassuidae: (about 3 species) peccaries (New World)
    - Suborder Tylopoda
      - Family Camelidae: (7 species) camels (South America, Asia)
    - Suborder Ruminantia
      - Family Tragulidae: (10 species) mouse-deer (Africa, Asia)
      - Family Antilocapridae: (1 species) pronghorn (North America)
      - Family Giraffidae: (2-9 species) giraffe and okapi (Africa)
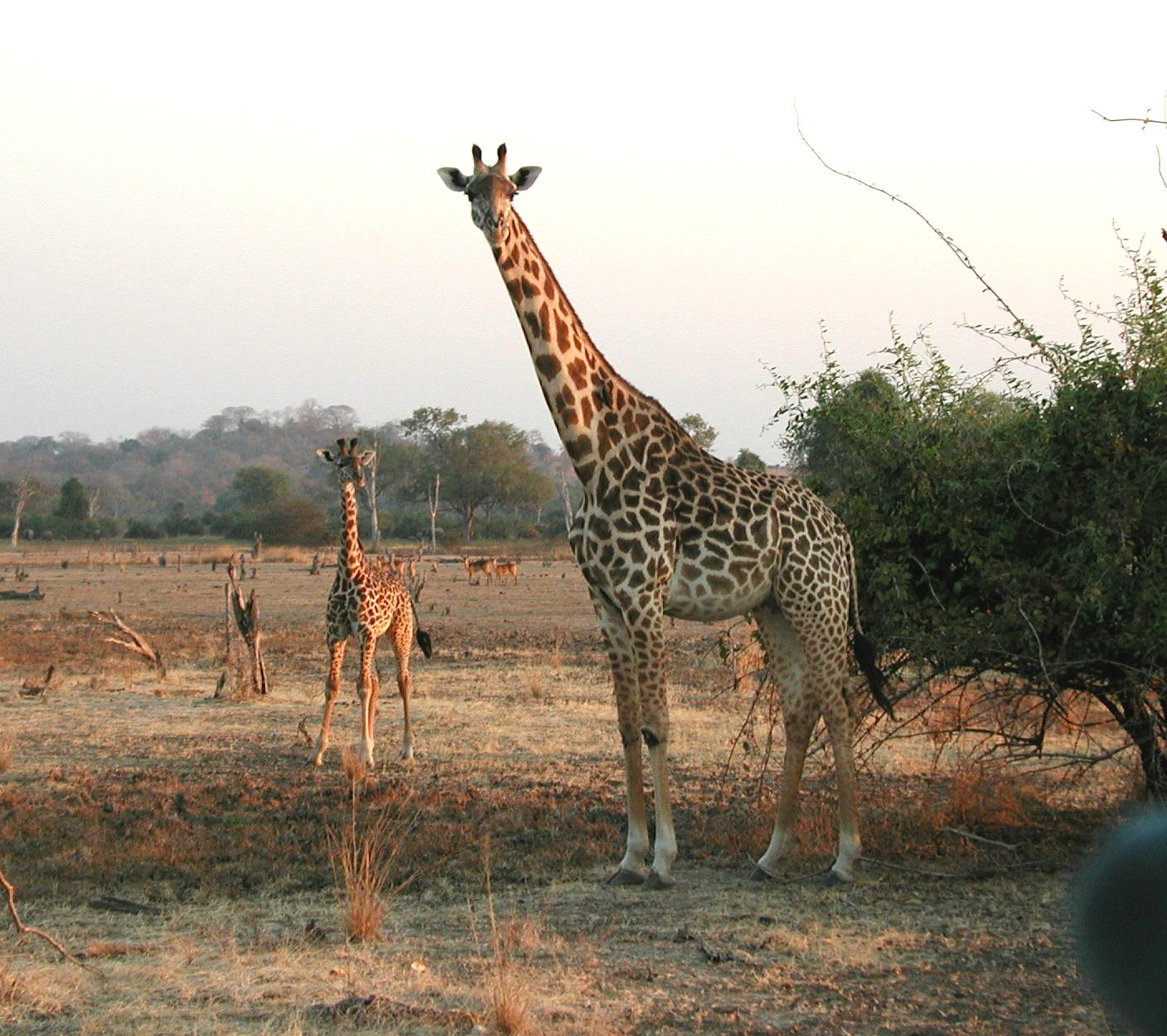
        Giraffe
      - Family Cervidae: (26 species) deer (Holarctic, South America)
      - Family Moschidae: (7 species) musk deer (Asia)
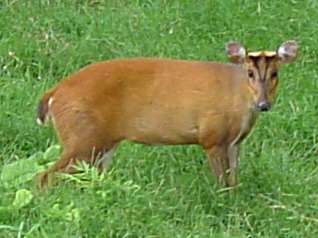
        Muntjac deer
      - Family Bovidae: (143 species) cattle, antelope, sheep, etc. (Africa, Holarctic)
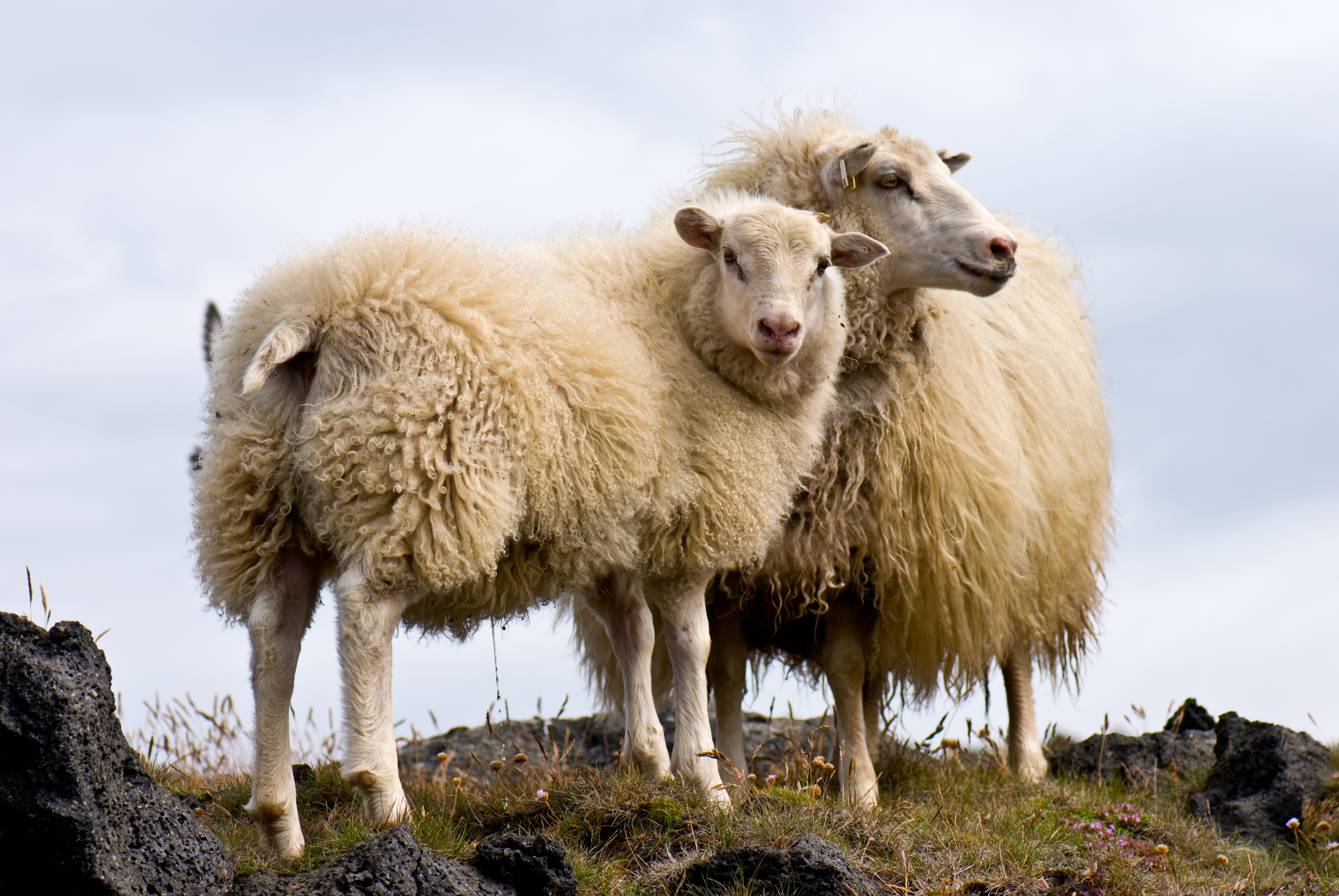
        Pair of Icelandic sheep
    - Suborder Whippomorpha
      - Family Hippopotamidae: (2 species) hippos (Africa)
      - Infraorder Cetacea
        - Parvorder Mysticeti
          - Family Balaenopteridae: (10 species) rorquals and grey whales (cosmopolitan)
          - Family Balaenidae: (4 species) right and bowhead whales (polar and temperate waters)
          - Family Eschrichtiidae: (1 species) gray whale (North Pacific and North Atlantic)
          - Family Neobalaenidae: (1 species) pygmy right whales (southern hemisphere)
        - Parvorder Odontoceti
          - Family Delphinidae: (about 37 species) dolphins (cosmopolitan)
          - Family Monodontidae: (2 species) beluga and narwhal (Arctic, Atlantic, and Pacific)
          - Family Phocoenidae: (8 species) porpoises (cosmopolitan)
          - Family Physeteridae: (3 species) sperm whales (cosmopolitan)
          - Family Kogiidae: (2 species) dwarf sperm whales (cosmopolitan)
          - Family Platanistidae: (2 species) South Asian river dolphin (Southern Asia)
          - Family Iniidae: (1-4 species) Amazon River dolphin (South America)
          - Family Pontoporiidae: (1 species) La Plata River dolphin (South America)
          - Family Lipotidae: baiji
          - Family Ziphiidae: (24 species) beaked whales (cosmopolitan)

== Standardized textbook classification ==
A somewhat standardized classification system has been adopted by most current mammalogy classroom textbooks. The following taxonomy of extant and recently extinct mammals is taken from the 6th edition of Vaughan's Mammalogy. This approach emphasizes an initial split between egg-laying prototherians and live-bearing therians. The therians are further divided into the marsupial Metatheria and the "placental" Eutheria. No attempt is made in this classification to further distinguish among the orders within these subclasses and infraclasses. This system also makes no note of the position of entirely fossil groups.

In this and later taxonomies, families are merely listed under the order to which they belong. More detailed relationships among families is presented in the article of each order.

=== Subclass Prototheria/Yinotheria ===
- Order Monotremata
  - Family Tachyglossidae (echidnas)
  - Family Ornithorhynchidae (platypuses)

=== Subclass Theria ===
- Infraclass Metatheria (marsupials and their nearest ancestors)
  - Order Didelphimorphia
    - Family Didelphidae (opossums, etc.)
  - Order Paucituberculata
    - Family Caenolestidae (shrew opossums)
  - Order Microbiotheria
    - Family Microbiotheriidae (monitos del monte)
  - Order Dasyuromorphia (most carnivorous marsupials)
    - Family Thylacinidae (Tasmanian tigers)
    - Family Myrmecobiidae (numbats)
    - Family Dasyuridae (Tasmanian devils, quolls, dunnarts, planigale, etc.)
  - Order Peramelemorphia (bandicoots, bilbies, etc.)
    - Family Peramelidae (bandicoots, echymiperas)
    - Family †Chaeropodidae (pig-footed bandicoot)
  - Order Notoryctemorphia (marsupial moles)
    - Family Notoryctidae
  - Order Diprotodontia
    - Family Phascolarctidae (koalas)
    - Family Vombatidae (wombats)
    - Family Phalangeridae (brushtail possums and cuscuses)
    - Family Potoroidae (bettongs, potoroos and rat kangaroos)
    - Family Macropodidae (kangaroos, wallabies, etc.)
    - Family Burramyidae (pygmy possums)
    - Family Pseudocheiridae (ringtailed possums, etc.)
    - Family Petauridae (striped possum, Leadbeater's possum, yellow-bellied glider, sugar glider, mahogany glider and squirrel glider)
    - Family Tarsipedidae (honey possum)
    - Family Acrobatidae (feathertail glider and feather-tailed possum)
    - Family Hypsiprymnodontidae (musky rat kangaroo)
- Infraclass Eutheria
  - Order Afrosoricida
    - Family Tenrecidae (tenrecs)
    - Family Chrysochloridae (golden moles)
  - Order Macroscelidea
    - Family Macroscelididae (elephant-shrews)
  - Order Tubulidentata
    - Family Orycteropodidae (aardvark)
  - Order Proboscidea
    - Family Elephantidae (elephants)
  - Order Sirenia
    - Family Dugongidae (dugongs, sea cows)
    - Family Trichechidae (manatees)
  - Order Hyracoidea
    - Family Procaviidae (hyraxes)
  - Order Pilosa
    - Family Bradypodidae (three-toed tree sloths)
    - Family Megalonychidae (two-toed tree sloths)
    - Family Myrmecophagidae (tamanduas and giant anteater)
    - Family Cyclopedidae (silky anteater)
  - Order Cingulata
    - Family Dasypodidae (armadillos)
  - Order Dermoptera
    - Family Cynocephalidae (colugos)
  - Order Scandentia
    - Family Tupaiidae (tree shrews)
    - Family Ptilocercidae (pen-tailed treeshrew)
  - Order Primates
    - Family Cheirogaleidae (dwarf lemurs, mouse lemurs)
    - Family Lemuridae (lemurs)
    - Family Lepilemuridae (sportive lemurs)
    - Family Indriidae (wooly lemurs, sifakas)
    - Family Daubentoniidae (aye-aye)
    - Family Lorisidae (lorises)
    - Family Galagidae (bushbabies, galagos)
    - Family Tarsiidae (tarsiers)
    - Family Cebidae (marmosets, tamarins, capuchins, squirrel monkeys)
    - Family Aotidae (night monkeys)
    - Family Pitheciidae (titis, uacaris, sakis)
    - Family Atelidae (howlers, spider monkeys, wooly monkeys)
    - Family Cercopithecidae (Old World monkeys)
    - Family Hylobatidae (gibbons)
    - Family Hominidae (apes, human)
  - Order Rodentia
    - Family Aplodontiidae (sewellel or mountain beaver)
    - Family Sciuridae (squirrels)
    - Family Gliridae (dormice)
    - Family Castoridae (beavers)
    - Family Heteromyidae (kangaroo rats, pocket mice)
    - Family Geomyidae (pocket gophers)
    - Family Dipodidae (jerboas, birch mice, jumping mice)
    - Family Platacanthomyidae (tree mice)
    - Family Spalacidae (zokors, bamboo rats, mole rats)
    - Family Calomyscidae (calomyscuses)
    - Family Nesomyidae (pouched rats and mice, climbing and fat mice, etc.)
    - Family Cricetidae (voles, hamsters, New World rats and mice
    - Family Muridae (rats, mice)
    - Family Anomaluridae (scaily-tailed flying squirrels)
    - Family Pedetidae (springhaas, springhares)
    - Family Ctenodactylidae (gundis)
    - Family Diatomyidae (kha-nyous or Laotian rock rat)
    - Family Bathyergidae (mole-rats)
    - Family Hystricidae (African and Asian porcupines)
    - Family Petromuridae (dassie rat)
    - Family Thryonomyidae (can rats)
    - Family Erethizontidae (bristle-spined rat and New World porcupines)
    - Family Chinchillidae (chinchillas, vizcachas)
    - Family Dinomyidae (pacarana)
    - Family Caviidae (cuis, guinea-pigs, cavies, maras, capybaras)
    - Family Dasyproctidae (agoutis, acouchis)
    - Family Cuniculidae (pacas)
    - Family Ctenomyidae (tuco-tucos)
    - Family Octodontidae (degus, rock rats, vizcacha-rats)
    - Family Abrocomidae (chinchilla rats)
    - Family Echimyidae (spiny rats, tree rats, hutias, & coypu)
    - Family †Heptaxodontidae (giant hutias and key mice)
  - Order Lagomorpha
    - Family Ochotonidae (pikas)
    - Family †Prolagidae (Sardinian pika)
    - Family Leporidae (rabbits)
  - Order Eulipotyphla
    - Family Erinaceidae (hedgehogs, gymnures)
    - Family †Nesophontidae (nesophontes)
    - Family Solenodontidae (solenodons, alamiquis)
    - Family Soricidae (shrews)
    - Family Talpidae (moles, desmans)
  - Order Chiroptera
    - Family Pteropodidae (Old World fruit bats, flying foxes)
    - Family Rhinopomatidae (mouse-tailed bats)
    - Family Craseonycteridae (hog-nosed or bumblebee bat)
    - Family Megadermatidae (false vampire bats)
    - Family Rhinolophidae (horseshoe bats)
    - Family Emballonuridae (sac-winged bats)
    - Family Nycteridae (slit-faced bats)
    - Family Myzopodidae (sucker-footed bats)
    - Family Mystacinidae (New Zealand short-tailed bats)
    - Family Thyropteridae (disk-winged bats)
    - Family Furipteridae (smokey bat and thumbless bat)
    - Family Noctilionidae (bulldog bats)
    - Family Mormoopidae (mustached and ghost-faced bats)
    - Family Phyllostomidae (New World leaf-nosed bats)
    - Family Natalidae (funnel-eared bats)
    - Family Molossidae (free-tailed bats)
    - Family Vespertilionidae (evening bats, common bats)
    - Family Miniopteridae (bent-winged or long-fingered bats)
  - Order Pholidota
    - Family Manidae (pangolins)
  - Order Carnivora
    - Family Felidae (cats)
    - Family Viverridae (civets, genets)
    - Family Eupleridae (falanouc, fossa, Madagascaran mongooses)
    - Family Nandiniidae (African palm civet)
    - Family Herpestidae (mongooses)
    - Family Hyaenidae (hyaenas, aardwolf)
    - Family Canidae (wolves, foxes, jackals)
    - Family Ursidae (bears, giant panda)
    - Family Odobenidae (walrus)
    - Family Otariidae (eared seals, fur seals, sea lions)
    - Family Phocidae (earless seals)
    - Family Mustelidae (weasels, badgers, otters)
    - Family Procyonidae (raccoons, ringtails, coatis)
    - Family Ailuridae (red panda)
  - Order Perissodactyla
    - Family Equidae (horses, asses, zebras)
    - Family Tapiridae (tapirs)
    - Family Rhinocerotidae (rhinoceroses)
  - Order Artiodactyla
    - Family Suidae (hogs, pigs)
    - Family Tayassuidae (peccaries)
    - Family Hippopotamidae (hippopotamuses)
    - Family Camelidae (camels, vicunas, guanacos, llamas)
    - Family Tragulidae (chevrotains and mouse deer)
    - Family Moschidae (musk deer)
    - Family Cervidae (deer)
    - Family Antilocapridae (pronghorn)
    - Family Giraffidae (giraffe and okapi)
    - Family Bovidae (antelope, bison, cattle, duikers, goats, sheep, etc.)
  - Order Cetacea
    - Family Balaenidae (right whales)
    - Family Balaenopteridae (rorquals)
    - Family Eschrichtiidae (gray whales)
    - Family Cetotheriidae (pygmy right whale)
    - Family Delphinidae (ocean dolphins)
    - Family Monodontidae (narwhal and beluga)
    - Family Phocoenidae (porpoises)
    - Family Physeteridae (sperm whales)
    - Family Platanistidae (Ganges and Indus river dolphins)
    - Family Iniidae (baiji, franciscana, and Amazon river dolphins)
    - Family Ziphiidae (beaked whales)

== McKenna/Bell classification ==
In 1997, Simpson's classification of mammals was revised by Malcolm C. McKenna and Susan K. Bell. The Classification of Mammals Above the species level, here referred to as the "McKenna/Bell classification", is a comprehensive work on the systematics, relationships, and occurrences of all mammal taxa, living and extinct, down through the rank of genus. The authors worked together as paleontologists at the American Museum of Natural History, New York. McKenna inherited the project from Simpson and, with Bell, constructed a completely updated hierarchical system, covering living and extinct taxa that reflects the historical genealogy of Mammalia.

The McKenna/Bell hierarchical listing of all of the terms used for mammal groups above the species includes extinct mammals as well as modern groups, and introduces some fine distinctions such as legions and sublegions and ranks which fall between classes and orders that are likely to be glossed over by the layman.

Click on the highlighted link for a table comparing the traditional and the new McKenna/Bell classifications of mammals.

Extinct groups are represented by †.

=== Subclass Prototheria ===
(monotremes)

- Order Platypoda: platypuses
  - Family Ornithorhynchidae: platypuses
- Order Tachyglossa: echidnas (spiny anteaters)
  - Family Tachyglossidae: echidnas

=== Subclass Theriiformes ===
- Infraclass †Allotheria
  - Order †Multituberculata: multituberculates
    - Family †Plagiaulacidae
    - Family †Bolodontidae
    - Family †Hahnodontidae
    - Family †Albionbaataridae
    - Family †Arginbaataridae
    - Family †Kogaionidae
    - Suborder †Cimolodonta
      - Family †Sloanbaataridae
      - Superfamily †Ptilodontoidea
        - Family †Cimolodontidae
        - Family †Ptilodontidae
      - Superfamily †Taeniolabidoidea
        - Family †Cimolomyidae
        - Family †Eucosmodontidae
        - Family †Taeniolabididae
    - Suborder †Gondwanatheria
      - Family †Ferugliotheriidae
      - Family †Sudamericidae
- Infraclass †Triconodonta
  - Family †Austrotriconodontidae
  - Family †Amphilestidae
  - Family †Triconodontidae
- Infraclass Holotheria
  - Family †Chronoperatidae
  - Superlegion †Kuehneotheria
    - Family †Kuehneotheriidae
    - Family †Woutersiidae
  - Superlegion Trechnotheria
    - Legion †Symmetrodonta
      - Family †Shuotheriidae
      - Order †Amphidontoidea
        - Family †Amphidontidae
      - Order †Spalacotherioidea
        - Family †Tinodontidae
        - Family †Spalacotheriidae
        - Family †Barbereniidae
    - Legion Cladotheria
      - Sublegion †Dryolestoidea
        - Order †Dryolestida
          - Family †Dryolestidae
          - Family †Paurodontidae
          - Family †Donodontidae
          - Family †Mesungulatidae
          - Family †Reigitheriidae
          - Family †Brandoniidae
        - Order †Amphitheriida
          - Family †Amphitheriidae
      - Sublegion Zatheria
        - Family †Arguitheriidae
        - Family †Arguimuridae
        - Family †Vincelestidae
        - Infralegion †Peramura
          - Family †Peramuridae
        - Infralegion Tribosphenida
          - Family †Necrolestidae
          - Supercohort †Aegialodontia
            - Family †Aegialodontidae
          - Supercohort Theria: therian mammals
            - Family †Pappotheriidae
            - Family †Holoclemensiidae
            - Family †Kermackiidae
            - Family †Endotheriidae
            - Family †Picopsidae
            - Family †Potamotelsidae
            - Family †Plicatodontidae
            - Order †Deltatheroida
              - Family †Deltatheridiidae
              - Family †Deltatheroididae
            - Order †Asiadelphia
              - Family †Asiatheriidae
            - Cohort Marsupialia: marsupials
              - Family †Yingabalanaridae
              - Suborder †Archimetatheria
                - Family †Stagodontidae
                - Family †Pediomyidae
              - Magnorder Australidelphia
                - Superorder Microbiotheria
                  - Family Microbiotheriidae: monito del monte
                - Superorder Eometatheria
                  - Order †Yalkaparidontia
                    - Family †Yalkaparidontidae
                  - Order Notoryctemorphia: marsupial moles
                    - Family Notoryctidae: marsupial moles
                  - Grandorder Dasyuromorphia: marsupial carnivores
                    - Family †Thylacinidae: recently extinct Tasmanian tiger and relatives
                    - Family Dasyuridae: Tasmanian devil, quolls, numbat, etc.
                  - Grandorder Syndactyli: syndactylous marsupials
                    - Order Peramelia: bandicoots
                      - Family Peramelidae
                      - Family Peroryctidae
                    - Order Diprotodontia
                      - Family †Palorchestidae
                      - Family †Wynardiidae
                      - Family †Thylacoleonidae
                      - Family Tarsipedidae: honey possum
                      - Superfamily Vombatoidea
                        - Family †Ilariidae
                        - Family †Diprotodontidae
                        - Family Vombatidae: wombats
                      - Superfamily Phalangeroidea
                        - Family Phalangeridae: phalangers
                        - Family Burramyidae: pygmy possums
                        - Family Macropodidae: rat kangaroos, kangaroos and wallabies
                        - Family Petauridae: gliders
                        - Family †Ektopodontidae
                        - Family Phascolarctidae: koala
                        - Family †Pilkipildridae
                        - Family †Miralinidae
                        - Family Acrobatidae: feather-tail glider, pen-tailed phalanger
              - Magnorder Ameridelphia
                - Order Didelphimorphia: opossums
                  - Family Didelphidae: opossums
                  - Family †Sparassocynidae
                - Order Paucituberculata
                  - Superfamily Caenolestoidea
                    - Family †Sternbergiidae
                    - Family Caenolestidae: rat or shrew opossums
                    - Family †Paleothentidae
                    - Family †Abderitidae
                  - Superfamily †Polydolopoidea
                    - Family †Sillustaniidae
                    - Family †Polydolopidae
                    - Family †Prepidolopidae
                    - Family †Bonapartheriidae
                  - Superfamily †Argyrolagoidea
                    - Family †Argyrolagidae
                    - Family †Patagoniidae
                    - Family †Groeberiidae
                  - Superfamily †Caroloameghinioidea
                    - Family †Glasbiidae
                    - Family †Caroloameghiniidae
                - Order †Sparassodonta
                  - Family †Mayulestidae
                  - Family †Hondadelphidae
                  - Family †Borhyaenidae
            - Cohort Placentalia: placentals
              - Order †Bibymalagasia
              - Magnorder Xenarthra: edentates
                - Order Cingulata: armadillos and relatives
                  - Family †Protobradidae
                  - Superfamily Dasypodoidea
                    - Family Dasypodidae: armadillos
                    - Family †Peltephilidae
                  - Superfamily †Glyptodontoidea
                    - Family †Pampatheriidae
                    - Family †Palaeopeltidae
                    - Family †Glyptodontidae: glyptodonts
                - Order Pilosa: anteaters, sloths, and relatives
                  - Family †Entelopidae
                  - Suborder Vermilingua
                    - Family Myrmecophagidae: giant anteaters and relatives
                    - Family Cyclopedidae: pygmy anteater
                  - Suborder Phyllophaga
                    - Family †Rathymotheriidae
                    - Infraorder †Mylodonta
                      - Superfamily †Mylodontoidea
                        - Family †Scelidotheriidae
                        - Family †Mylodontidae
                      - Superfamily †Orophodontoidea
                        - Family †Orophodontidae
                    - Infraorder Megatheria
                      - Superfamily Megatherioidea
                        - Family †Megatheriidae: ground sloths
                        - Family Megalonychidae: two-toed sloths
                      - Superfamily Bradypodoidea
                        - Family Bradypodidae: three-toed sloths
              - Magnorder Epitheria: epitheres
                - Superorder †Leptictida
                  - Family †Gypsonictopidae
                  - Family †Kulbeckiidae
                  - Family †Didymoconidae
                  - Family †Leptictidae
                - Superorder Preptotheria
                  - Grandorder Anagalida
                    - Family †Zambdalestidae
                    - Family †Anagalidae
                    - Family †Pseudictopidae
                    - Mirorder Macroscelidea: elephant shrews
                      - Family Macroscelididae: elephant shrews
                    - Mirorder Duplicidentata
                      - Order †Mimotonida
                        - Family †Mimotonidae
                      - Order Lagomorpha
                        - Family Ochotonidae: pikas
                        - Family Leporidae: rabbits
                    - Mirorder Simplicidentata
                      - Order †Mixodontia
                        - Family †Eurymylidae
                      - Order Rodentia: rodents
                        - Family †Alagomyidae
                        - Family †Laredomyidae
                        - Suborder Sciuromorpha
                          - Superfamily †Ischyromyoidea
                            - Family †Ischyromyidae
                          - Superfamily Aplodontoidea
                            - Family †Allomyidae
                            - Family Aplodontiidae: mountain beaver
                            - Family †Mylagaulidae
                          - Infraorder †Theridomyomorpha
                            - Family †Theridomyidae
                          - Infraorder Sciurida
                            - Family †Reithroparamyidae
                            - Family Sciuridae: squirrels
                          - Infraorder Castorimorpha
                            - Family †Eutypomyidae
                            - Family Castoridae: beavers
                            - Family †Rhizospalacidae
                        - Suborder Myomorpha
                          - Family †Protoptychidae
                          - Infraorder Myodonta
                            - Superfamily Dipodoidea
                              - Family †Armintomyidae
                              - Family Dipodidae: jumping mice, jerboas
                            - Superfamily Muroidea
                              - Family †Simimyidae
                              - Family Muridae: rats, mice, and relatives
                          - Infraorder Glirimorpha
                            - Family Myoxidae: dormice
                          - Infraorder Geomorpha
                            - Superfamily †Eomyoidea
                              - Family †Eomyidae
                            - Superfamily Geomyoidea
                              - Family †Florentiamyidae
                              - Family Geomyidae: pocket gophers, pocket mice, and kangaroo rats
                        - Suborder Anomaluromorpha
                          - Superfamily Pedetoidea
                            - Family †Parapedetidae
                            - Family Pedetidae: springhaas
                          - Superfamily Anomaluroidea
                            - Family †Zegdoumyidae
                            - Family Anomaluridae: scaly-tailed squirrels
                        - Suborder Sciuravida
                          - Family †Ivanantoniidae
                          - Family †Sciuravidae
                          - Family †Chapattimyidae
                          - Family †Cylindrodontidae
                          - Family Ctenodactylidae: gundis
                        - Suborder Hystricognatha
                          - Family †Tsaganomyidae
                          - Infraorder Hystricognathi
                            - Family Hystricidae: Old World porcupines
                            - Family Erethizontidae: New World porcupines
                            - Family †Myophiomyidae
                            - Family †Diamantomyidae
                            - Family †Phiomyidae
                            - Family †Kenyamyidae
                            - Family Petromuridae: rock rats
                            - Family Thryonomyidae: cane rats
                            - Parvorder Bathyergomorphi
                              - Family Bathyergidae: mole-rats
                              - Family †Bathyergoididae
                            - Parvorder Caviida
                              - Superfamily Cavioidea
                                - Family Agoutidae: agoutis and pacas
                                - Family †Eocardiidae
                                - Family Dinomyidae: pacarana
                                - Family Caviidae: cavies
                                - Family Hydrochoeridae: capybara
                              - Superfamily Octodontoidea
                                - Family Octodontidae: degus, tuco-tucos
                                - Family Echimyidae: spiny rats, nutria
                                - Family Capromyidae: hutias
                                - Family †Heptaxodontidae
                              - Superfamily Chinchilloidea
                                - Family Chinchillidae: chinchillas, viscachas
                                - Family †Neoepiblemidae
                                - Family Abrocomidae: rat chinchillas
                  - Grandorder Ferae
                    - Order Cimolesta - pangolins and relatives
                      - Family †Palaeoryctidae
                      - Suborder †Didelphodonta
                        - Family †Cimolestidae
                      - Suborder †Apatotheria
                        - Family †Apatemyidae
                      - Suborder †Taeniodonta
                        - Family †Stylinodontidae
                      - Suborder †Tillodonta
                        - Family †Tillotheriidae
                      - Suborder †Pantodonta
                        - Family †Wangliidae
                        - Superfamily †Bemalambdoidea
                          - Family †Harpyodidae
                          - Family †Bemalambdidae
                        - Superfamily †Pantolambdoidea
                          - Family †Pastoralodontidae
                          - Family †Titanoideidae
                          - Family †Pantolambdidae
                          - Family †Barylambdidae
                          - Family †Cyriacotheriidae
                          - Family †Pantolambdodontidae
                        - Superfamily †Coryphodontoidea
                          - Family †Coryphodontidae
                      - Suborder †Pantolesta
                        - Family †Pantolestidae
                        - Family †Paroxyclaenidae
                        - Family †Ptolemaiidae
                      - Suborder Pholidota
                        - Family †Epoicotheriidae
                        - Family †Metacheiromyidae
                        - Family Manidae: pangolins
                      - Suborder †Ernanodonta
                        - Family †Ernanodontidae
                    - Order †Creodonta: creodonts
                      - Family †Hyaenodontidae
                      - Family †Oxyaenidae
                    - Order Carnivora
                      - Suborder Feliformia
                        - Family †Viverravidae
                        - Family †Nimravidae
                        - Family Felidae: cats
                        - Family Viverridae: civets, Asiatic palm civets
                        - Family Herpestidae: mongooses
                        - Family Hyaenidae: hyaenas, aardwolf
                        - Family Nandiniidae: African palm civets
                      - Suborder Caniformia
                        - Family †Miacidae
                        - Infraorder Cynoidea
                          - Family Canidae: dogs
                        - Infraorder Arctoidea
                          - Parvorder Ursida
                            - Superfamily †Amphicyonoidea
                              - Family †Amphicyonidae
                            - Superfamily Ursoidea
                              - Family Ursidae: bears
                              - Family †Hemicyonidae
                            - Superfamily Phocoidea
                              - Family Otariidae: eared seals
                              - Family Phocidae: seals, walrus
                          - Parvorder Mustelida
                            - Family Mustelidae: weasels, skunks, and relatives
                            - Family Procyonidae: ringtails, olingos, kinkajou, raccoons, coatis, red panda
                  - Grandorder Lipotyphla
                    - Family †Adapisoriculidae
                    - Order Chrysochloridea
                      - Family Chrysochloridae: golden moles
                    - Order Erinaceomorpha
                      - Family †Sespedectidae
                      - Family †Amphilemuridae
                      - Family †Adapisoricidae
                      - Family †Creotarsidae
                      - Superfamily Erinaceoidea
                        - Family Erinaceidae: hedgehogs and relatives
                      - Superfamily Talpoidea
                        - Family †Proscalopidae
                        - Family Talpidae: moles
                        - Family †Dimylidae
                    - Order Soricomorpha
                      - Family †Otlestidae
                      - Family †Geolabididae
                      - Superfamily Soricoidea
                        - Family †Nesophontidae: recently extinct west Indian shrews
                        - Family †Micropternodontidae
                        - Family †Apternodontidae
                        - Family Solenodontidae: solenodons
                        - Family †Plesiosoricidae
                        - Family †Nyctitheriidae
                        - Family Soricidae: shrews
                      - Superfamily Tenrecoidea
                        - Family Tenrecidae: tenrecs
                  - Grandorder Archonta
                    - Order Chiroptera: bats
                      - Suborder Megachiroptera
                        - Family Pteropodidae: flying foxes
                      - Suborder Microchiroptera
                        - Family †Archaeonycteridae
                        - Family †Paleochiropterygidae
                        - Family †Hassianycterididae
                        - Family Emballonuridae: sac-winged bats
                        - Infraorder Yinochiroptera
                          - Superfamily Rhinopomatoidea
                            - Family Rhinopomatidae: mouse-tailed bats
                            - Family Craseonycteridae: bumblebee bats
                          - Superfamily Rhinolophoidea
                            - Family Megadermatidae: false vampire bats
                            - Family Nycteridae: hispid bats
                            - Family Rhinolophidae: horseshoe and Old World leaf-nosed bats
                        - Infraorder Yangochiroptera
                          - Family Mystacinidae: New Zealand short-tailed bats
                          - Superfamily Noctilionoidea
                            - Family Noctilionidae: fishing bats
                            - Family Mormoopidae: spectacled bats
                            - Family Phyllostomidae: New World leaf-nosed and vampire bats
                          - Superfamily Vespertilionoidea
                            - Family †Philisidae
                            - Family Molossidae: free-tailed bats
                            - Family Natalidae: funnel-eared bats
                            - Family Furipteridae: smoky bats
                            - Family Thyropteridae: New World sucker-footed bats
                            - Family Myzopodidae: Old World sucker-footed bats
                            - Family Vespertilionidae: common bats
                    - Order Primates: primates
                      - Family †Purgatoriidae
                      - Family †Microsyopidae
                      - Family †Micromomyidae
                      - Family †Picromomyidae
                      - Family †Plesiadapidae
                      - Family †Palaechthonidae
                      - Family †Picrodontidae
                      - Suborder Dermoptera
                        - Family †Paromomyidae
                        - Family †Plagiomenidae
                        - Family †Mixodectidae
                        - Family Galeopithecidae: colugos
                      - Suborder Euprimates
                        - Infraorder Strepsirrhini
                          - Family †Plesiopithecidae
                          - Superfamily Daubentonioidea
                            - Family Daubentoniidae: aye-aye
                          - Superfamily Lemuroidea
                            - Family †Adapidae
                            - Family Lemuridae: lemurs
                          - Superfamily Loroidea
                            - Family Lorisidae: lorises and galagos
                            - Family Cheirogaleidae: dwarf lemurs
                          - Superfamily Indroidea
                            - Family †Archaeolemuridae
                            - Family †Palaeopropithecidae
                            - Family Indriidae: indris and sifakas
                        - Infraorder Haplorhini
                          - Parvorder Tarsiiformes
                            - Superfamily †Carpolestoidea
                              - Family †Carpolestidae
                            - Superfamily Tarsioidea
                              - Family †Omomyidae
                              - Family †Microchoeridae
                              - Family †Afrotarsiidae
                              - Family Tarsiidae: tarsiers
                          - Parvorder Anthropoidea
                            - Family †Eosimiidae
                            - Family †Parapithecidae
                            - Superfamily Cercopithecoidea
                              - Family †Pliopithecidae
                              - Family Cercopithecidae: Old World monkeys including colobuses
                              - Family Hominidae: humans, greater apes, lesser apes
                            - Superfamily Callitrichoidea [=Ceboidea of other authors]
                              - Family Callitrichidae: marmosets
                              - Family Atelidae [=Cebidae of other authors]: New World monkeys
                    - Order Scandentia
                      - Family Tupaiidae: tree shrews
                  - Grandorder Ungulata: ungulates
                    - Order Tubulidentata
                      - Family Orycteropodidae: aardvark
                    - Order †Dinocerata
                      - Family †Uintatheriidae
                    - Mirorder Eparctocyona
                      - Order †Procreodi
                        - Family †Oxyclaenidae
                        - Family †Arctocyonidae
                      - Order †Condylarthra
                        - Family †Hyopsodontidae
                        - Family †Mioclaenidae
                        - Family †Phenacodontidae
                        - Family †Periptychidae
                        - Family †Peligrotheriidae
                        - Family †Didolodontidae
                      - Order †Arctostylopida
                        - Family †Arctostylopidae
                      - Order Cete: whales and relatives
                        - Suborder †Acreodi
                          - Family †Triisodontidae
                          - Family †Mesonychidae: mesonychids
                          - Family †Hapalodectidae
                        - Suborder Cetacea
                          - Infraorder †Archaeoceti
                            - Family †Basilosauridae
                            - Family †Protocetidae
                            - Family †Remingtonocetidae
                          - Infraorder Autoceta
                            - Family †Agorophiidae
                            - Superfamily †Squalodontoidea
                              - Family †Squalodontidae
                              - Family †Rhabdosteidae
                            - Parvorder Mysticeti
                              - Family †Aetiocetidae
                              - Family †Mammalodontidae
                              - Family †Cetotheriidae
                              - Family Balaenopteridae: rorquals and grey whales
                              - Family Balaenidae: right and bowhead whales
                            - Parvorder Odontoceti
                              - Superfamily Physeteroidea
                                - Family Physeteridae: sperm whales
                              - Superfamily Hyperoodontoidea
                                - Family Hyperoodontidae: beaked whales
                              - Superfamily Platanistoidea
                                - Family Platanistidae: river dolphins
                              - Superfamily Delphinoidea
                                - Family Delphinidae: dolphins
                                - Family Pontoporiidae: La Plata River dolphin
                                - Family Lipotidae: baiiji
                                - Family Iniidae: Amazon River dolphin
                                - Family †Kentridontidae
                                - Family Monodontidae: beluga and narwhal
                                - Family †Odobenocetopsidae
                                - Family †Dalpiazinidae
                                - Family †Acrodelphinidae
                                - Family Phocoenidae: porpoises
                                - Family †Albireonidae
                                - Family †Hemisyntrachelidae
                      - Order Artiodactyla: even-toed ungulates
                        - Suborder Suiformes
                          - Family †Raoellidae
                          - Family †Choeropotamidae
                          - Superfamily Suoidea
                            - Family Suidae: pigs
                            - Family Tayassuidae: peccaries
                            - Family †Santheriidae
                            - Family Hippopotamidae: hippos
                          - Superfamily †Dichobunoidea
                            - Family †Dichobunidae
                            - Family †Cebochoeridae
                            - Family †Mixtotheriidae
                                - Family †Helohyidae
                          - Superfamily †Anthracotherioidea
                            - Family †Haplobunodontidae
                            - Family †Anthracotheriidae
                          - Superfamily †Anoplotherioidea
                            - Family †Dacrytheriidae
                            - Family †Anoplotheriidae
                            - Family †Cainotheriidae
                          - Superfamily †Oreodontoidea
                            - Family †Agriochoeridae
                            - Family †Oreodontidae
                          - Superfamily †Entelodontoidea
                            - Family †Entelodontidae
                        - Suborder Tylopoda
                          - Family †Xiphodontidae
                          - Superfamily Cameloidea
                            - Family Camelidae: camels and llamas
                            - Family †Oromerycidae
                          - Superfamily †Protoceratoidea
                            - Family †Protoceratidae
                        - Suborder Ruminantia
                          - Family †Amphimerycidae
                          - Family †Hypertragulidae
                          - Family Tragulidae: mouse deer
                          - Family †Leptomerycidae
                          - Family †Bachitheriidae
                          - Family †Lophiomerycidae
                          - Family †Gelocidae
                          - Superfamily Cervoidea
                            - Family Moschidae: musk deer
                            - Family Antilocapridae: pronghorn
                            - Family †Palaeomerycidae
                            - Family †Hoplitomerycidae
                            - Family Cervidae: deer
                          - Superfamily Giraffoidea
                            - Family †Climacoceratidae
                            - Family Giraffidae: giraffe and okapi
                          - Superfamily Bovoidea
                            - Family Bovidae: cattle, antelope, and relatives
                    - Mirorder †Meridiungulata
                      - Family †Perutheriidae
                      - Family †Amilnedwardsiidae
                      - Order †Litopterna
                        - Family †Protolipternidae
                        - Superfamily †Macrauchenioidea
                          - Family †Macraucheniidae
                          - Family †Notonychopidae
                          - Family †Adianthidae
                        - Superfamily †Proterotherioidea
                          - Family †Proterotheriidae
                      - Order †Notoungulata: notoungulates
                        - Suborder †Notioprogonia
                          - Family †Henricosborniidae
                          - Family †Notostylopidae
                        - Suborder †Toxodontia
                          - Family †Isotemnidae
                          - Family †Leontiniidae
                          - Family †Notohippidae
                          - Family †Toxodontidae
                          - Family †Homalodotheriidae
                        - Suborder †Typotheria
                          - Family †Archaeopithecidae
                          - Family †Oldfieldthomasiidae
                          - Family †Interatheriidae
                          - Family †Campanorcidae
                          - Family †Mesotheriidae
                        - Suborder †Hegetotheria
                          - Family †Archaeohyracidae
                          - Family †Hegetotheriidae
                      - Order †Astrapotheria
                        - Family †Eoastrapostylopidae
                        - Family †Trigonostylopidae
                        - Family †Astrapotheriidae
                      - Order †Xenungulata
                        - Family †Carodniidae
                      - Order †Pyrotheria
                        - Family †Pyrotheriidae
                    - Mirorder Altungulata
                      - Order Perissodactyla: odd-toed ungulates
                        - Suborder Hippomorpha
                          - Family Equidae: horses
                          - Family †Palaeotheriidae
                        - Suborder Ceratomorpha
                          - Infraorder †Selenida
                            - Superfamily †Brontotherioidea
                              - Family †Brontotheriidae
                              - Family †Anchilophidae
                            - Superfamily †Chalicotherioidea
                              - Family †Eomoropidae
                              - Family †Chalicotheriidae
                          - Infraorder Tapiromorpha
                            - Superfamily Rhinocerotoidea
                              - Family †Hyracodontidae
                              - Family Rhinocerotidae: rhinoceroses
                            - Superfamily Tapiroidea
                              - Family †Helaletidae
                              - Family †Isectolophidae
                              - Family †Lophiodontidae
                              - Family †Deperetellidae
                              - Family †Lophialetidae
                              - Family Tapiridae: tapirs
                      - Order Uranotheria: elephants, manatees, hyraxes, and relatives
                        - Suborder Hyracoidea
                            - Family †Pliohyracidae
                            - Family Procaviidae: hyraxes
                        - Suborder †Embrithopoda
                          - Family †Phenacolophidae
                          - Family †Arsinoitheriidae
                        - Suborder Tethytheria
                          - Infraorder Sirenia: manatees, dugong, and sea cow
                            - Family †Prorastomidae
                            - Family Dugongidae: dugongs
                            - Family Trichechidae: manatees
                          - Infraorder Behemota
                            - Parvorder †Desmostylia
                              - Family †Desmostylidae
                            - Parvorder Proboscidea
                              - Family †Anthracobunidae
                              - Family †Moeritheriidae
                              - Family †Numidotheriidae
                              - Family †Barytheriidae
                              - Family †Deinotheriidae
                              - Family †Palaeomastodontidae
                              - Family †Phiomiidae
                              - Family †Hemimastodontidae
                              - Superfamily ‡Mammutoidea
                                - Family †Mammutidae: mastodons and relatives
                              - Superfamily Elephantoidea
                                - Family †Gomphotheriidae: gomphotheres
                                - Family Elephantidae: modern elephants

== Luo, Kielan-Jaworowska, and Cifelli classification ==
Several important fossil mammal discoveries have been made that have led researchers to question many of the relationships proposed by McKenna et al. (1997). Additionally, researchers are subjecting taxonomic hypotheses to more rigorous cladistic analyses of early mammal fossils. Luo et al. (2002) summarized existing ideas and proposed new ideas of relationships among mammals at the most basal level. They argued that the term mammal should be defined based on characters (especially the dentary-squamosal jaw articulation) instead of a crown-based definition (the group that contains most recent common ancestor of monotremes and therians and all of its descendants). Their definition of Mammalia is roughly equal to the Mammaliaformes as defined by McKenna et al. and other authors. They also define their taxonomic levels as clades and do not apply Linnean hierarchies.

Mammalia

- †Sinoconodon - earliest and most basal of mammals
- Unnamed clade 1 - a clade that contains all other mammals. These are characterized by determinant growth and occlusal features of the cheek teeth.
  - †Morganucodontidae - morganucodontids, including †Morganucodon, †Megazostrodon, and others
  - †Docodonta - docodonts, including †Haldanodon and †Castorocauda (Ji et al., 2006)
  - Unnamed clade 2 - a clade containing all living mammals and some fossil relatives. It is characterized by the loss of a postdentary trough and a widened braincase.
    - †Hadrocodium
    - †Kuehneotherium
    - Crown-group Mammalia - the group that contains most recent common ancestor of monotremes and therians and all of its descendants. This group is defined by additional characters relating the occlusion of molars and the presence of a well-developed masseteric fossa.
      - Australosphenida - a clade that contains monotremes and their fossil relatives. These fossils include †Ambondro, †Asfaltomylos, †Ausktribosphenos, and †Bishops. If correct, this clade represents an independent evolution of the tribosphenic molar in southern continents.
      - Trechnotheria - Therians, spalacotheriids and their relatives. They are characterized by features of the scapula, tibia, and humerus.
        - †Spalacotheriidae - including Akidolestes, Zhangheotherium, and Maotherium.
        - Cladotheria - Therians, dryolestids, and their relatives. They are characterized by features of the tribosphenic molar and the angular process of the dentary.
          - †Dryolestidae
          - †Amphitherium - incertae sedis (it may be a prototribosphenidan)
          - Prototribosphenida - Therians and fossil relatives including †Vincelestes. Characterized by features of the cochlea including coiling.
            - †Vincelestes
            - Zatheria - Therians and fossil relatives including the "peramurids". Characterized by the presence of wear in the talonid of the lower molars.
              - †"Peramuridae" - †Peramus and relatives. Known only from preserved mandibles and distinctly zatherian molars.
              - Boreosphenida - Therians and fossil relatives including †Kielantherium. They are characterized by molar features.
                - †Kielantherium
                - †Deltatheroida including †Deltatheridium - incertae sedis (it may represent a metatherian)
                - Crown-group Theria - the group that contains most recent common ancestor of marsupials and placentals and all of its descendants. Characterized by a host of molar features, aspects of the alispenoid, and aspects of the astragalus region.
      - †Eutriconodonta - incertae sedis. Triconodonts appear to be a member of the crown-Mammalia clade, but their relationships within it are unknown. It is also not certain that they represent a monophyletic group. Examples include Repenomamus.
    - †Multituberculata - incertae sedis. Luo et al. (2002) argue that multituberculates cannot be confidently placed in a particular clade of mammals. They suggest that they represent either basal mammals or are sister to the Trechnotheria.

== Simplified classification for non-specialists ==
The following classification is a simplified version based on current understanding suitable for non-specialists who want to understand how living genera are related to each other. It appears to be based on the classification of McKenna et al. and the revisions proposed by Luo et al., after extinct groups have been removed. The classification ignores differences in levels and thus cannot be used to estimate the respective distances between taxa. English names are preferred whenever they exist. This makes it especially suited for non-specialists who wish to gain an easy overview. For the full picture, the non-simplified versions above should be consulted (see McKenna/Bell classification and Luo, Kielan-Jaworowska, and Cifelli classification).

- Monotremes (prototheria): echidnas and platypus
  - Platypus (ornithorhynchids)
  - Echidnas (tachyglossids)
- Live-bearing mammals (theria)
  - Marsupials
    - Opossums (didelphids)
    - Shrew opossums (caenolestids)
    - Australodelphia: Australian marsupials and monito del Monte
      - Monito del Monte
      - Dasyuromorphs
        - Dasyurids: antechinuses, quolls, dunnarts, Tasmanian devil, and allies
        - Numbat
      - Peramelemorphs: bilbies and bandicoots
        - Bilbies (thylacomyids)
        - Bandicoots (peramelids)
      - Marsupial moles (notoryctids)
      - Diprotodonts
        - Koala
        - Wombats (vombatids)
        - Phalangerids: brushtail possums and cuscuses
        - Pygmy possums (burramyids)
        - Honey possum
        - Petaurids: striped and Leadbeater's possums, and yellow-bellied, suger, mahogany and squirrel glider
        - Ringtailed possums (pseudocheirids)
        - Potorids: potoroos, rat kangaroos and bettongs
        - Acrobatids: feathertail glider and feather-tailed possum
        - Musky rat-kangaroo
        - Macropods: kangaroos, wallabies and allies
  - Placentals
    - Atlantic placentals (atlantogenatans)
      - Afroplacentals (afrotherians)
        - Afroinsectiphilians: elephant shrews, tenrecs, otter shrews, golden moles, and aardvark
          - Elephant shrews (macroscelidids)
          - Afrosoricids: tenrecs and golden moles
            - Tenrecids: tenrecs and otter shrews
            - Golden moles (chrysochlorids)
          - Aardvark
        - Paenungulates: hyraxes, elephants, dugongs and manatees
          - Hyraxes or dassies (procaviids)
          - Elephants (elephantids)
          - Sirenians: dugong and manatees
            - Dugong
            - Manatees (trichechids)
      - Xenarthrans
        - Pilosans: sloths and anteaters
          - Anteaters (vermilinguans)
            - Silky anteater
            - Myrmecophagids: giant anteater and tamanduas
          - Sloths (folivorans)
            - Three-toed sloths (bradypodids)
            - Two-toed sloths (megalonychids)
        - Armadillos (dasypodids)
    - Northern placentals (boreoeutherians)
      - Supraprimates (euarchontoglires)
        - Euarchontans: treeshrews, colugos and primates
          - Treeshrews (scandentians)
            - Tupaiids: all treeshrews except pen-tailed
            - Pen-tailed treeshrew
          - Colugos or flying lemurs (cynocephalids)
          - Primates
            - Strepsirrhines: lemur- and loris-like primates
              - Lemur-like primates (lemuriforms)
                - Cheirogaleids: dwarf lemurs and mouse-lemurs
                - Aye-aye
                - True lemurs (lemurids)
                - Sportive lemurs (lepilemurids)
                - Indriids: woolly lemurs and allies
              - Loris-like primates (lorisiforms)
                - Lorisids: lorises, pottos and allies
                - Galagos (galagids)
            - Haplorhines: tarsiers, monkeys and apes
              - Tarsiers (tarsiids)
              - Anthropoid primates
                - New World monkeys (platyrrhines)
                  - Callitrichids: marmosets and tamarins
                  - Cebids: capuchins and squirrel monkeys
                  - Aotids: night or owl monkeys
                  - Pitheciids: titis, sakis and uakaris
                  - Atelids: howler, spider, woolly spider, and woolly monkeys
                - Catarrhines
                  - Old World monkeys (cercopithecids)
                  - Hominoid primates
                    - Gibbons (hylobatids)
                    - Great apes (hominids): incl. Humans
        - Glires: pikas, rabbits, hares, and rodents
          - Lagomorphs: pikas, rabbits and hares
            - Leporids: rabbits and hares
            - Pikas (ochotonids)
          - Rodents
            - Anomalure-like rodents (anomaluromorphs): Scaly-tailed squirrels and springhares
              - Scaly-tailed squirrels or anomalures (anomalurids)
              - Springhares (pedetids)
            - Beaver-like rodents (castorimorphs)
              - Beavers (castorids)
              - Gopher-like rodents (geomyoid rodents)
                - Pocket or true gophers (geomyids)
                - Heteromyids: kangaroo rats and kangaroo mice
            - Porcupine-like rodents (hystricomorphs)
              - Laotian rock rat
              - Gundis (ctenodactylids)
              - Hystricognaths
                - African mole rats (bathyergids)
                - Old World porcupines (hystricids)
                - Dassie rat
                - Cane rats (thryonomyids)
                - Cavy-like rodents (caviomorphs)
                  - Chinchilla rats (abrocomids)
                  - Hutias (capromyids)
                  - Cavies (caviids): incl. Guinea pigs and capybara
                  - Chinchillids: chinchillas and viscachas
                  - Tuco-tucos (ctenomyids)
                  - Agoutis (dasyproctids)
                  - Pacas (cuniculids)
                  - Pacarana
                  - Spiny rats (echymyids)
                  - New World porcupines (erethizontids)
                  - Myocastorids: nutria and coypu
                  - Octodonts (octodontids): Andean rock-rats, degus and viscacha-rats
            - Mouse-like rodents (myomorphs)
              - Dipodids: jerboas and jumping mice
              - Muroid rodents
                - Mouse-like hamsters (calomyscids)
                - Cricetids: hamsters, New World rats and mice, voles
                - Murids: true mice and rats, gerbils, spiny mice, crested rat
                - Nesomyids: climbing mice, rock mice, white-tailed rat, Malagasy rats and mice
                - Spiny dormice (platacanthomyids)
                - Spalacids: mole rats, bamboo rats, and zokors
            - Squirrel-like rodents (sciuromorphs)
              - Mountain beaver
              - Dormice (glirids)
              - Squirrels (sciurids): incl. chipmunks, prairie dogs, and marmots
      - Laurasian placentals (laurasiatherians)
        - Eulipotyphlans: hedgehogs, moles, shrews, solenodons
          - Hedgehogs (erinaceids)
          - Shrews (soricids)
          - Moles (talpids)
          - Solenodons (solenodontids)
        - Ferungulates: ungulates, cetaceans, bats, pangolins and carnivorans
          - Cetartiodactyls: even-toed ungulates and cetaceans
            - Camelids: camels and llamas
            - Swine (suinans): pigs and peccaries
              - Pigs (suids)
              - Peccaries (tayassuids)
            - Cetruminantians: cetaceans, hippos and ruminants
              - Cetancodonts: cetaceans and hippos
                - Cetaceans: Whales, dolphins and porpoises
                  - Baleen whales (mysticetes)
                    - Balaenids: right whales and bowhead whale
                    - Rorquals (balaenopterids)
                    - Gray whale
                    - Pygmy right whale
                  - Toothed whales (odontocetes)
                    - Dolphins (delphinids)
                    - Monodontids: beluga and narwhal
                      - Beluga
                      - Narwhal
                    - Porpoises (phocoenids)
                    - Sperm whale
                    - Kogiids: pygmy and dwarf sperm whale
                    - River dolphins (platanistoid whales)
                      - Iniids: Amazon and Bolivian river dolphin
                      - La Plata dolphin
                      - Platanistids: Ganges and Indus river dolphins
                    - Beaked whales (ziphids)
                - Hippos (hippopotamids)
              - Ruminantiamorphs: chevrotains, pronghorn, giraffes, musk deer, deer, and bovids
                - Chevrotains (tragulids)
                - Pecorans
                  - Pronghorn
                  - Giraffids: giraffe and okapi
                  - Musk deer (moschids)
                  - Deer (cervids)
                  - Bovids: cattle, goats, sheep and antelope
          - Pegasoferans: bats, odd-toed ungulates, pangolins and carnivorans
            - Bats (chiropterans)
              - Megabats (pteropodids)
              - Microbats (microchiropterans)
                - Sac-winged or sheath-tailed bats (emballonurids)
                - Rhinopomatoid bats
                  - Mouse-tailed bats (rhinopomatids)
                  - Bumblebee bat or Kitti's hog-nosed bat
                - Rhinolophoid bats
                  - Horseshoe bats (rhinolophids)
                  - Hollow-faced or slit-faced bats (nycterids)
                  - False vampires (megadermatids)
                - Vesper bats or evening bats (vespertilionids)
                - Molossoid bats
                  - Free-tailed bats (molossids)
                  - Pallid bats (antrozoids)
                - Nataloid bats
                  - Funnel-eared bats (natalids)
                  - Sucker-footed bats (myzopodids)
                  - Disc-winged bats (thyropterids)
                  - Smoky bats (furipterids)
                - Noctilionoid bats
                  - Bulldog or fisherman bats (noctilionids)
                  - New Zealand short-tailed bats (mystacinids)
                  - Ghost-faced or moustached bats (mormoopids)
                  - Leaf-nosed bats (phyllostomids)
            - Zooamatans: odd-toed ungulates, pangolins and carnivorans
              - Odd-toed ungulates (perissodactyls)
                - Horses (equids)
                - Ceratomorphs
                  - Tapirs (tapirids)
                  - Rhinoceroses (rhinocerotids)
              - Ferans
                - Pangolins or scaly anteaters (manids)
                - Carnivorans
                  - Cat-like carnivorans (feliforms)
                    - African palm civet
                    - Feloid carnivorans
                      - Asiatic linsangs (prionodontids)
                      - Cats (felids)
                    - Viverroid carnivorans
                      - Viverrids: civets and allies
                      - Herpestoid carnivorans
                        - Hyaenids: hyenas and aardwolf
                        - Malagasy carnivorans (euplerids)
                        - Herpestids: mongooses and allies
                  - Dog-like carnivorans (caniforms)
                    - Canids: dogs and allies
                    - Arctoid carnivorans
                      - Bears (ursids)
                      - Musteloid carnivorans
                        - Red panda
                        - Mephitids: skunks and stink badgers
                        - Mustelids: weasels, martens, badgers, wolverines, minks, ferrets and otters
                        - Procyonids: raccoons and allies
                      - Pinnipeds
                        - Walrus
                        - Otariids: sea lions, eared seals, fur seals
                        - True seals (phocids)

== See also ==
- Animal
- List of mammals
- List of prehistoric mammals
- Mammal
