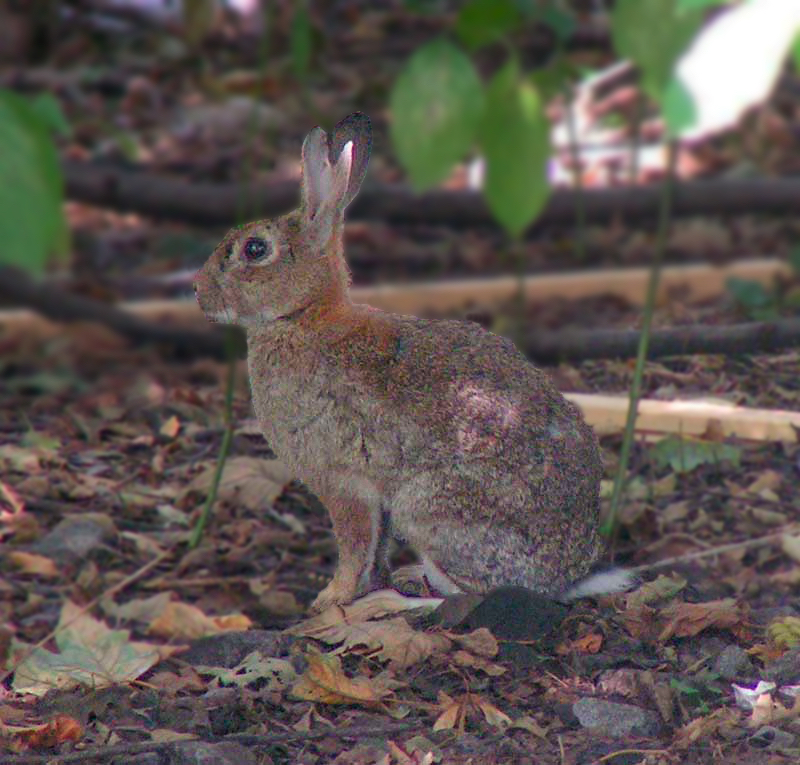
- European rabbit

Scientific classification
- Kingdom: Animalia
- Phylum: Chordata
- Class: Mammalia
- Clade: Epitheria
- Magnorder: Preptotheria; McKenna, 1975

= Preptotheria =

Superorder of mammals

Preptotheria is a superorder of placental mammals proposed by McKenna & Bell in their classification of mammals.

== Classification ==
The Linnean taxonomy of Preptotheria according to the scheme of McKenna & Bell (1997):

=== Cohort Placentalia ===
==== Magnorder Xenarthra ====
- Order Cingulata
- Order Pilosa: Sloths and anteaters

==== Magnorder Epitheria ====
- Superorder †Leptictida
- Superorder Preptotheria
  - Grandorder Anagalida
    - Mirorder Macroscelidea
    - Mirorder Duplicidentata
      - Order †Mimotonida
      - Order Lagomorpha
    - Mirorder Simplicidentata
      - Order †Mixodontia
      - Order Rodentia
  - Grandorder Ferae
    - Order Cimolesta (including Pholidota)
    - Order †Creodonta
    - Order Carnivora
  - Grandorder Lipotyphla
    - Order Chrysochloridea
    - Order Erinaceomorpha
    - Order Soricomorpha
  - Grandorder Archonta
    - Order Chiroptera
    - Order Primates (including Dermoptera as family Galeopithecidae)
    - Order Scandentia
  - Grandorder Ungulata
    - Order Tubulidentata
    - Order †Dinocerata
    - Mirorder Eparctocyona
      - Order †Procreodi
      - Order †Condylarthra
      - Order †Arctostylopida
      - Order Cete
      - Order Artiodactyla
    - Mirorder †Meridiungulata
      - Order †Litopterna
      - Order †Notoungulata
      - Order †Astrapotheria
      - Order †Xenungulata
      - Order †Pyrotheria
    - Mirorder Altungulata
      - Order Perissodactyla
      - Order Uranotheria or Paenungulata
