= Anictops =

Anictops Temporal range: Early to late Paleocene, 66.043–58.7 Ma

Scientific classification
- Domain: Eukaryota
- Kingdom: Animalia
- Phylum: Chordata
- Class: Mammalia
- Order: †Anagaloidea
- Family: †Pseudictopidae
- Genus: †Anictops; Qiu, 1977

Species
- A. tabiepedis Qiu, 1977(type); A. wanghudunensis Zheng et al. 1999

Extinct genus of mammals

Anictops is an extinct genus of Anagalida that lived during Early to Late Paleocene. This type of species is A. tabiepedis whose fossils are well-preserved at Palaeozoological Museum of China.
