= Anagale =

Anagale Temporal range: Early Oligocene
- Restoration of A. gobiensis

Scientific classification
- Kingdom: Animalia
- Phylum: Chordata
- Class: Mammalia
- Order: †Anagaloidea
- Family: †Anagalidae
- Genus: †Anagale; Simpson, 1931
- Species: †A. gobiensis

Binomial name
- †Anagale gobiensis Simpson, 1931

Genus of mammals (fossil)

Anagale is an extinct genus of mammal from the Early Oligocene of Mongolia. Its closest living relatives are the rodents and lagomorphs.

== Description ==
Anagale was 30 cm (1 ft) long and resembled a rabbit, but with a longer tail. Anagale gobiensis had the lowest neocortical ratio ever recorded in a euarchontogliran. Along with its small neocortex, it also possessed small petrosal lobules; both of these traits are typically associated with fossorial mammals. Its laterally expansive palaeocortex and relatively large olfactory bulbs suggest that olfaction was its primary sense.

== Palaeobiology ==
The build of the hind legs of Anagale indicates that it walked, and did not hop. Judging from its shovel-shaped claws, Anagale burrowed for food, such as subterranean beetles and worms. Anagale fossils have strongly worn teeth from eating soil, further indicating it ate subterranean invertebrates.
