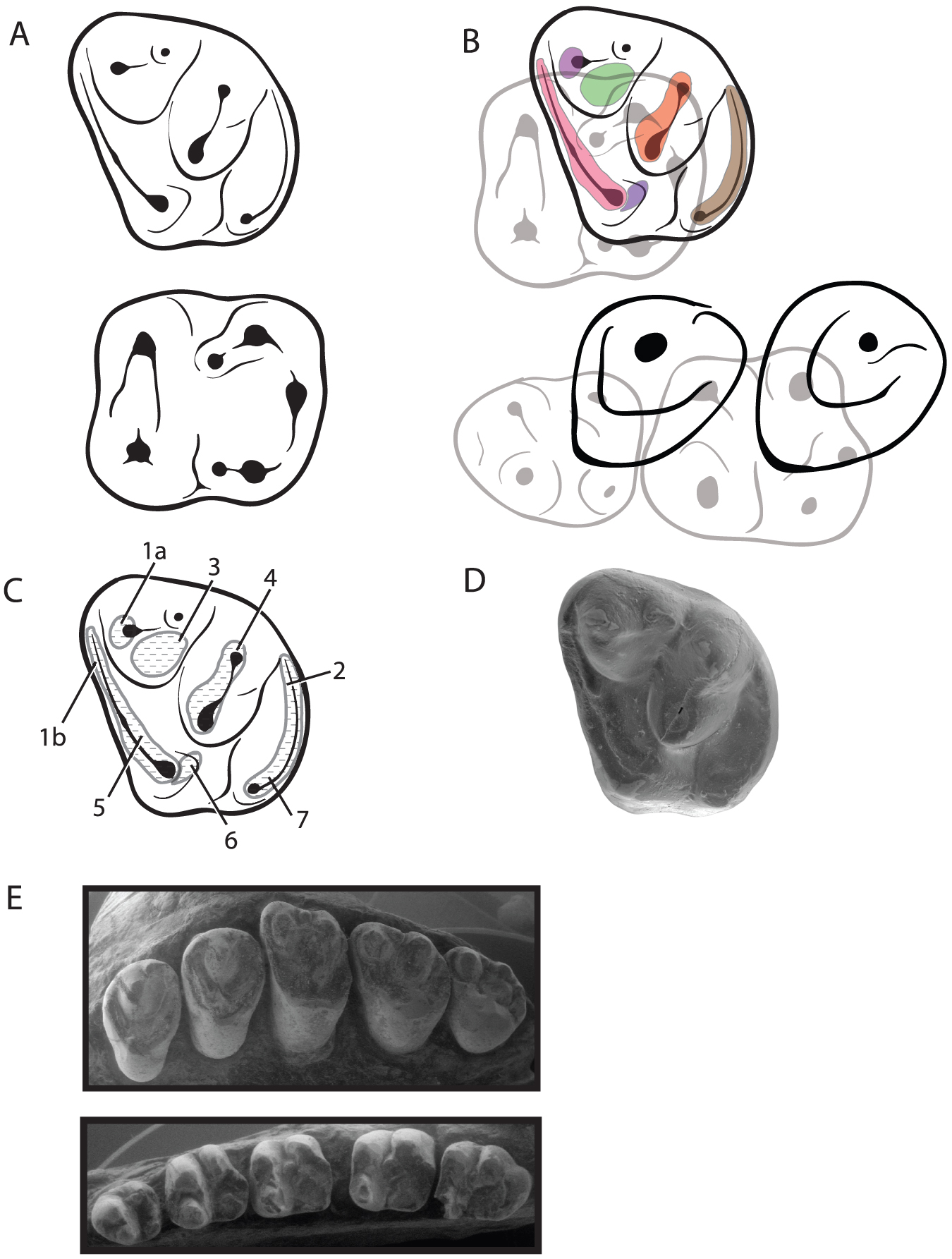
- Drawings and SEM images of cheek teeth of Gomphos elkema

Scientific classification
- Kingdom: Animalia
- Phylum: Chordata
- Class: Mammalia
- Infraclass: Placentalia
- Grandorder: Glires
- Genus: †Gomphos; Shevyreva, 1975

Species
- G. elkema Shevyreva 1975; G. shevyrevae Meng et al 2009

= Gomphos =

Gomphos Temporal range: Early Eocene

Extinct genus of mammals

Gomphos is an extinct genus of early lagomorphs from the early Eocene of China and Mongolia.

Gomphos was first named in 1975 from material found in the Gashato Formation. There are currently two species in this genus: G. elkema, from the Greek word γόμφος (Romanized gomphos), which means "peg", but can also be used to signify molar teeth; and G. shevyrevae was named later in honour of the lead author who named the first original genus and species of Gomphos elkema.

Analysis supports Gomphos as one of the earliest lagomorphs, the group that includes rabbits, hares and pikas. It is likely that lagomorphs split off from the rest of the placental mammals around the Cretaceous-Palaeogene boundary.

== Sources ==
- The Beginning of the Age of Mammals by Kenneth D. Rose
- The Rise of Placental Mammals: Origins and Relationships of the Major Extant Clades by Kenneth D. Rose and J. David Archibald
