= Legion (taxonomy) =

Taxonomic rank

The hierarchy of biological classification's eight major taxonomic ranks. Intermediate minor rankings are not shown.

The legion is a non-obligatory taxonomic rank within the Linnaean hierarchy sometimes used in zoology.

== Taxonomic rank ==
In zoological taxonomy, the legion is:

1. subordinate to the class
2. superordinate to the cohort.
3. consists of a group of related orders

Legions may be grouped into superlegions or subdivided into sublegions, and these again into infralegions.

== Use in zoology ==
Legions and their super/sub/infra groups have been employed in some classifications of birds and mammals. Full use is made of all of these (along with cohorts and supercohorts) in, for example, McKenna and Bell's classification of mammals.

== See also ==
- Linnaean taxonomy
- Mammal classification
