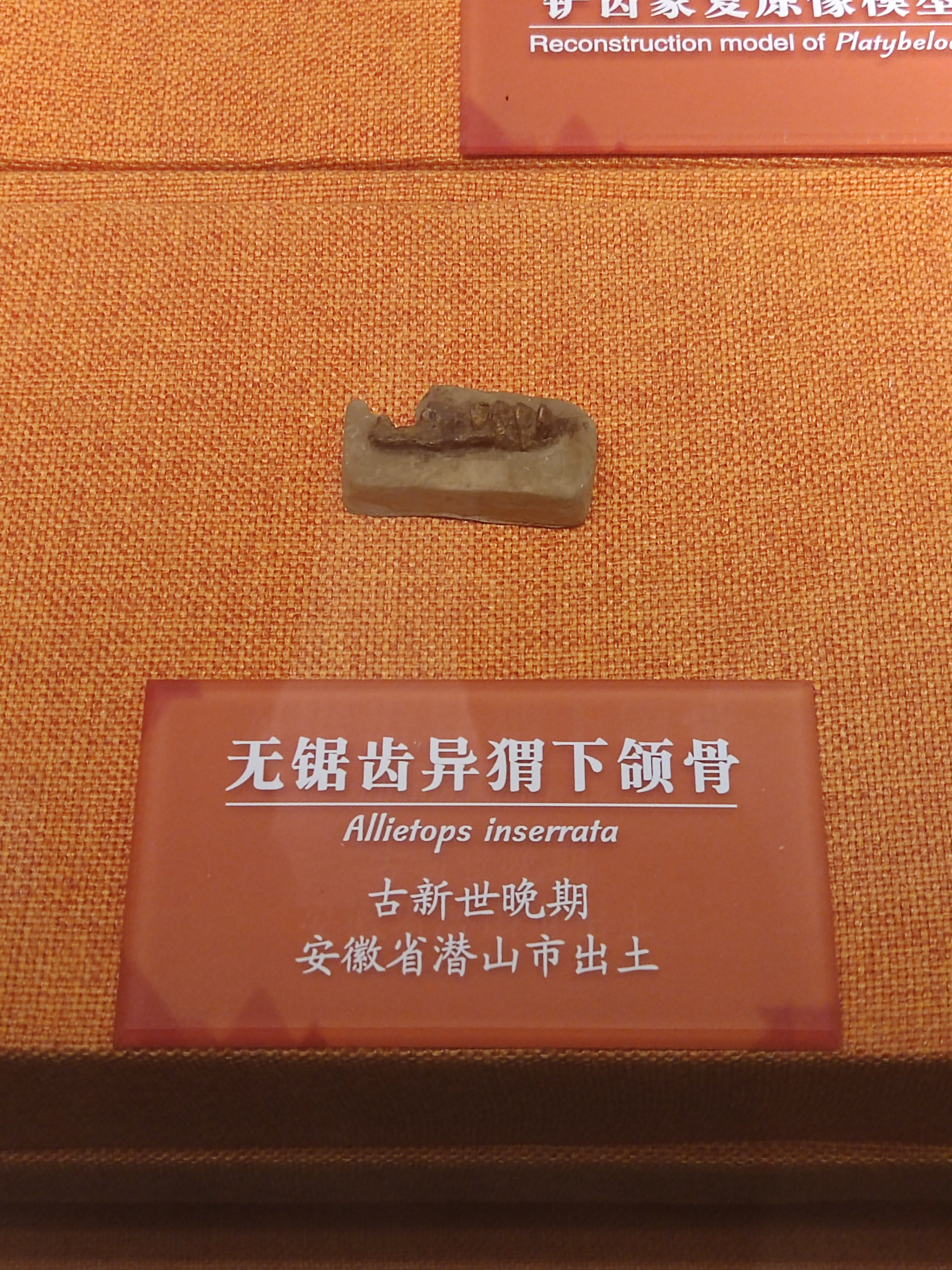

Scientific classification
- Kingdom: Animalia
- Phylum: Chordata
- Class: Mammalia
- Order: †Anagaloidea
- Family: †Pseudictopidae; Sulimski, 1969

Type genus
- †Pseudictops Matthew, Granger & Simpson, 1929

Genera
- †Allictops; †Anictops; †Cartictops; †Haltictops; †Paranictops; †Pseudictops; †Suyinia

= Pseudictopidae =

Pseudictopidae Temporal range: Paleocene–Eocene, 61.7–48.6 Ma

Extinct family of mammals

Pseudictopidae is an extinct family of mammals closely related to rodents and lagomorphs. Members of the family are known from Paleocene to Eocene deposits in China and Mongolia.

== Taxonomic history ==
The family Pseudictopidae was erected in 1969 by Andrez Sulimsky as a monotypic family, with Pseudictops as the type and only genus, though later authors would assign more genera to the family. Sulimsky tentatively assigned Pseudictopidae to Eutheria incertae sedis, believing that it and Anagalidae were representatives of an unknown order. In 1971, Szalay and McKenna erected the order Anagalida, to which Pseudictopidae was assigned.
