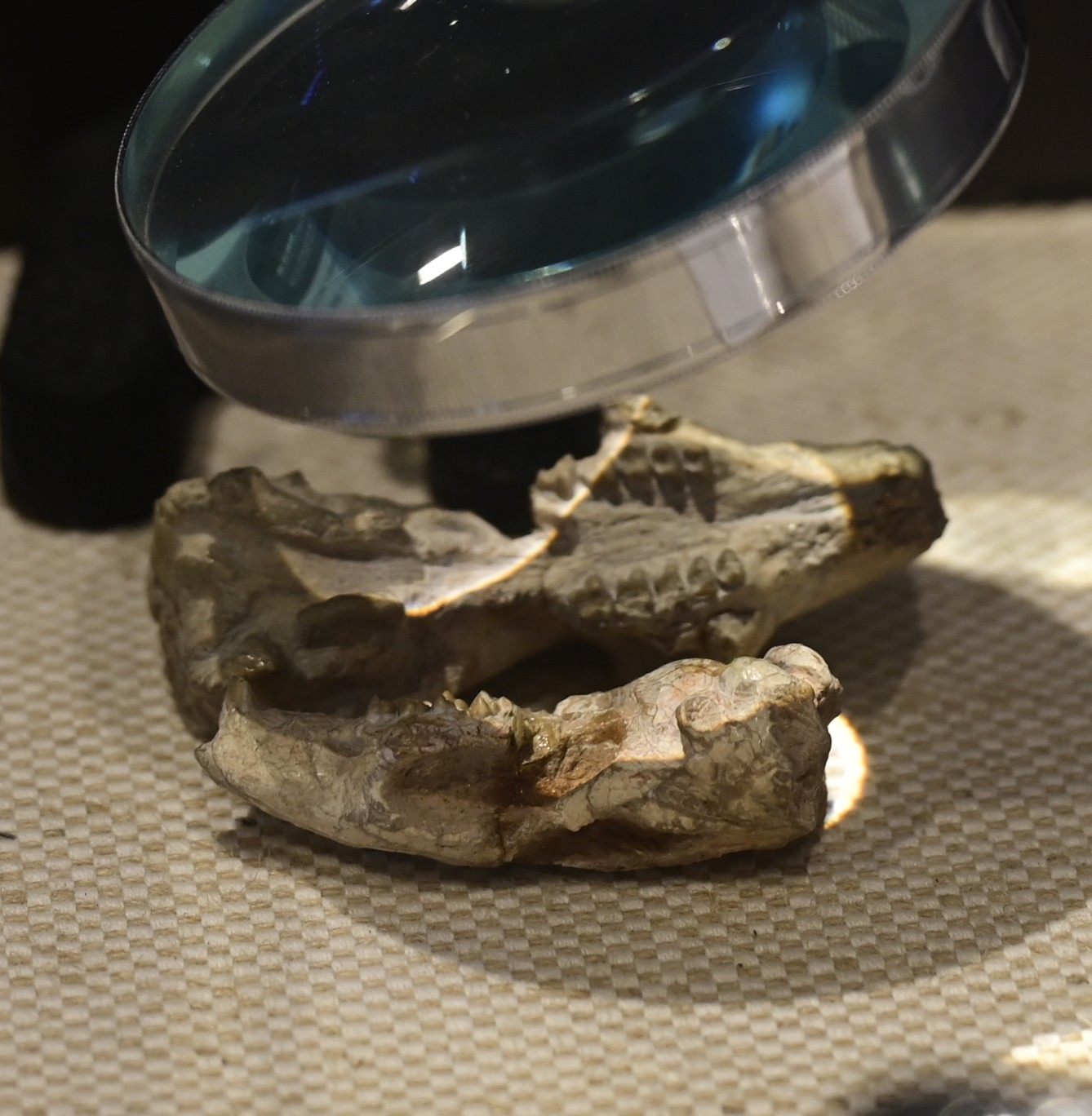
- Jaw of Rhombomylus turpanensis, Paleozoological Museum of China

Scientific classification
- Kingdom: Animalia
- Phylum: Chordata
- Class: Mammalia
- Order: incertae sedis
- Family: †Eurymylidae; Matthew, Granger, & Simpson, 1929

Genera
- †Eurymylinae; †Eurymylus; †Heomys; †Hypsimylinae; †Khaychininae; †Matutinia; †Rhombomylus; †Taizimylus; †Zagmyinae

= Eurymylidae =

Eurymylidae Temporal range: Early Paleocene–Middle Eocene

Extinct family of rodents

Eurymylidae is a family of extinct simplicidentates. Most authorities consider them to be basal to all modern rodents and suggest they may have been the ancestral stock from which the most recent common ancestor of all modern rodents (crown rodents) arose. However, the better-known eurymylids, including Eurymylus, Heomys, Matutinia, and Rhombomylus, appear to represent a monophyletic side branch that is not directly ancestral to rodents (Meng et al., 2003). Huang et al. (2004) have argued that Hanomys, Matutinia, and Rhombomylus form a clade characterized by distinctive features of the skull and dentition which should be recognized as a separate family: Rhombomylidae. Eurymylids are only known from Asia.

== Classification ==
Modified from McKenna and Bell (1997) following generic taxonomy of Ting et al. (2002) and Huang et al. (2004)

- Mirorder Simplicidentata – simplicidentates
  - Family †Eurymylidae
    - †Heomys
    - †Zagmys
    - †Nikolomylus
    - Subfamily †Eurymylinae
      - †Kazygurtia
      - †Eomylus
      - †Eurymylus
      - †Amar
      - †Hanomys
      - †Rhombomylus
      - †Matutinia
      - †Decipomys
    - Subfamily †Khaychininae
      - †Khaychina
  - Order Rodentia – crown rodents (including all extant rodents)
