= Yingabalanara =

Yingabalanara Temporal range: 20 Ma Miocene

Scientific classification
- Kingdom: Animalia
- Phylum: Chordata
- Class: Mammalia
- Infraclass: ?Tribosphenida
- Order: †Weirdodonta Archer, 1990
- Family: †Yingabalanaridae Archer, 1990
- Genus: †Yingabalanara Archer, 1990

Species
- †Yingabalanara richardsoni

Yingabalanara is an extinct mammal from the Miocene of Australia. Known only from a few teeth, its affinities with other mammal groups remain unresolved.

== Description ==
Yingabalanara is known from two lower right molar teeth. The chewing surface of the tooth has two overlapping crescent-like cusps (hence the animal's name). Due to the sheer bizarreness of the teeth it's not entirely clear to which normal molar structures these cusps correspond to, being variously interpreted as talonids, trigonids or other cusps. The molars are double-rooted, and possess what appears to be a remnant cingulid.

The overall proportions seem to suggest an animal about the size of a rat, and the tooth morphology is consistent with omnivorous habits. However, for obvious reasons the animal's overall appearance and morphology are unknown.

== Etymology ==
Yingabalanara is a Wanyi word meaning "two moons", in reference to the mammal's crescent-like cusps. The word is masculine in gender, as befitting the status of the predominantly masculine Australian lunar deities. The species name is an homage to Graham Richardson, a "Commonwealth Minister for the Environment and the Arts".

== Phylogeny ==
Yingabalanara's molars are exceptionally unusual among mammals, rendering its exact relations as controversial. Its bizarre cusps differ radically from the normal conditions seen in marsupials and placentals (though there are vague similarities to phyllostomid bats), and while slightly similar to the teeth of monotremes and other yinotheres the longer and narrower molars, presence of talonid or trigonid-like cusps and lack of lingual or buccal cingulids still set them well apart. The mammal with the most similar teeth is the Cretaceous North American Potamotelses, which serves of little indication since it too is of uncertain affinities.

For now, Yingabalanara is included in its own order, Weirdodonta.

== See also ==
- Yalkaparidon, a contemporary Australian mammal of also uncertain affinities
