= Astigalidae =

Astigalidae Temporal range: Paleocene–Eocene, 66.043–48.6 Ma

Scientific classification
- Domain: Eukaryota
- Kingdom: Animalia
- Phylum: Chordata
- Class: Mammalia
- Clade: Gliriformes
- Family: †Astigalidae; Zhang & Tong, 1981

Extinct family of mammals

Astigalidae is an extinct family of mammals related to the rodents and lagomorphs. Members of the family are known from the Paleocene and Eocene of China.

== Genera ==
- †Astigale
- †Yupingale
- †Zhujegale
