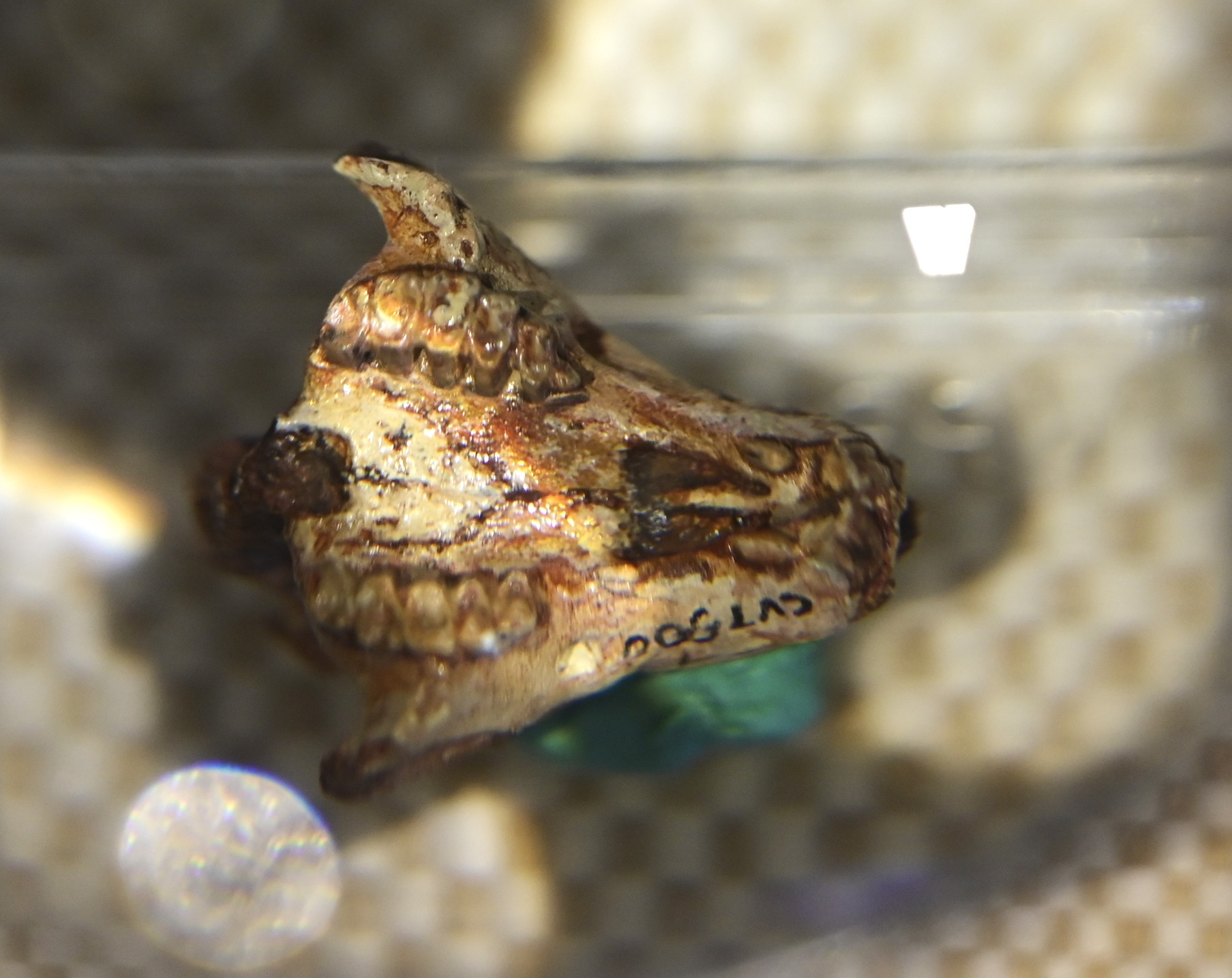
- M. wana jaw, Paleozoological Museum of China

Scientific classification
- Kingdom: Animalia
- Phylum: Chordata
- Class: Mammalia
- Infraclass: Placentalia
- Order: Lagomorpha
- Family: †Mimotonidae
- Genus: †Mimotona; Li, 1977

= Mimotona =

Mimotona Temporal range: Paleocene

Extinct genus of mammals

Mimotona is a genus of early lagomorph that lived in late Paleocene of China. Four species are described.

== Species ==
- Mimotona borealis
- Mimotona lii
- Mimotona robusta
- Mimotona wana
