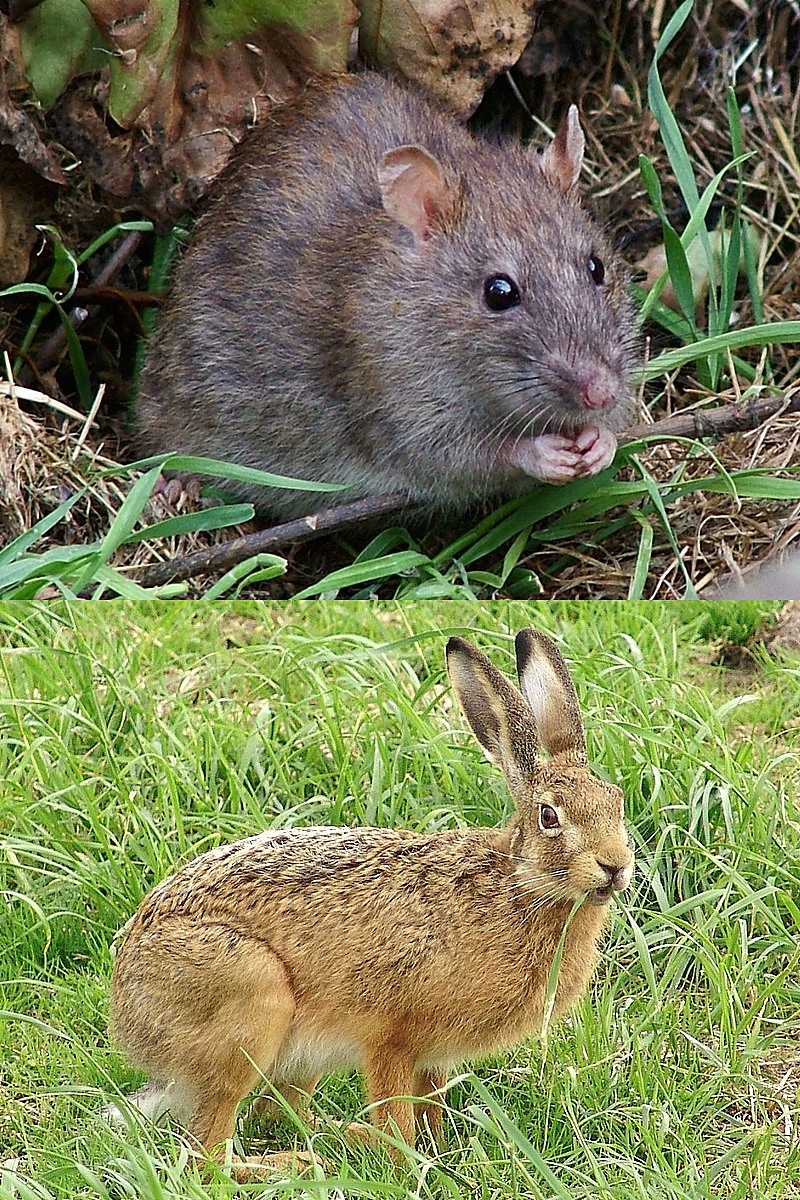
- Top: brown rat, bottom: European hare

Scientific classification
- Kingdom: Animalia
- Phylum: Chordata
- Class: Mammalia
- Magnorder: Boreoeutheria
- Superorder: Euarchontoglires
- Clade: Gliriformes
- Grandorder: Glires; Linnaeus, 1758

Subgroups
- Duplicidentata; †Mimotonida; Lagomorpha; Simplicidentata; †Mixodontia; Rodentia

= Glires =

Glires Temporal range: Paleocene–Recent

Clade of rodents and lagomorphs

Glires (/ˈɡlaɪəriːz, -aɪərz/; from Latin glīrēs 'dormice') is a clade (sometimes ranked as a grandorder) consisting of rodents and lagomorphs (rabbits, hares, and pikas). The hypothesis that these form a monophyletic group has been long debated based on morphological evidence. Two morphological studies, published in 2001 and 2003, strongly support the monophyly of Glires. In particular, the 2003 study reported the discovery of fossil material of basal members of Glires, particularly the genera Mimotona, Gomphos, Heomys, Matutinia, Rhombomylus, and Sinomylus. Their description, in 2005, helped to bridge the gap between more typical rodents and lagomorphs. Data published in 2001, based on nuclear DNA, supported Glires as a sister of Euarchonta to form Euarchontoglires, but some genetic data from both nuclear and mitochondrial DNA have been less supportive. A study, published in 2007, investigating retrotransposon presence/absence data unambiguously supports the Glires hypothesis. Studies published in 2011 and 2015 place Scandentia as a sister clade of the Glires, invalidating Euarchonta as a clade.

- Euarchontoglires
  - - Scandentia (treeshrews)
    - Glires
      - Lagomorpha (rabbits, hares, pikas)
      - Rodentia (rodents)
  - Primatomorpha
    - Dermoptera (colugos)
    - - Primates (†Plesiadapiformes, Strepsirrhini, Haplorrhini)

== General and cited sources ==
- Asher RJ, Meng J, Wible JR, et al. (February 2005). "Stem Lagomorpha and the antiquity of Glires". Science. 307 (5712): 1091–4. Bibcode:2005Sci...307.1091A. doi:10.1126/science.1107808. PMID 15718468. S2CID 42090505.
- Madsen O, Scally M, Douady CJ, et al. (February 2001). "Parallel adaptive radiations in two major clades of placental mammals". Nature. 409 (6820): 610–4. Bibcode:2001Natur.409..610M. doi:10.1038/35054544. PMID 11214318. S2CID 4398233.
- Meng J, Hu Y, Li C (2003). "The osteology of Rhombomylus (Mammalia, Glires): implications for phylogeny and evolution of Glires". Bulletin of the American Museum of Natural History. 275: 1–247. doi:10.1206/0003-0090(2003)275<0001:TOORMG>2.0.CO;2. hdl:2246/442. Archived from the original on 2023-08-06.
- Meng J, Wyss AR (2001). "The morphology of Tribosphenomys (Rodentiaformes, Mammalia): phylogenetic implications for basal Glires". Journal of Mammalian Evolution. 8 (1): 1–71. doi:10.1023/A:1011328616715. S2CID 22968979.
- Murphy WJ, Eizirik E, Johnson WE, Zhang YP, Ryder OA, O'Brien SJ (February 2001). "Molecular phylogenetics and the origins of placental mammals". Nature. 409 (6820): 614–8. Bibcode:2001Natur.409..614M. doi:10.1038/35054550. PMID 11214319. S2CID 4373847.
- Arnason U, Adegoke JA, Bodin K, et al. (June 2002). "Mammalian mitogenomic relationships and the root of the eutherian tree". Proceedings of the National Academy of Sciences of the United States of America. 99 (12): 8151–6. Bibcode:2002PNAS...99.8151A. doi:10.1073/pnas.102164299. PMC 123036. PMID 12034869.
- Kriegs JO, Churakov G, Jurka J, Brosius J, Schmitz J (April 2007). "Evolutionary history of 7SL RNA-derived SINEs in Supraprimates". Trends in Genetics. 23 (4): 158–61. doi:10.1016/j.tig.2007.02.002. PMID 17307271.
