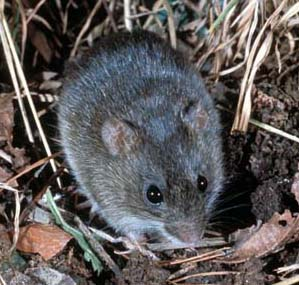
- Marsh rice rat (Oryzomys palustris)

Scientific classification
- Kingdom: Animalia
- Phylum: Chordata
- Class: Mammalia
- Grandorder: Glires
- Mirorder: Simplicidentata; Weber, 1904

Subgroups
- †Sinomylus; †Mixodontia; †Eurymylidae; Rodentia

= Simplicidentata =

Simplicidentata Temporal range: Early Paleocene to present

Group of mammals

Simplicidentata is a group of mammals that includes the rodents (order Rodentia) and their closest extinct relatives. The term has historically been used as an alternative to Rodentia, contrasting the rodents (which have one pair of upper incisors) with their close relatives the lagomorphs (which have two). However, Simplicidentata is now defined as including all members of Glires (the clade formed by lagomorphs and rodents) that share a more recent common ancestor with living rodents than with living lagomorphs. Thus, Simplicidentata is a total group that is more inclusive than Rodentia, a crown group that includes all living rodents, their last common ancestor, and all its descendants. Under this definition, the loss of the second pair of upper incisors is a synapomorphic (shared derived) feature of Simplicidentata. The loss of the second upper premolar (P2) has also been considered as synapomorphic for Simplicidentata, but the primitive simplicidentate Sinomylus does have a P2.

This sense of Simplicidentata was introduced by Chuankui Li and colleagues in 1987, who ranked Simplicidentata as a superorder including Rodentia and the extinct Mixodontia, contrasted with the superorder Duplicidentata (including Lagomorpha and the extinct Mimotonida). In their 1997 book Classification of Mammals, Malcolm C. McKenna and Susan K. Bell ranked Simplicidentata as a mirorder within the grandorder Anagalida (also including lagomorphs, macroscelideans, and some additional extinct groups). Within Simplicidentata, they recognized the orders Mixodontia (including only the extinct family Eurymylidae from the Paleocene and Eocene of Asia) and Rodentia. McKenna and Bell's decision to use Simplicidentata was criticized by reviewer Frederick S. Szalay, who preferred to simply place the Mixodontia within Rodentia, which would leave Simplicidentata unnecessary. In The Beginning of the Age of Mammals (2006), Kenneth Rose recognized a mirorder Simplicidentata, including Mixodontia, Rodentia, and the genus Sinomylus (not placed in either order), within the superorder Anagalida.

== Literature cited ==
- Landry, S.O., Jr. 1999. A proposal for a new classification and nomenclature for the Glires (Lagomorpha and Rodentia). Mitteilungen aus dem Museum für Naturkunde in Berlin, Zoologische Reihe 75(2):283–316.
- McKenna, M.C. and Bell, S.K. 1997. Classification of Mammals: Above the species level. New York: Columbia University Press, 631 pp. ISBN 978-0-231-11013-6
- McKenna, M.C. and Meng, J. 2001. A primitive relative of rodents from the Chinese Paleocene. Journal of Vertebrate Paleontology 21(3):565–572.
- Meng, J. and Wyss, A.R. 1994. Enamel microstructure of Tribosphenomys (Mammalia, Glires): Character analysis and systematic implications. Journal of Mammalian Evolution 2(3):185–203.
- Meng, J. and Wyss, A.R. 2001. The morphology of Tribosphenomys (Rodentiaformes, Mammalia): phylogenetic implications for basal Glires. Journal of Mammalian Evolution 8(1):1–71.
- Meng, J., Hu, Y. and Li, C. 2003. The osteology of Rhombomylus (Mammalia, Glires): implications for phylogeny and evolution of Glires. Bulletin of the American Museum of Natural History, 275:1–247.
- Meng, J., Kraatz, B.P., Wang, Y., Ni, X., Gebo, D.L. and Beard, K.C. 2009. A new species of Gomphos (Glires, Mammalia) from the Eocene of the Erlian Basin, Nei Mongol, China. American Museum Novitates 3670:1–11.
- Rose, K.D. 2006. The Beginning of the Age of Mammals. Baltimore: The Johns Hopkins University Press, 428 pp. ISBN 978-0-8018-8472-6
- Szalay, F.S. 1999. [Review of] Classification of Mammals: Above the Species Level (subscription required). Journal of Vertebrate Paleontology 19(1):191–195.
