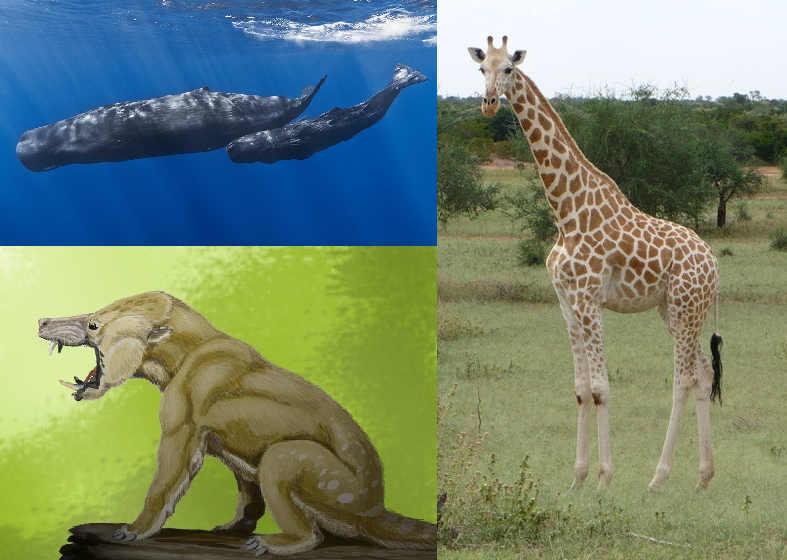

Scientific classification
- Kingdom: Animalia
- Phylum: Chordata
- Class: Mammalia
- (unranked): Euungulata
- (unranked): Eparctocyona

= Eparctocyona =

Clade of mammals

Eparctocyona is a clade of placental mammals comprising the artiodactyls (even-toed ungulates), cetacea (whales and related), and the extinct condylarths.
