= Anagaloidea =

Anagaloidea Temporal range: Paleocene–Early Oligocene
- Life restoration of Anagale gobiensis

Scientific classification
- Kingdom: Animalia
- Phylum: Chordata
- Class: Mammalia
- Superorder: Euarchontoglires
- Clade: Gliriformes
- Order: †Anagaloidea

Families
- Anagalidae; Pseudictopidae; Astigalidae?; Zalambdalestidae?

Extinct order of mammals

Anagaloidea is a former order of extinct placental mammals that first appeared during the Paleocene epoch.

== Taxonomy ==
According to the traditional (morphological) view, Anagaloidea is part of the superorder Anagalida, along with the elephant shrews, rodents and lagomorphs.

However, the Anagalida are considered to be polyphyletic. Genetic studies have shown that the elephant shrews are actually part of a different macro-group of mammals called the Afrotheria, while the position of several extinct families of Anagalida is uncertain. The Zalambdalestidae are almost certainly unrelated to any of these groups; they probably represent more basal Eutherians and might not even be true Eutherians at all.

The Anagalidae and the Pseudictopidae probably represent a genuine clade. This clade is known as the Anagaloidea, which seems to be related to the rodents and lagomorphs after all. Together they form the clade Glires, often grouped with the Euarchonta to form the superorder Euarchontoglires.

=== Classification ===
- Superorder Anagalida *
  - Order Anagaloidea
    - Family Anagalidae
      - Genus Anagale
    - Family Pseudictopidae
    - Family Astigalidae?
