= Anagalidae =

Anagalidae Temporal range: Paleocene–Oligocene, 61.7–28.4 Ma
- Life restoration of Anagale gobiensis

Scientific classification
- Kingdom: Animalia
- Phylum: Chordata
- Class: Mammalia
- Order: †Anagaloidea
- Family: †Anagalidae; Simpson, 1931

Extinct family of mammals

Anagalidae is an extinct family of mammals closely related to rodents and lagomorphs. Members of the family are known from Paleocene to Oligocene deposits in China and Mongolia.

== Genera ==
The family contains the following genera:

- †Anagale
- †Anagalopsis
- †Anaptogale
- †Chianshania
- †Decoreodon?
- †Diacronus
- †Eosigale
- †Hsiuannania
- †Huaiyangale
- †Interogale
- †Linnania
- †Palasiodon?
- †Qipania
- †Stenanagale
- †Wanogale
- †Yuodon?
- †Zofiagale
