= Paoniuquan Formation =

Geologic formation in China

- Stratigraphic range: Late Oligocene, Tabenbulakian 28.4–23.03 Ma
- Type: Formation
- Unit of: Danghe area
- Underlies: Tiejianggou Formation
- Overlies: Fault F ' 0
- Thickness: 1,000 metres (3,300 ft)

Lithology
- Primary: mudstone, siltstone
- Other: conglomerate

Location
- Region: Gansu
- Country: China

The Paoniuquan Formation is a geologic formation of Gansu, China preserving fossils from the late Oligocene, specifically the Tabenbulukian mammal age. Animals found in this formation are considered to be within the Yindirte Fauna.

== Description ==
The Paoniuquan Formation is named after a local spring found towards the southeast of Tiejianggou. It is the basal member of the Danghe area being made up of fine-grained, red mudstones and siltstones with a maximum depth of over 1000m.

Though most units of the Danghe area represent lacustrine facies during the Oligocene, the top and bottom units of the Paoniuquan Formation represent more fluvial environments; both of these environments would have been in "low relief" terrain During the deposition of the formation, there is no indication of the presence of intensive seismic activity in the western area Danghe Nan Shan.

== Paleobiota ==
=== Artiodactyla ===
Genus	Species	Notes	Image
Parabrachyodus	P. sp	An anthracotheriid known from a m1/2 that was originally referred to Sivameryx. Ihough similar to P. hyopotamoides, the tooth has a lower crown than what is seen in the taxon.	

=== Eulipotyphla ===
Genus	Species	Notes	Image
Amphechinus	A?. sp	An erinaceid eulipotyphlan.	
Palaeoscaptor	P. cf. P. acridens	An erinaceid known from various parts of the dentition, the m3 being closest to what is seen in P. acridens though is smaller.	
Palaeoscaptor	P. sp	An erinaceid known from a single P4 similar to what is seen in P. acridens though is larger.	

=== Lagomorpha ===
Genus	Species	Notes	Image
Desmatolagus	D. gobiensis	An ochotonid with high-crowned dentition with distinct roots, the size and occlusion pattern of the teeth are identical to those seen in the species.	
Desmatolagus	D. pusillus	An ochotonid that is smaller in size than D. gobiensis along with larger crowns. The morphology of the teeth are identical to what is seen in the species.	

=== Perissodactyla ===
Genus	Species	Notes	Image
Allacerops	A. sp	A hyracodontid known from a fragmentary mandible with a high-crowned M1 with features similar to what is seen in Allacerops. The material from the formation is larger than other species documented in Central Asia.	
Schizotherium	S. ordosium	A chalicotheriid that represents the most basal member of the subfamily schizotheriinae, S. ordosium being the largest species of the genus.	

=== Rodentia ===
Genus	Species	Notes	Image
Asianeomys	A. dangheensis	An eomyid rodent.	
Coelodontomys	C. asiaticus	A medium-sized tsaganomyid with a protrogomorphous skull and a hystricognathous mandible.	
Cricetidae gen. et sp. indet.		A cricetidae known from an incomplete m1.	
Cyclomylus	C. sp	A tsaganomyid rodent.	
Heterosminthus	H. lanzhouensis	A dipodid known from a m1 and m3 with the material in the formation being the first time a m3 had been attributed to the species.	
Litodonomys	L. cf. L . huangheensis	A dipodid known from a m2 similar in morphology to L . huangheensis though with a few features different from the species like the shape in occlusal view.	
Oligosciurus	O. dangheensis	A small sciurid with brachydont cheek teeth, the lower molars of the animal are similar to what is seen in Cedromus though is of as smaller size.	
Parasminthus	P. asiaecentralis	A dipodid known from various parts of the dentition at the formation with dentition identical to what is seen in the species.	
Parasminthus	P. spp.	A dipodid known from teeth, most likely from different species. These being specifically similar to P. tangingoli and P. parvulus.	
Parasminthus	P. parvulus	A dipodid known from cheek teeth at the formation with cheek teeth identical to the species.	
Parasminthus	P. tangingoli	A dipodid known from cheek teeth along with a lower jaw, though the M3 of the material seen at the formation does have an initial double protoloph. This feature can most likely be attributed to individual variation within the species.	
Tataromys	T. cf. T. sigmodon	A ctenodactylid known from a m1/2 very similar to what is seen in T. sigmodon though is smaller in size.	
Tataromys	T. sp. t. cf. parvus	A ctenodactylid known from an incomplete mandible that was originally described under the genus Karakoromys.	
