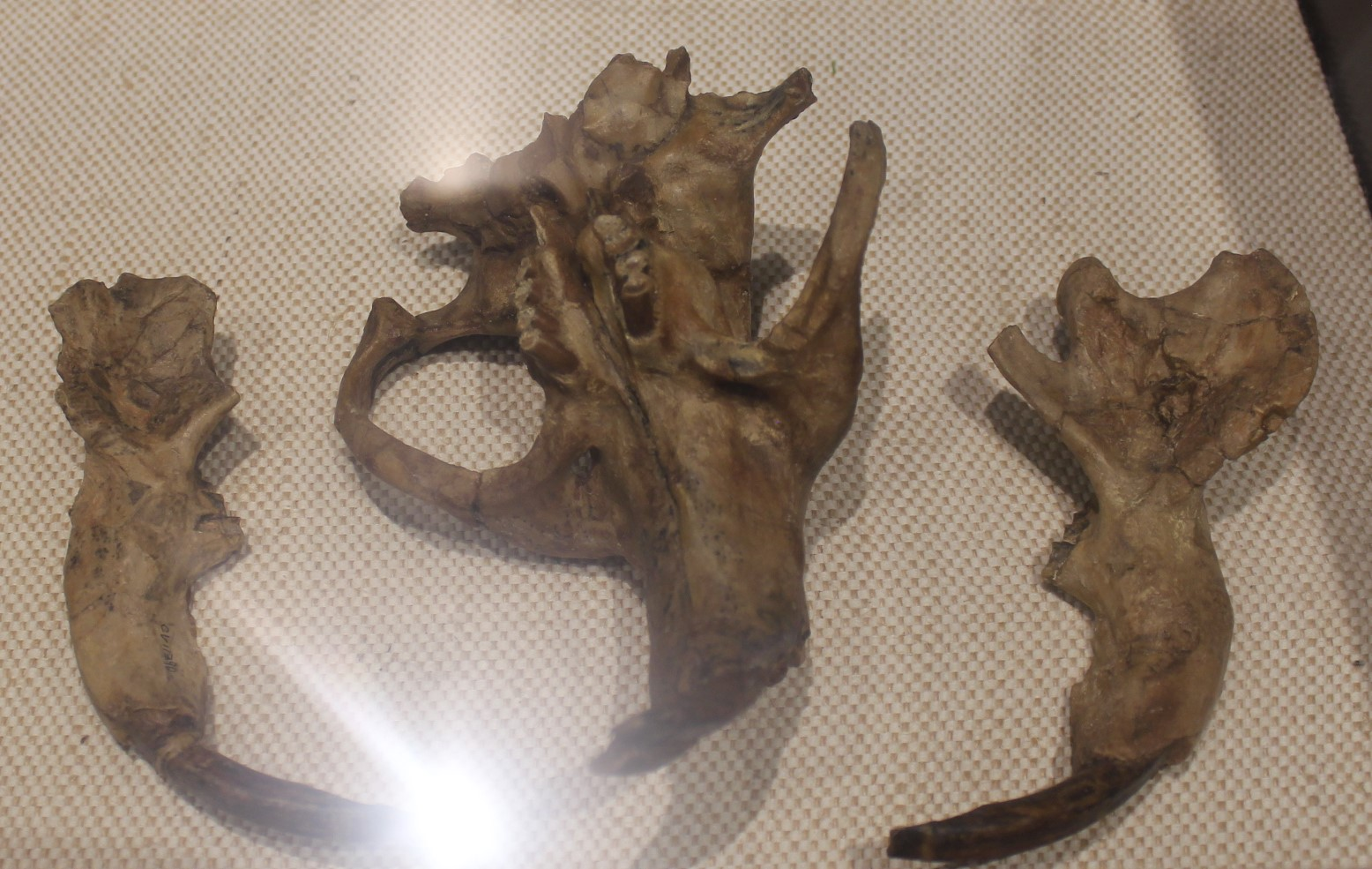
- Fossil skull and jaws (IVPP V11390) of T. altaicus, Paleozoological Museum of China

Scientific classification
- Kingdom: Animalia
- Phylum: Chordata
- Class: Mammalia
- Order: Rodentia
- Family: †Tsaganomyidae
- Genus: †Tsaganomys; Matthew & Granger, 1923
- Species: †T. altaicus

Binomial name
- †Tsaganomys altaicus Matthew & Granger, 1923

= Tsaganomys =

Tsaganomys Temporal range: Early Oligocene to ?Early Miocene

Extinct genus of rodents

Tsaganomys altaicus is an extinct species of rodent from Asia, and the only species in the genus Tsaganomys.

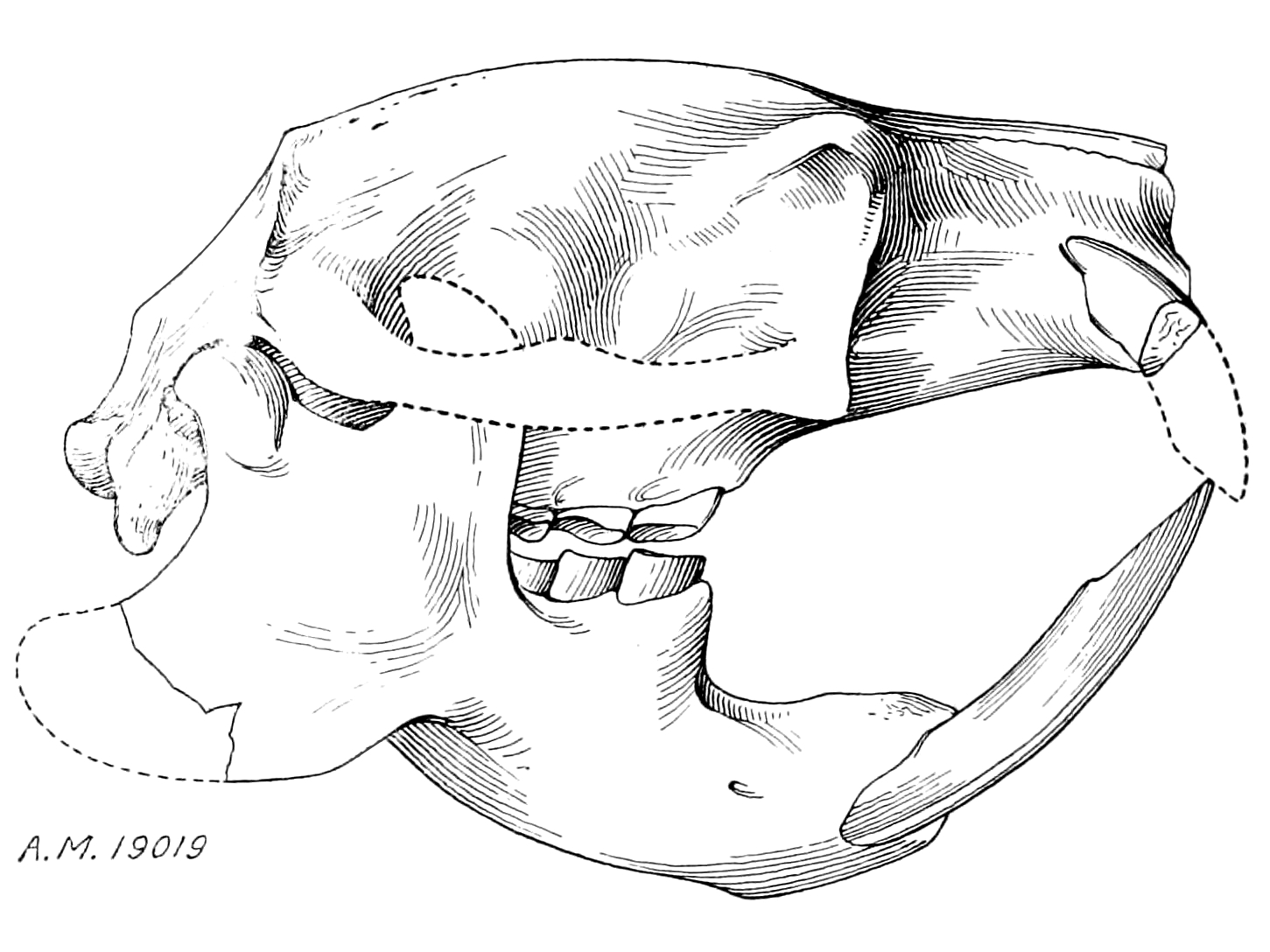
Skull reconstruction

Junior synonyms and likely junior synonyms:

- Cyclomylus lohensis
- Cyclomylus minutus
- Sepulkomys eboretus
- Beatomus bisus
- Pseudotsaganomys mongolicus
- Pseudotsaganomys turgaicus
