= Hsandagolian =

Age of geologic time

The Hsandagolian age is an Asian Land Mammal Age (33.9 – 31 Ma) within the Oligocene epoch of the Paleogene. It follows the Kekeamuan or the Ergilian, and precedes the Tabenbulakian age. It is named after the Hsanda Gol Formation of Mongolia and correlates to the Orellan and (partially) the Whitneyan NALMAs in North America.
