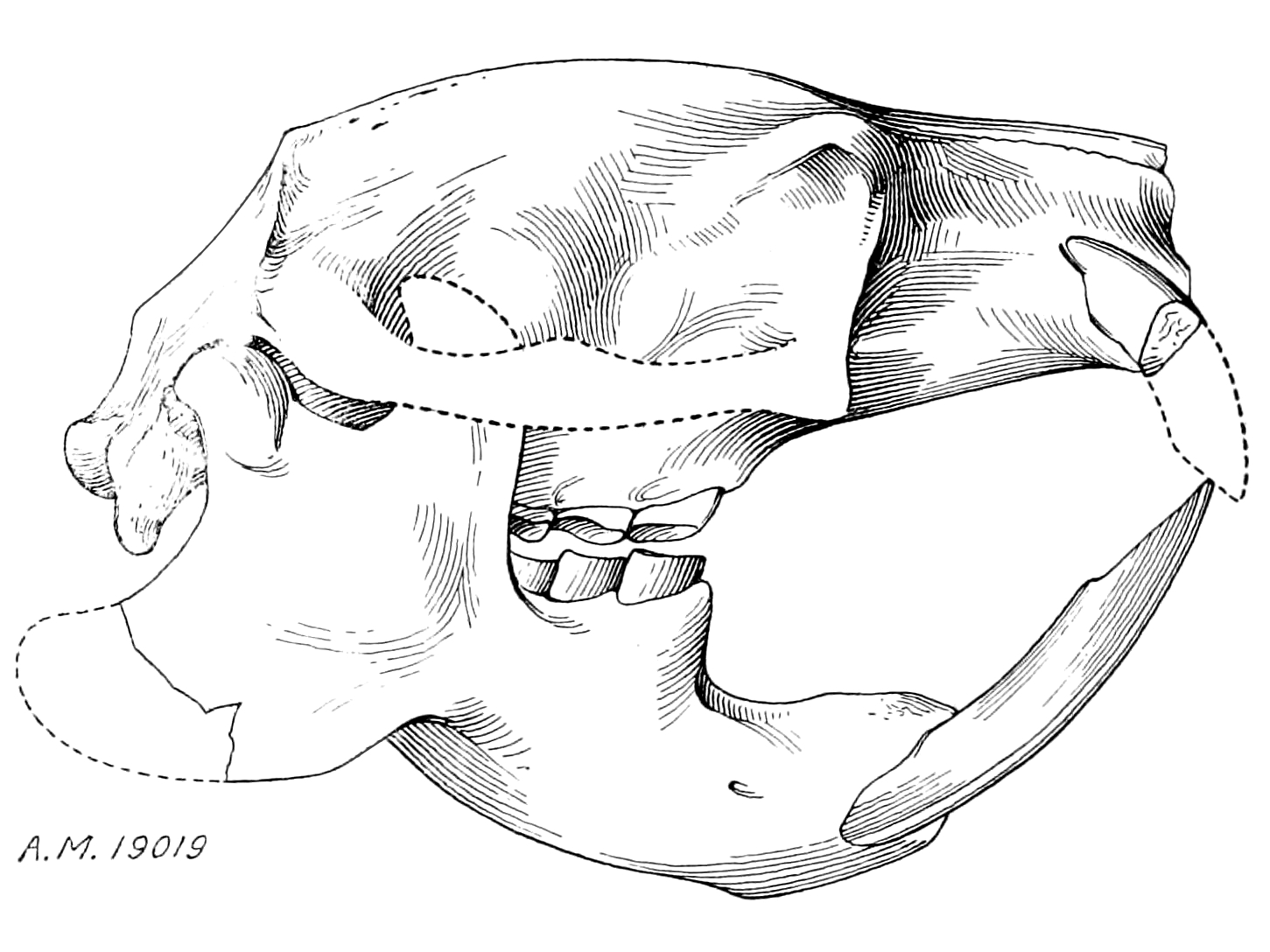
- Skull of Tsaganomys altaicus

Scientific classification
- Domain: Eukaryota
- Kingdom: Animalia
- Phylum: Chordata
- Class: Mammalia
- Order: Rodentia
- Suborder: Hystricomorpha
- Family: †Tsaganomyidae; Matthew & Granger, 1923

Genera
- †Tsaganomys †Cyclomylus †Coelodontomys

= Tsaganomyidae =

Tsaganomyidae Temporal range: Early Oligocene to ?Early Miocene

Extinct family of rodents

The Tsaganomyidae are an extinct family of rodents from Asia. It contains three genera. Tsaganomyids are generally considered to be related to the Hystricognathi (porcupines and relatives). Members of Tsaganomyidae were fossorial (digging) rodents that probably used their incisor teeth to dig like some living mole rats.

== Characteristics ==
Tsaganomyids had a protrogomorphous zygomasseteric system, a hystricognathous lower jaw, and multiserial enamel in their incisor teeth.
