= Tabenbulakian =

Age of geologic time

The Tabenbulakian age is a period of geologic time within the Oligocene Epoch of the late Paleogene Period and Miocene Epoch of the early Neogene Period, used more specifically with Asian Land Mammal Ages.

It follows the Hsandagolian age.

== See also ==
- Oligocene mammals of Asia
- Miocene mammals of Asia
