= Oligocene =

Third epoch of the Paleogene Period

- 33.9 – 23.04 Ma
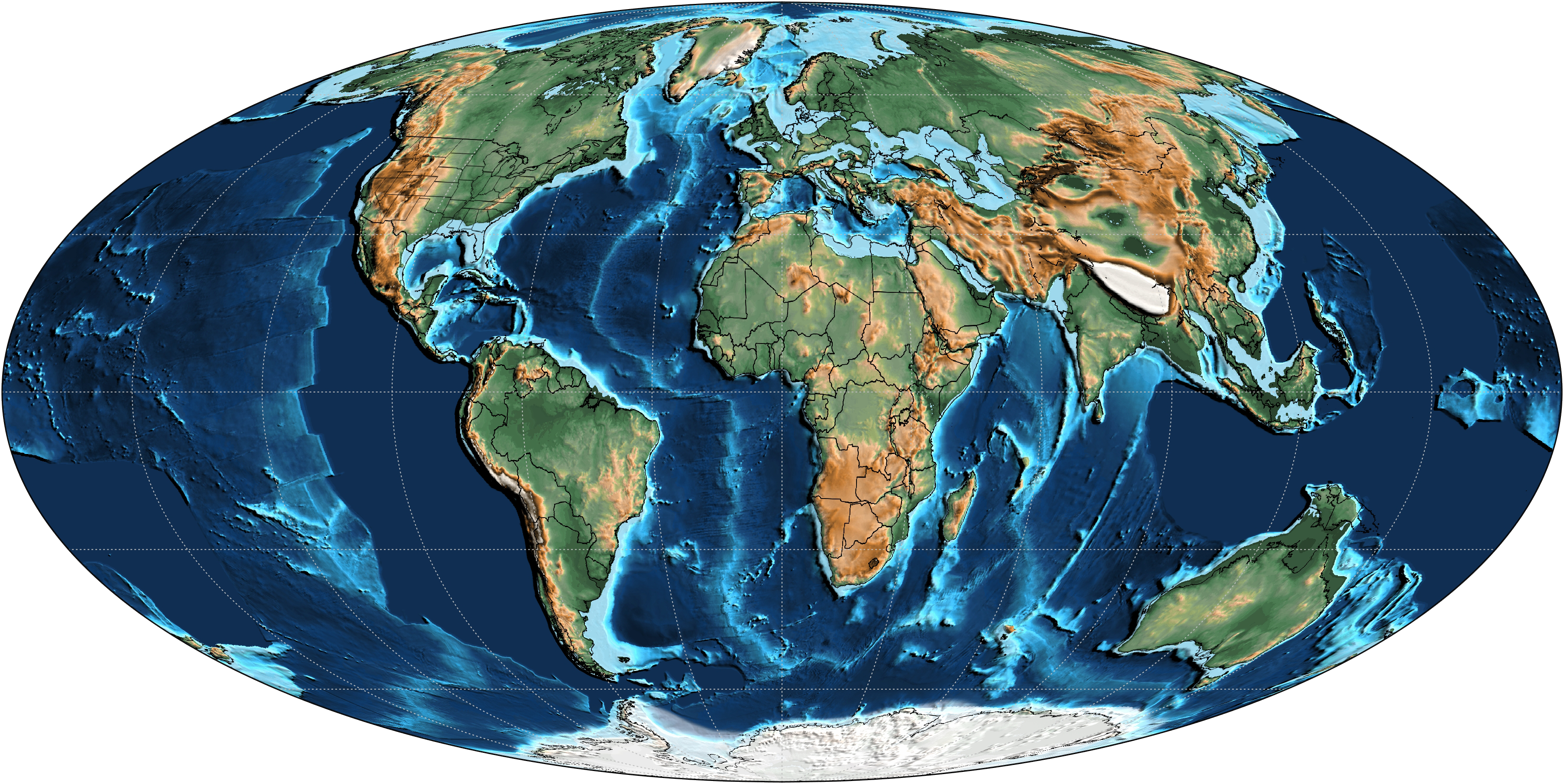
- A map of Earth as it appeared 30 million years ago during the Oligocene Epoch, Rupelian Age

Chronology
← / PETM; ← / First Antarctic permanent ice-sheets; ← / K-Pg mass extinction
Subdivision of the Paleogene according to the ICS, as of 2024. Vertical axis scale: Millions of years ago

Etymology
- Name formality: Formal
- Name ratified: 1978

Usage information
- Celestial body: Earth
- Regional usage: Global (ICS)
- Time scale(s) used: ICS Time Scale

Definition
- Chronological unit: Epoch
- Stratigraphic unit: Series
- Time span formality: Formal
- Lower boundary definition: LAD of Planktonic Foraminifers Hantkenina and Cribrohantkenina
- Lower boundary GSSP: Massignano quarry section, Massignano, Ancona, Italy; 43.5328°N 13.6011°E
- Lower GSSP ratified: 1992
- Upper boundary definition: Base of magnetic polarity chronozone C6Cn.2n.; FAD of the Planktonic Foraminiferan Paragloborotalia kugleri
- Upper boundary GSSP: Lemme-Carrosio Section, Carrosio, Italy; 44.6589°N 8.8364°E
- Upper GSSP ratified: 1996

The Oligocene (Note: Pronounced /ˈɒlɪɡəsiːn, -ɡoʊ-/ OL-ə-gə-seen, -goh-; also /ɒˈlɪɡəsiːn, -ɡoʊ-/ ol-IH-gə-seen, -goh-) is a geologic epoch of the Paleogene Period that extends from about 33.9 million to 23 million years before the present (33.9±0.1 to 23.04±0.05 Ma). As with other older geologic periods, the rock beds that define the epoch are well identified but the exact dates of the start and end of the epoch are slightly uncertain. The name Oligocene was coined in 1854 by the German paleontologist Heinrich Ernst Beyrich from his studies of marine beds in Belgium and Germany. The name comes from Ancient Greek ὀλίγος (olígos), lit. 'few', and καινός (kainós), lit. 'new', and refers to the sparsity of extant forms of molluscs. The Oligocene is preceded by the Eocene Epoch and is followed by the Miocene Epoch. The Oligocene is the third and final epoch of the Paleogene Period.

The Oligocene is often considered an important time of transition, a link between the archaic world of the tropical Eocene and the more modern ecosystems of the Miocene. Major changes during the Oligocene included a global expansion of grasslands, and a regression of tropical broad leaf forests to the equatorial belt.

The start of the Oligocene is marked by a notable extinction event called the Grande Coupure; it featured the replacement of European fauna with Asian fauna, except for the endemic rodent and marsupial families. By contrast, the Oligocene–Miocene boundary is not set at an easily identified worldwide event but rather at regional boundaries between the warmer late Oligocene and the relatively cooler Miocene.

== Boundaries and subdivisions ==
The lower boundary of the Oligocene (its Global Boundary Stratotype Section and Point or GSSP) is placed at the last appearance of the foraminiferan genus Hantkenina in a quarry at Massignano, Italy. However, this GSSP has been criticized as excluding the uppermost part of the type Eocene Priabonian Stage and because it is slightly earlier than important climate shifts that form natural markers for the boundary, such as the global oxygen isotope shift marking the expansion of Antarctic glaciation (the Oi1 event).

The upper boundary of the Oligocene is defined by its GSSP at Carrosio, Italy, which coincides with the first appearance of the foraminiferan Paragloborotalia kugleri and with the base of magnetic polarity chronozone C6Cn.2n.

Oligocene faunal stages from youngest to oldest are:

Chattian or late Oligocene	(27.3 million years ago– 23.04 mya)
Rupelian or early Oligocene	(33.9 million years ago– 27.3 mya)

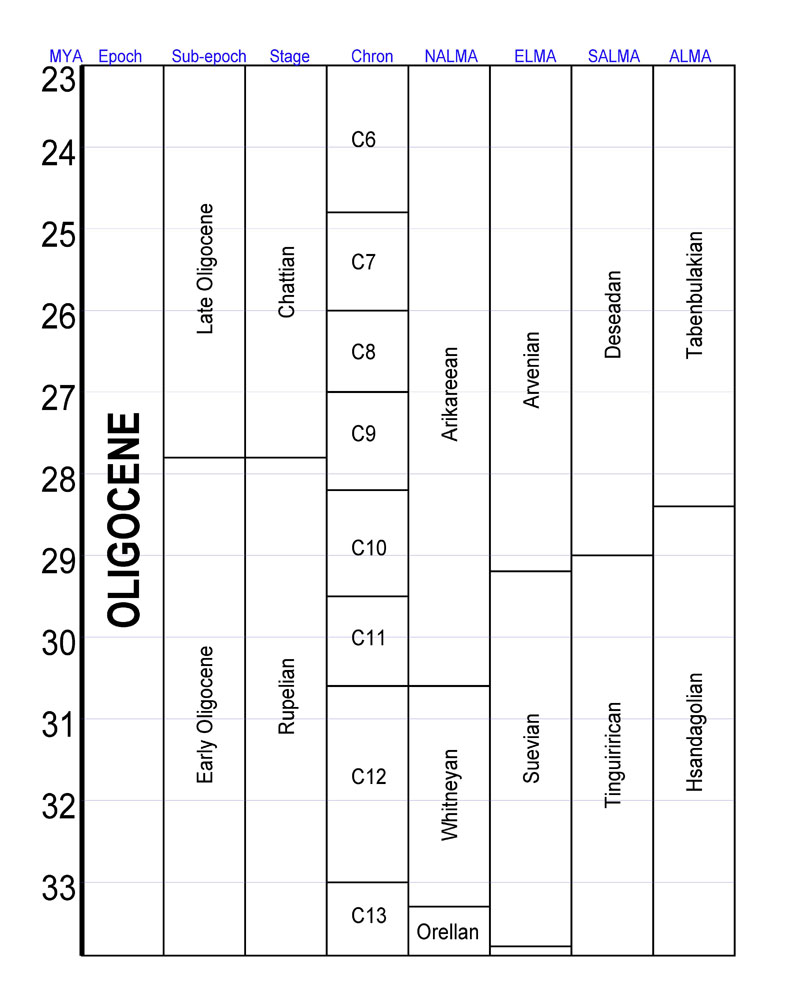
Subdivisions of the Oligocene

== Tectonics and paleogeography ==
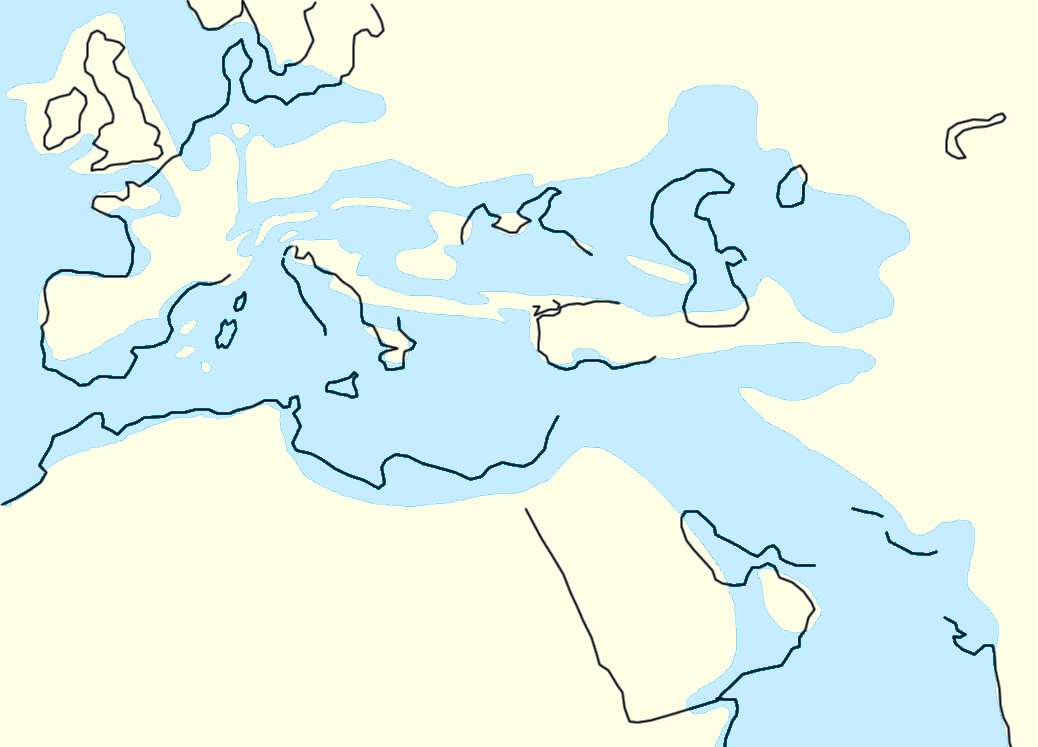
Neotethys during the Oligocene (Rupelian, 33.9–28.4 mya)

During the Oligocene Epoch, the continents continued to drift toward their present positions. Antarctica became more isolated as deep ocean channels were established between Antarctica and Australia and South America. Australia had been very slowly drifting away from West Antarctica since the Jurassic, but the exact timing of the establishment of ocean channels between the two continents remains uncertain. However, one estimate is that a deep channel was in place between the two continents by the end of the early Oligocene. The timing of the formation of the Drake Passage between South America and Antarctica is also uncertain, with estimates ranging from 49 to 17 mya (early Eocene to Miocene), but oceanic circulation through the Drake Passage may also have been in place by the end of the early Oligocene. This may have been interrupted by a temporary constriction of the Drake Passage from sometime in the middle to late Oligocene (29 to 22 mya) to the middle Miocene (15 mya).

The reorganization of the oceanic tectonic plates of the northeastern Pacific, which had begun in the Paleocene, culminated with the arrival of the Murray and Mendocino Fracture Zones at the North American subduction zone in the Oligocene. This initiated strike-slip movement along the San Andreas Fault and extensional tectonics in the Basin and Range province, ended volcanism south of the Cascades, and produced clockwise rotation of many western North American terranes. The Rocky Mountains were at their peak. A new volcanic arc was established in western North America, far inland from the coast, reaching from central Mexico through the Mogollon-Datil volcanic field to the San Juan volcanic field, then through Utah and Nevada to the ancestral Northern Cascades. Huge ash deposits from these volcanoes created the White River and Arikaree Groups of the High Plains, with their excellent fossil beds.

Between 31 and 26 mya, the Ethiopia-Yemen Continental Flood Basalts were emplaced by the East African large igneous province, which also initiated rift formation along the Red Sea and Gulf of Aden.

The Alps were rapidly rising in Europe as the African plate continued to push north into the Eurasian plate, isolating the remnants of the Tethys Sea. Sea levels were lower in the Oligocene than in the early Eocene, exposing large coastal plains in Europe and the Gulf Coast and Atlantic Coast of North America. The Obik Sea, which had separated Europe from Asia, retreated early in the Oligocene, creating a persistent land connection between the continents. The Paratethys Sea stretched from what is now the Balkan Peninsula across Central Asia to the Tian Shan region of what is now Xinjiang. There appears to have been a land bridge in the early Oligocene between North America and Europe, since the faunas of the two regions are very similar. However, towards the end of the Oligocene, there was a brief marine incursion in Europe.

The rise of the Himalayas during the Oligocene remains poorly understood. One recent hypothesis is that a separate microcontinent collided with south Asia in the early Eocene, and India itself did not collide with south Asia until the end of the Oligocene. The Tibetan Plateau may have reached nearly its present elevation by the late Oligocene.

The Andes first became a major mountain chain in the Oligocene, as subduction became more direct into the coastline.

== Climate ==
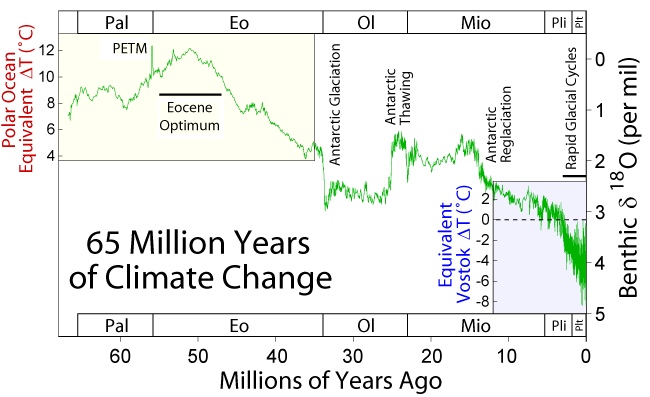
Climate change during the last 65 million years

Climate during the Oligocene reflected a general cooling trend following the Early Eocene Climatic Optimum. This transformed the Earth's climate from a greenhouse to an icehouse climate.

=== Eocene-Oligocene transition and Oi1 event ===
The Eocene-Oligocene transition was a major cooling event and reorganization of the biosphere, being part of a broader trend of global cooling lasting from the Bartonian to the Rupelian. The transition is marked by the Oi1 event, an oxygen isotope excursion occurring approximately 33.55 million years ago, during which oxygen isotope ratios decreased by 1.3‰. About 0.3–0.4‰ of this is estimated to be due to major expansion of Antarctic ice sheets. The remaining 0.9 to 1.0‰ was due to about 5 to 6 °C (9 to 10 °F) of global cooling. The transition likely took place in three closely spaced steps over the period from 33.8 to 33.5 mya. By the end of the transition, sea levels had dropped by 105 meters (344 ft), and ice sheets were 25% greater in extent than in the modern world.

The effects of the transition can be seen in the geological record at many locations around the world. Ice volumes rose as temperature and sea levels dropped. Playa lakes of the Tibetan Plateau disappeared at the transition, pointing to cooling and aridification of central Asia. Pollen and spore counts in marine sediments of the Norwegian-Greenland Sea indicate a drop in winter temperatures at high latitudes of about 5 °C (9.0 °F) just prior to the Oi1 event. Borehole dating from the Southeast Faroes drift indicates that deep-ocean circulation from the Arctic Ocean to the North Atlantic Ocean began in the early Oligocene.

The best terrestrial record of Oligocene climate comes from North America, where temperatures dropped by 7 to 11 °C (13 to 20 °F) in the earliest Oligocene. This change is seen from Alaska to the Gulf Coast. Upper Eocene paleosols reflect annual precipitation of over a meter of rain, but early Oligocene precipitation was less than half this. In central North America, the cooling was by 8.2 ± 3.1 °C over a period of 400,000 years, though there is little indication of significant increase in aridity during this interval. Ice-rafted debris in the Norwegian-Greenland Sea indicated that glaciers had appeared in Greenland by the start of the Oligocene.

Continental ice sheets in Antarctica reached sea level during the transition. Glacially rafted debris of early Oligocene age in the Weddell Sea and Kerguelen Plateau, in combination with Oi1 isotope shift, provides unambiguous evidence of a continental ice sheet on Antarctica by the early Oligocene.

The causes of the Eocene-Oligocene transition are not yet fully understood. The timing is wrong for this to be caused either by known impact events or by the volcanic activity on the Ethiopean Plateau. Two other possible drivers of climate change, not mutually exclusive, have been proposed. The first is thermal isolation of the continent of Antarctica by development of the Antarctic Circumpolar Current. Deep sea cores from south of New Zealand suggest that cold deep-sea currents were present by the early Oligocene. However, the timing of this event remains controversial. The other possibility, for which there is considerable evidence, is a drop in atmospheric carbon dioxide levels (pCO2) during the transition. The pCO2 is estimated to have dropped just before the transition, to 760 ppm at the peak of ice sheet growth, then rebounded slightly before resuming a more gradual fall. Climate modeling suggests that glaciation of Antarctica took place only when pCO2 dropped below a critical threshold value.

Brachiopod oxygen isotope ratios from New Zealand suggest that a proto-Subtropical Convergence developed during the Early Oligocene, with northern New Zealand being subtropical and southern and eastern New Zealand being cooled by cold, subantarctic water.

=== Middle Oligocene climate and the Oi2 event ===
Oligocene climate following the Eocene-Oligocene event is poorly known. There were several pulses of glaciation in middle Oligocene, about the time of the Oi2 oxygen isotope shift. This led to the largest drop of sea level in past 100 million years, by about 75 meters (246 ft). This is reflected in a mid-Oligocene incision of continental shelves and unconformities in marine rocks around the world.

Some evidence suggests that the climate remained warm at high latitudes even as ice sheets experienced cyclical growth and retreat in response to orbital forcing and other climate drivers. Other evidence indicates significant cooling at high latitudes. Part of the difficulty may be that there were strong regional variations in the response to climate shifts. Evidence of a relatively warm Oligocene suggests an enigmatic climate state, neither hothouse nor icehouse.

=== Late Oligocene warming ===
The late Oligocene (26.5 to 24 mya) likely saw a warming trend in spite of low pCO2 levels, though this appears to vary by region. However, Antarctica remained heavily glaciated during this warming period. The late Oligocene warming is discernible in pollen counts from the Tibetan Plateau, which also show that the South Asian Monsoon had already developed by the late Oligocene. Around 25.8 Ma, the South Asian Monsoon underwent an episode of major intensification brought on by the uplift of the Tibetan Plateau.

A deep 400,000-year glaciated Oligocene-Miocene boundary event is recorded at McMurdo Sound and King George Island.

== Biosphere ==
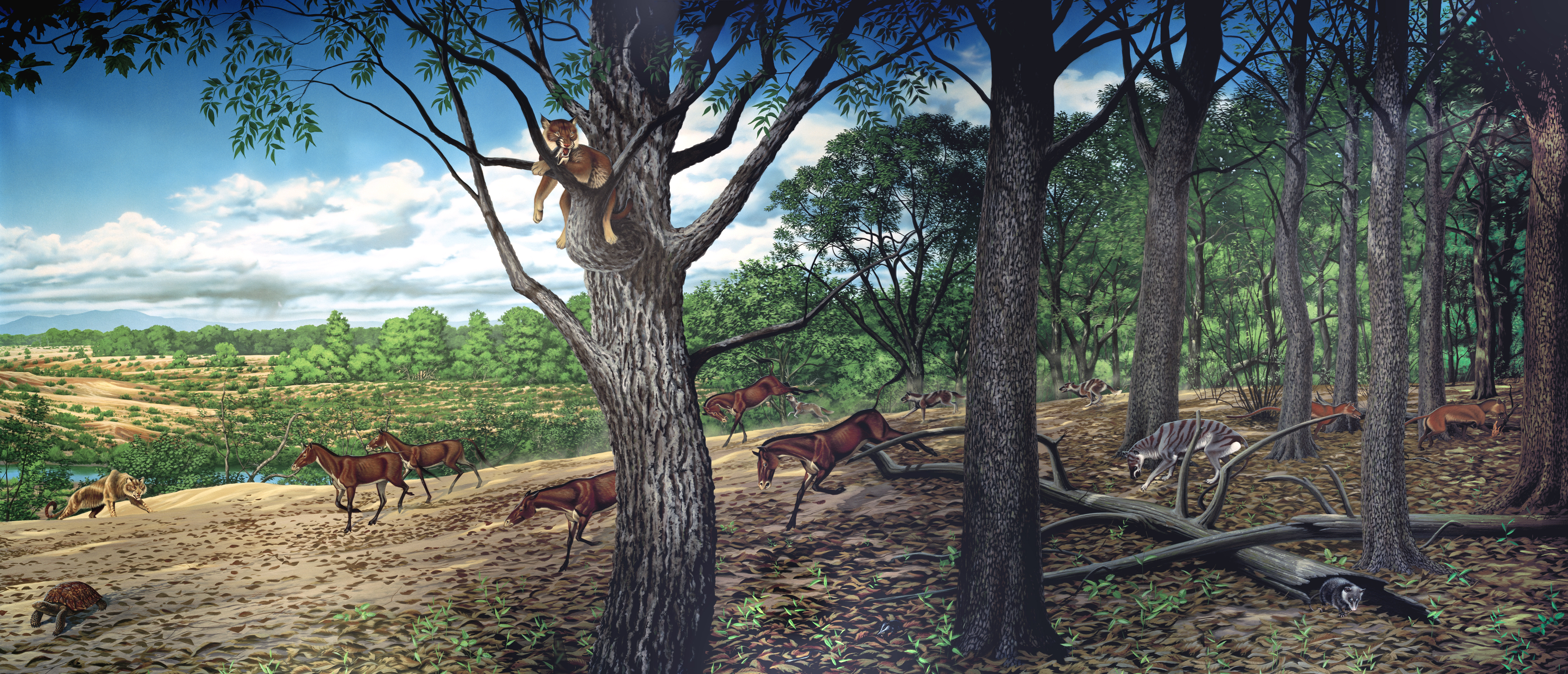
Restoration of Nimravus (far left) and other animals from the Turtle Cove Formation

The early Eocene climate was very warm, with crocodilians and temperate plants thriving north of the Arctic Circle. The cooling trend that began in the middle Eocene continued into the Oligocene, bringing both poles well below freezing for the first time in the Phanerozoic. The cooling climate, together with the opening of some land bridges and the closing of others, led to a profound reorganization of the biosphere and loss of taxonomic diversity. Land animals and marine organisms reached a Phanerozoic low in diversity by the late Oligocene, and the temperate forests and jungles of the Eocene were replaced by forest and scrubland. The closing of the Tethys Seaway destroyed its tropical biota.

=== Flora ===
The Oi1 event of the Eocene-Oligocene transition covered the continent of Antarctica with ice sheets, leaving Nothofagus and mosses and ferns clinging to life around the periphery of Antarctica in tundra conditions.

Angiosperms continued their expansion throughout the world as tropical and sub-tropical forests were replaced by temperate deciduous forests. Open plains and deserts became more common and grasses expanded from their water-bank habitat in the Eocene moving out into open tracts. The decline in pCO2 favored C4 photosynthesis, which is found only in angiosperms and is particularly characteristic of grasses. However, even at the end of the period, grass was not quite common enough for modern savannas.

In North America, much of the dense forest was replaced by patchy scrubland with riparian forests. Subtropical species dominated with cashews and lychee trees present, and temperate woody plants such as roses, beeches, and pines were common. The legumes spread, while sedges and ferns continued their ascent.

In Europe, floral assemblages became increasingly affected by strengthening seasonality as it related to wildfire activity.

In Pakistan, the flora consisted mainly of dry but dense forests. In northern China, there was a progressive ascendance of open, grassy environments. The Ha Long megafossil flora from the Dong Ho Formation of Oligocene age shows that the Oligocene flora of what is now Vietnam was very similar to its present flora.

Kelps make their first appearance in the fossil record during the earliest Oligocene.

=== Fauna ===
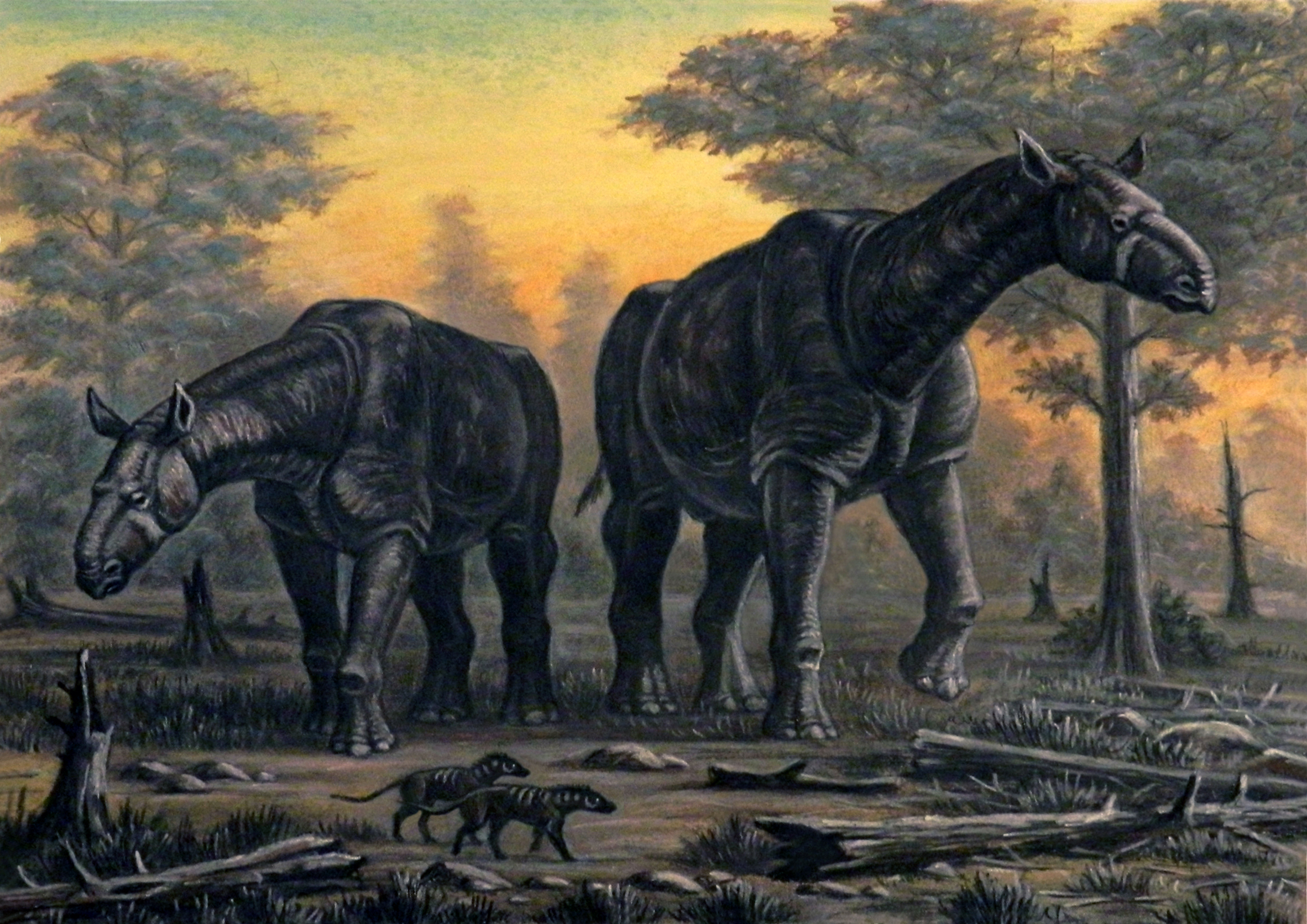
Paraceratherium restored next to Hyaenodon

Most extant mammal families had appeared by the end of the Oligocene. These included primitive three-toed horses, rhinoceroses, camels, deer, and peccaries. Carnivores such as dogs, nimravids, bears, weasels, and raccoons began to replace the creodonts that had dominated the Paleocene in the Old World. Rodents and rabbits underwent tremendous diversification due to the increase in suitable habitats for ground-dwelling seed eaters, as habitats for squirrel-like nut- and fruit-eaters diminished. The primates, once present in Eurasia, were reduced in range to Africa and South America. Many groups, such as equids, entelodonts, rhinos, merycoidodonts, and camelids, became more able to run during this time, adapting to the plains that were spreading as the Eocene rainforests receded. Brontotheres died out in the Earliest Oligocene, and creodonts died out outside Africa and the Middle East at the end of the period. Multituberculates, an ancient lineage of primitive mammals that originated back in the Jurassic, also became extinct in the Oligocene, aside from the gondwanatheres.

The Eocene-Oligocene transition in Europe and Asia has been characterized as the Grande Coupure. The lowering of sea levels closed the Turgai Strait across the Obik Sea, which had previously separated Asia from Europe. This allowed Asian mammals, such as rhinoceroses and ruminants, to enter Europe and drive endemic species to extinction. Lesser faunal turnovers occurred simultaneously with the Oi2 event and towards the end of the Oligocene. There was significant diversification of mammals in Eurasia, including the giant indricotheres, that grew up to 6 meters (20 ft) at the shoulder and weighed up to 20 tons. Paraceratherium was one of the largest land mammals ever to walk the Earth. However, the indricotheres were an exception to a general tendency for Oligocene mammals to be much smaller than their Eocene counterparts. The earliest deer, giraffes, pigs, and cattle appeared in the mid-Oligocene in Eurasia. The first felid, Proailurus, originated in Asia during the late Oligocene and spread to Europe.

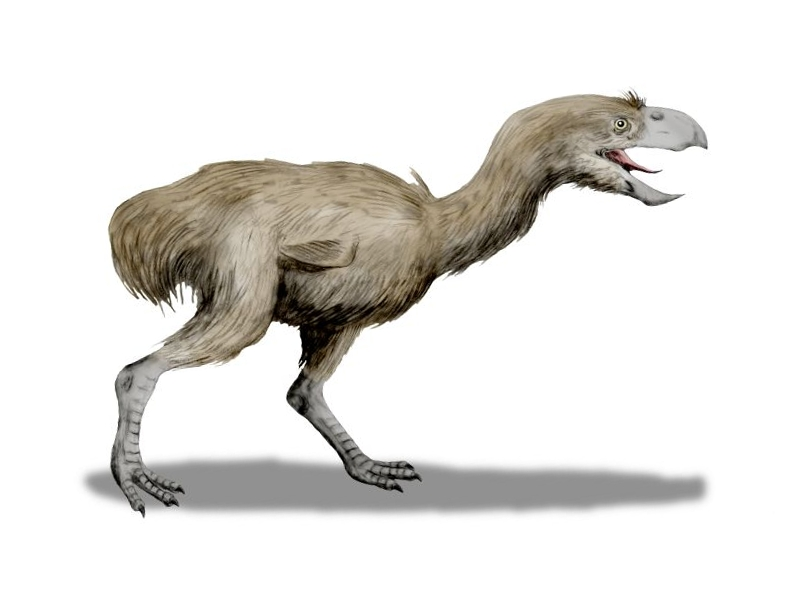
Life restoration of Paraphysornis

There was only limited migration between Asia and North America. The cooling of central North America at the Eocene-Oligocene transition resulted in a large turnover of gastropods, amphibians, and reptiles. Mammals were much less affected. Crocodilians and pond turtles replaced by dry land tortoises. Molluscs shifted to more drought-tolerant forms. The White River Fauna of central North America inhabited a semiarid prairie home and included entelodonts like Archaeotherium, camelids (such as Poebrotherium), running rhinoceratoids, three-toed equids (such as Mesohippus), nimravids, protoceratids, and early canids like Hesperocyon. Merycoidodonts, an endemic American group, were very diverse during this time.

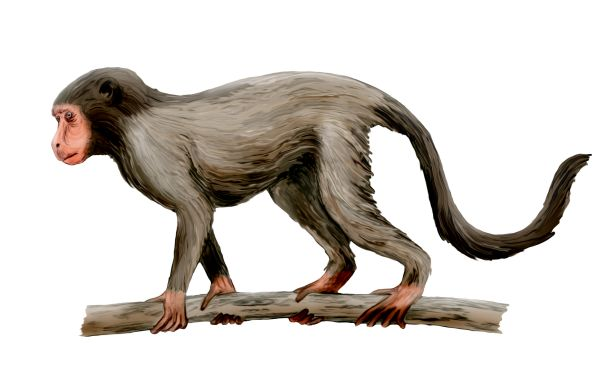
Aegyptopithecus is an early fossil catarrhine that predates the divergence between hominoids (apes) and Old World monkeys

Australia and South America became geographically isolated and developed their own distinctive endemic fauna. These included the New World and Old World monkeys. The South American continent was home to animals such as pyrotheres and astrapotheres, as well as litopterns and notoungulates. Sebecosuchians, terror birds, and carnivorous metatheres, like the borhyaenids remained the dominant predators.

Africa was also relatively isolated and retained its endemic fauna. These included mastodonts, hyraxes, arsinoitheres, and other archaic forms. Egypt in the Oligocene was an environment of lush forested deltas. Nevertheless, the Early Oligocene saw a major reduction in the diversity of many Afro-Arabian mammal clades, including hyaenodonts, primates, and hystricognath and anomaluroid rodents.

During the Oligocene, the Tethyan marine biodiversity hotspot collapsed as the Tethys Ocean contracted. The seas around Southeast Asia and Australia became the new dominant hotspot of marine biodiversity. At sea, 97% of marine snail species, 89% of clams, and 50% of echinoderms of the Gulf Coast did not survive past the earliest Oligocene. New species evolved, but the overall diversity diminished. Cold-water mollusks migrated around the Pacific Rim from Alaska and Siberia. The marine animals of Oligocene oceans resembled today's fauna, such as the bivalves. Calcareous cirratulids appeared in the Oligocene.

The Oligocene saw the emergence of parrotfishes, as the centre of marine biodiversity shifted from the Central Tethys eastward into the Indo-Pacific. The fossil record of marine mammals is a little spotty during this time, and not as well known as the Eocene or Miocene, but some fossils have been found. The baleen whales and toothed whales had just appeared, and their ancestors, the archaeocete cetaceans began to decrease in diversity due to their lack of echolocation, which was very useful as the water became colder and cloudier. Other factors to their decline could include climate changes and competition with today's modern cetaceans and the requiem sharks, which also appeared in this epoch. Early desmostylians, like Behemotops, are known from the Oligocene. Pinnipeds appeared near the end of the epoch from an otter-like ancestor.

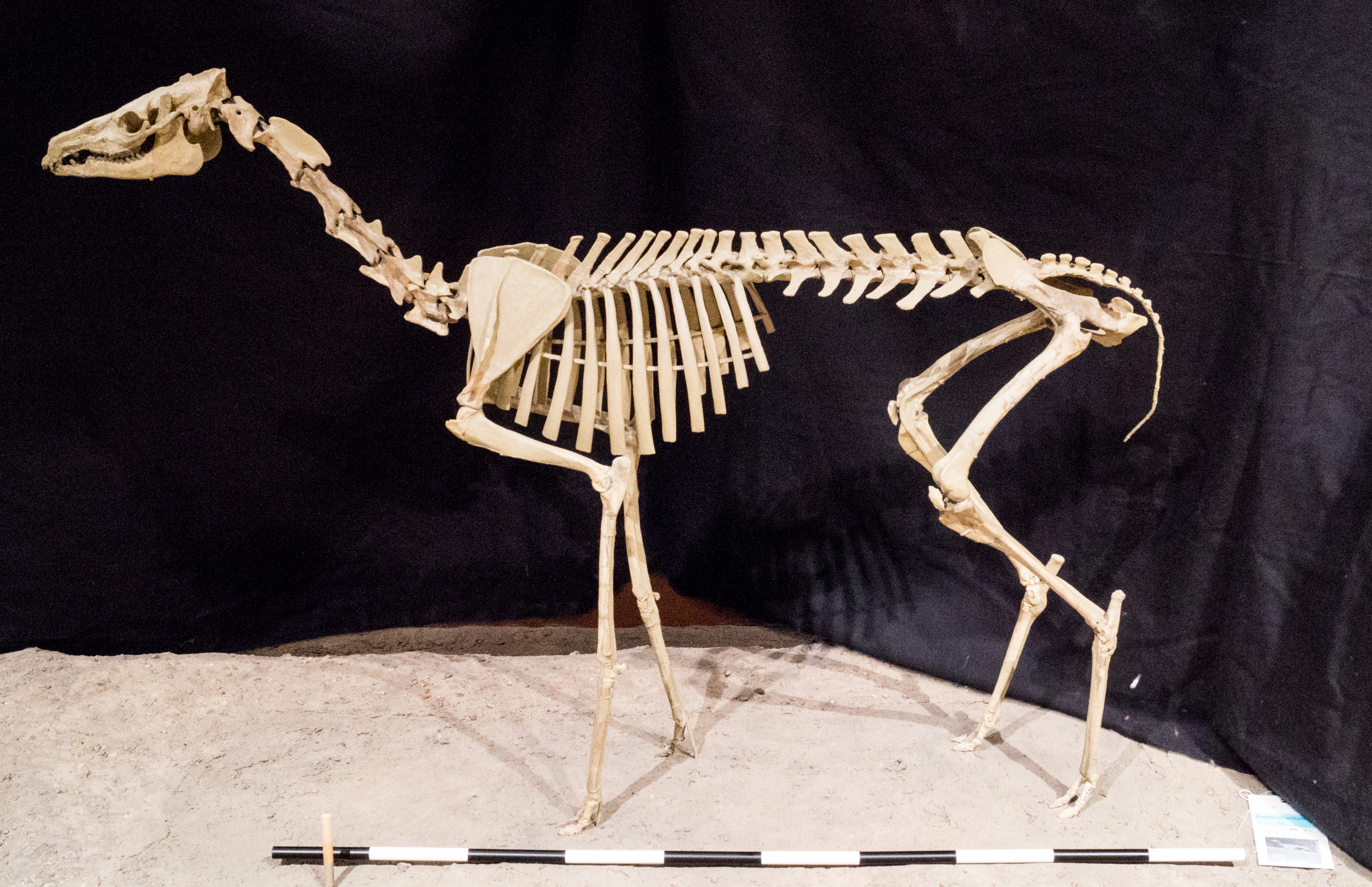
Poebrotherium

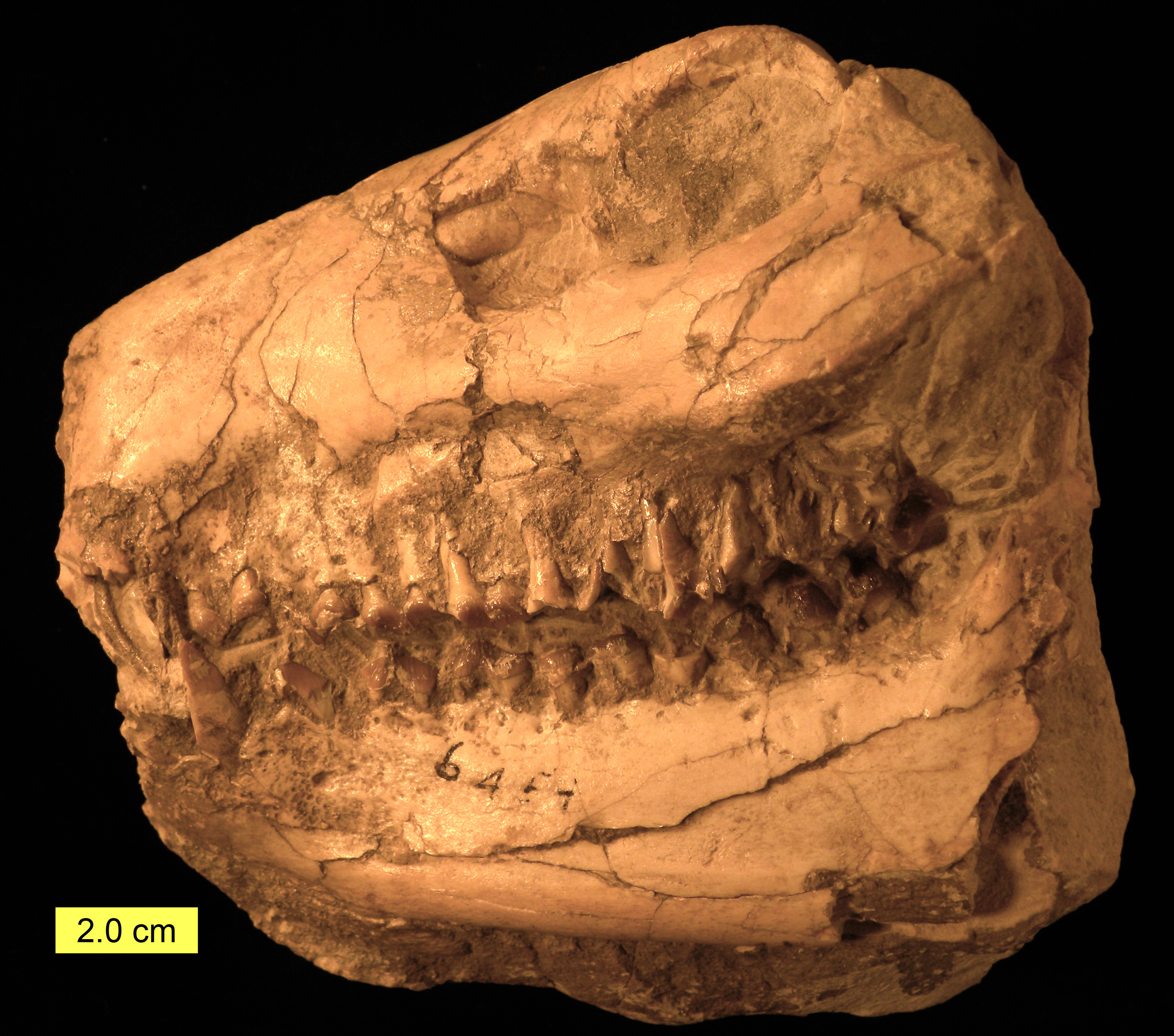
Merycoidodon

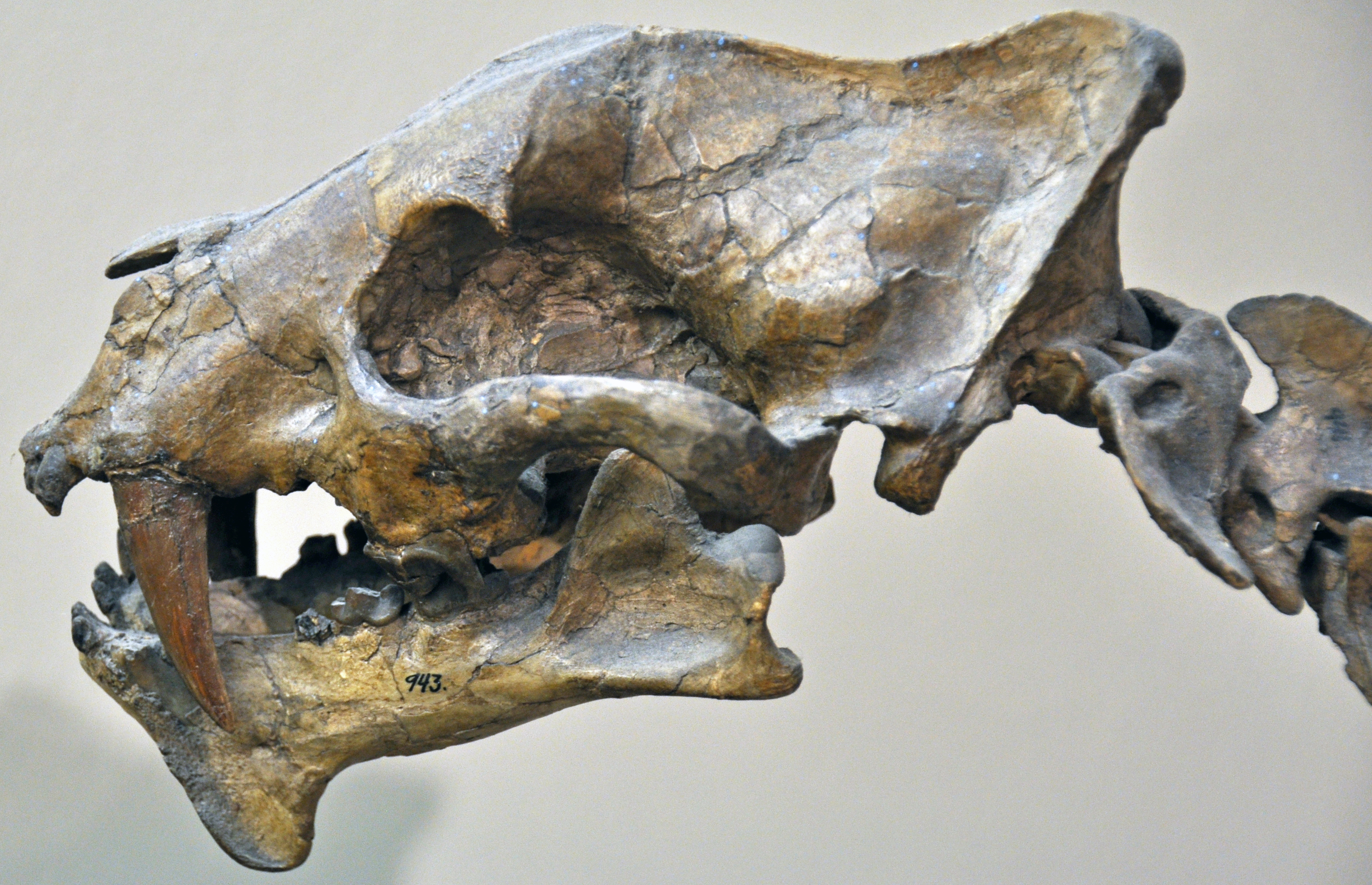
Hoplophoneus

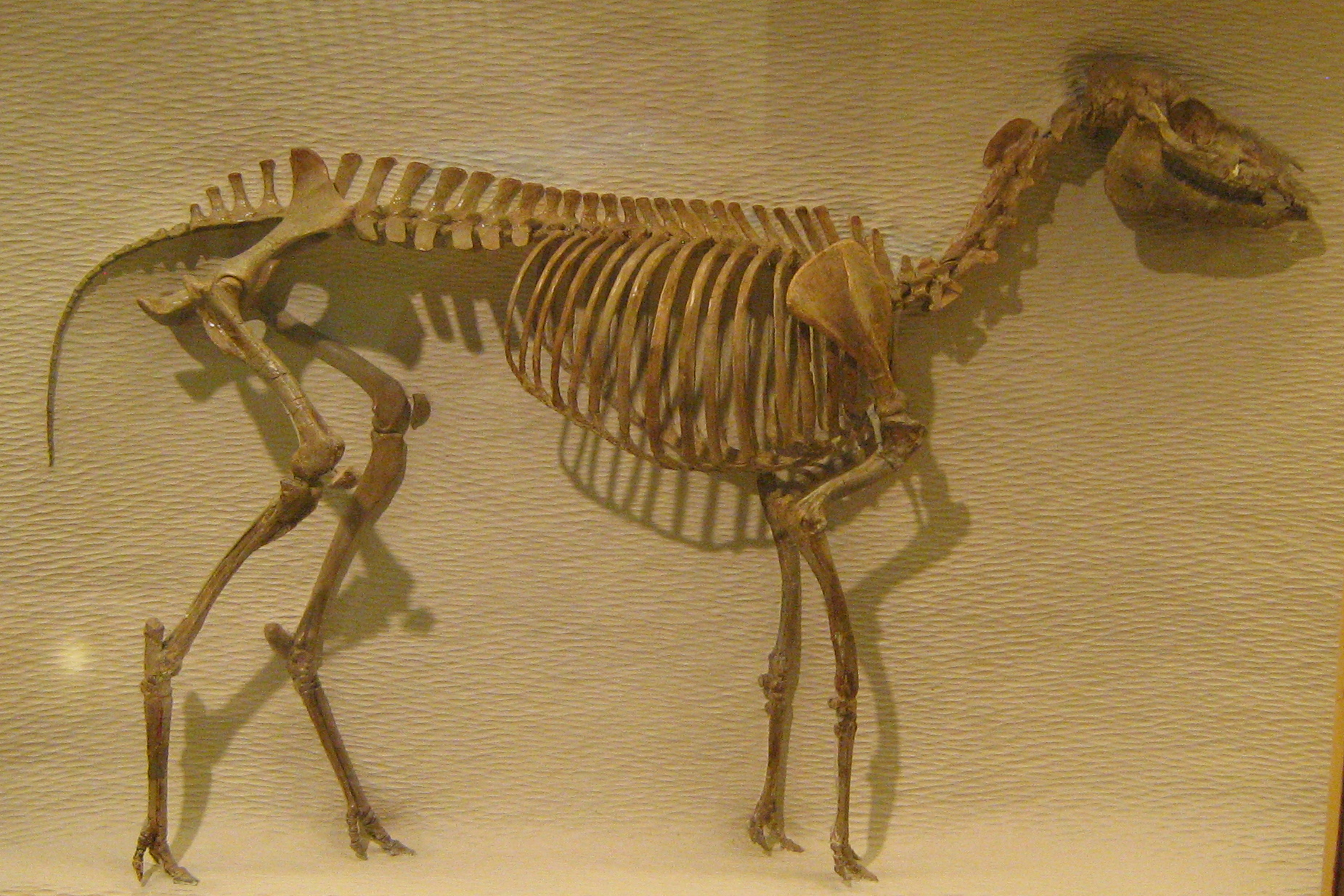
Mesohippus

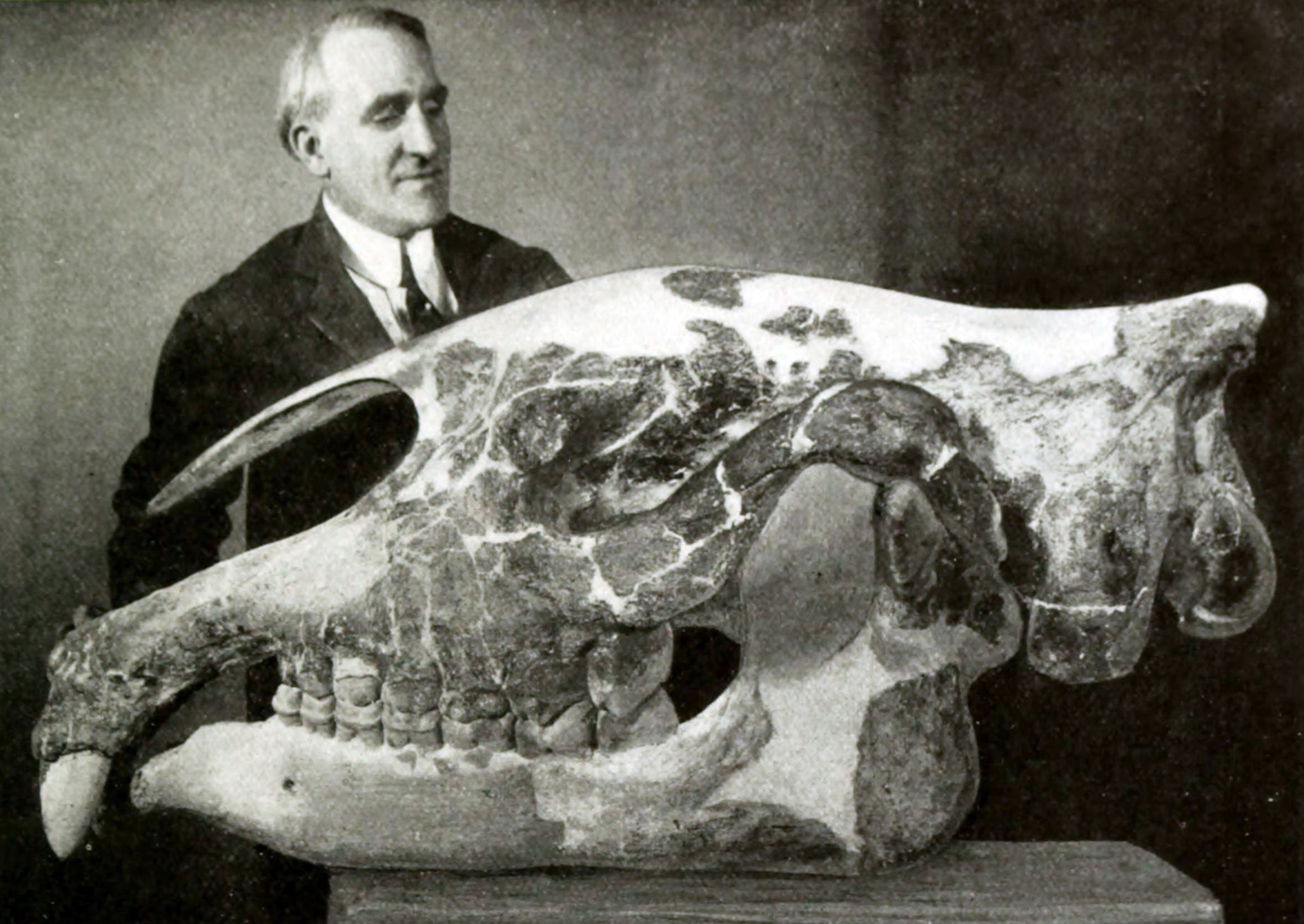
Paraceratherium

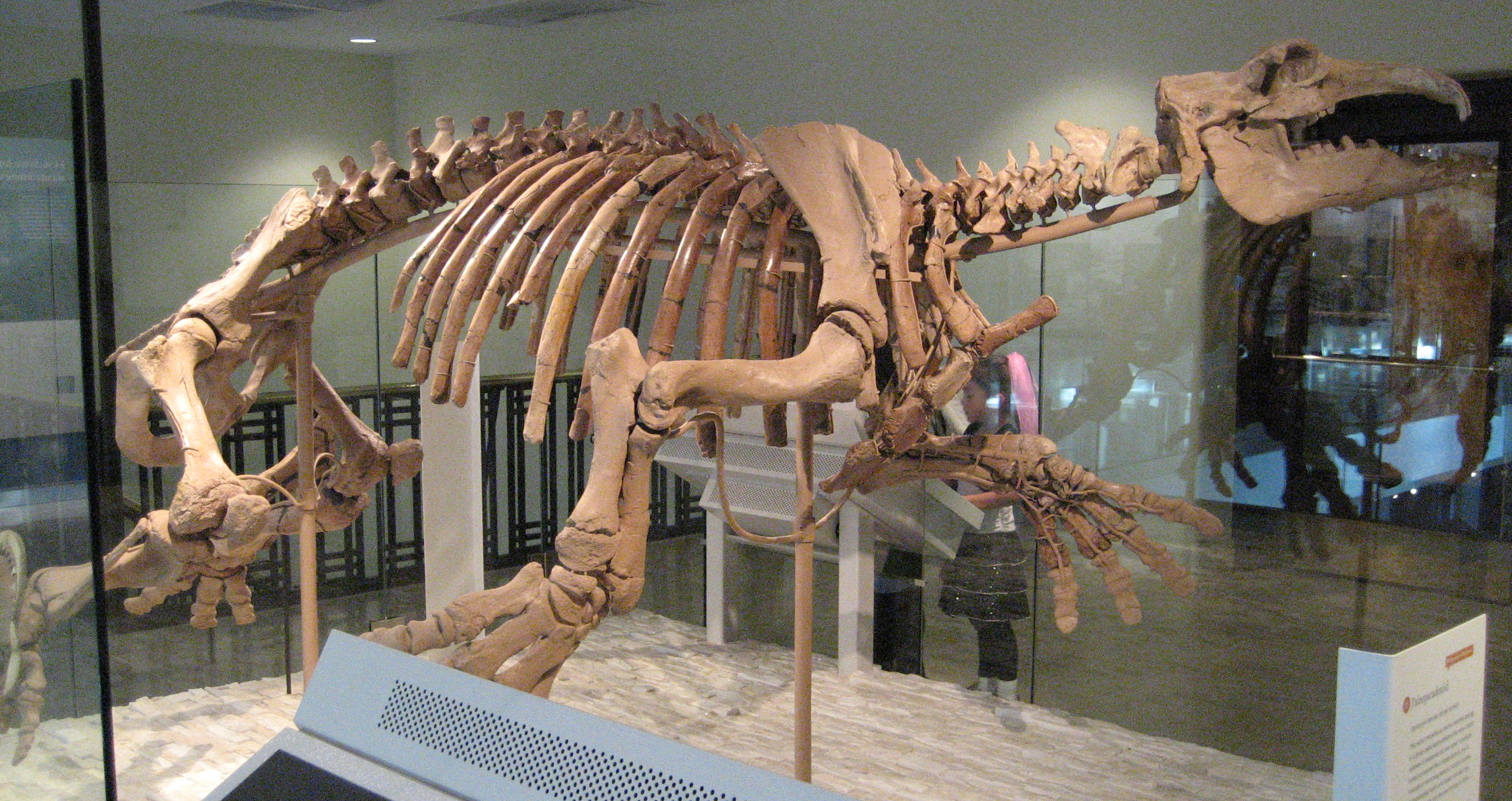
Paleoparadoxia

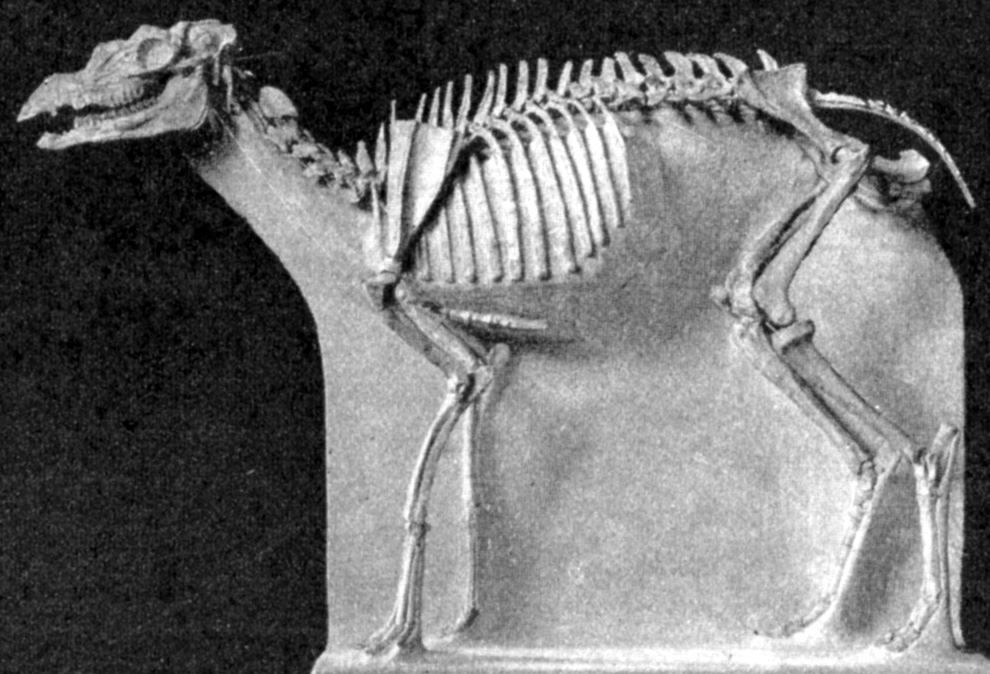
Protoceras

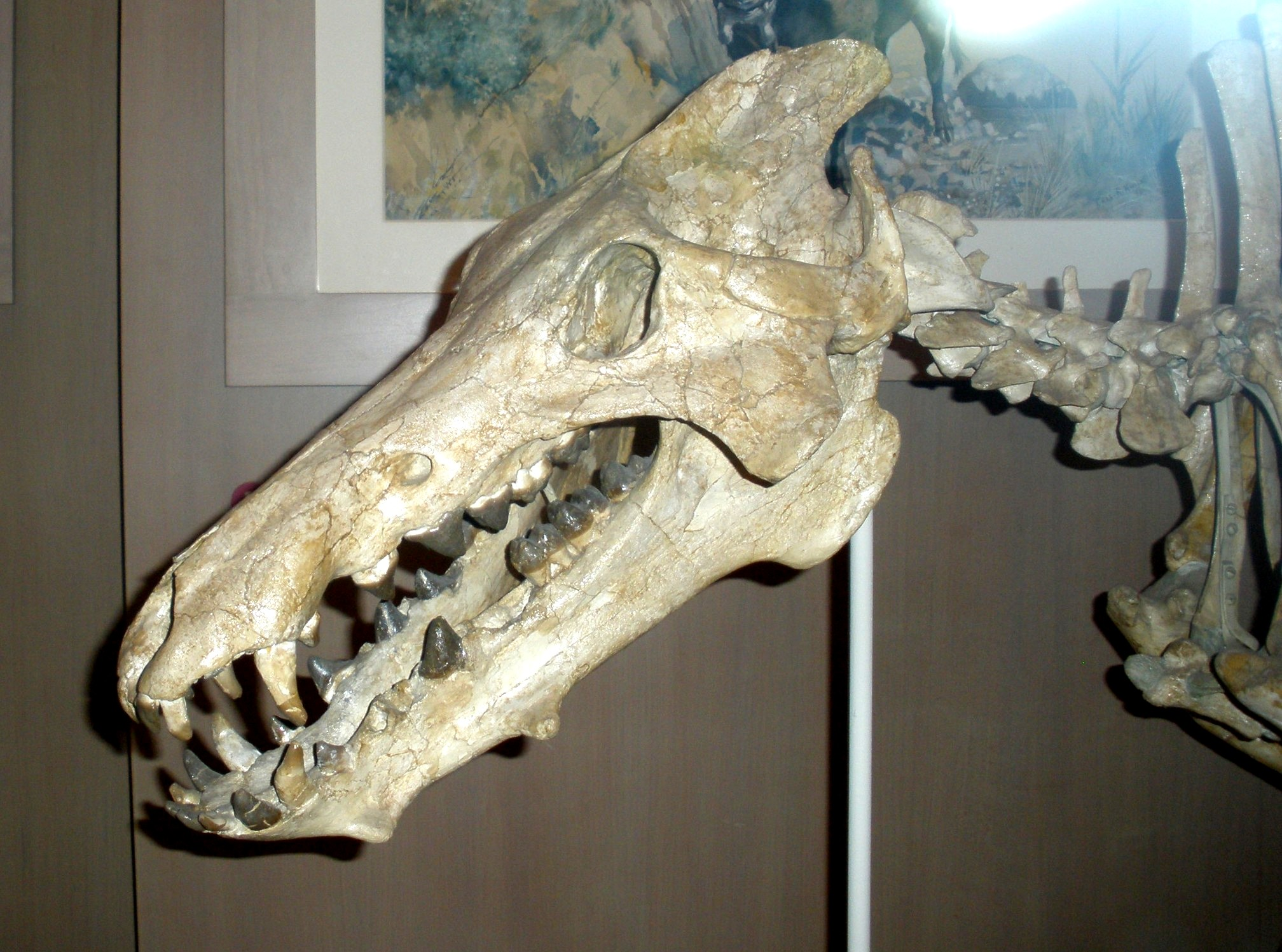
Archaeotherium

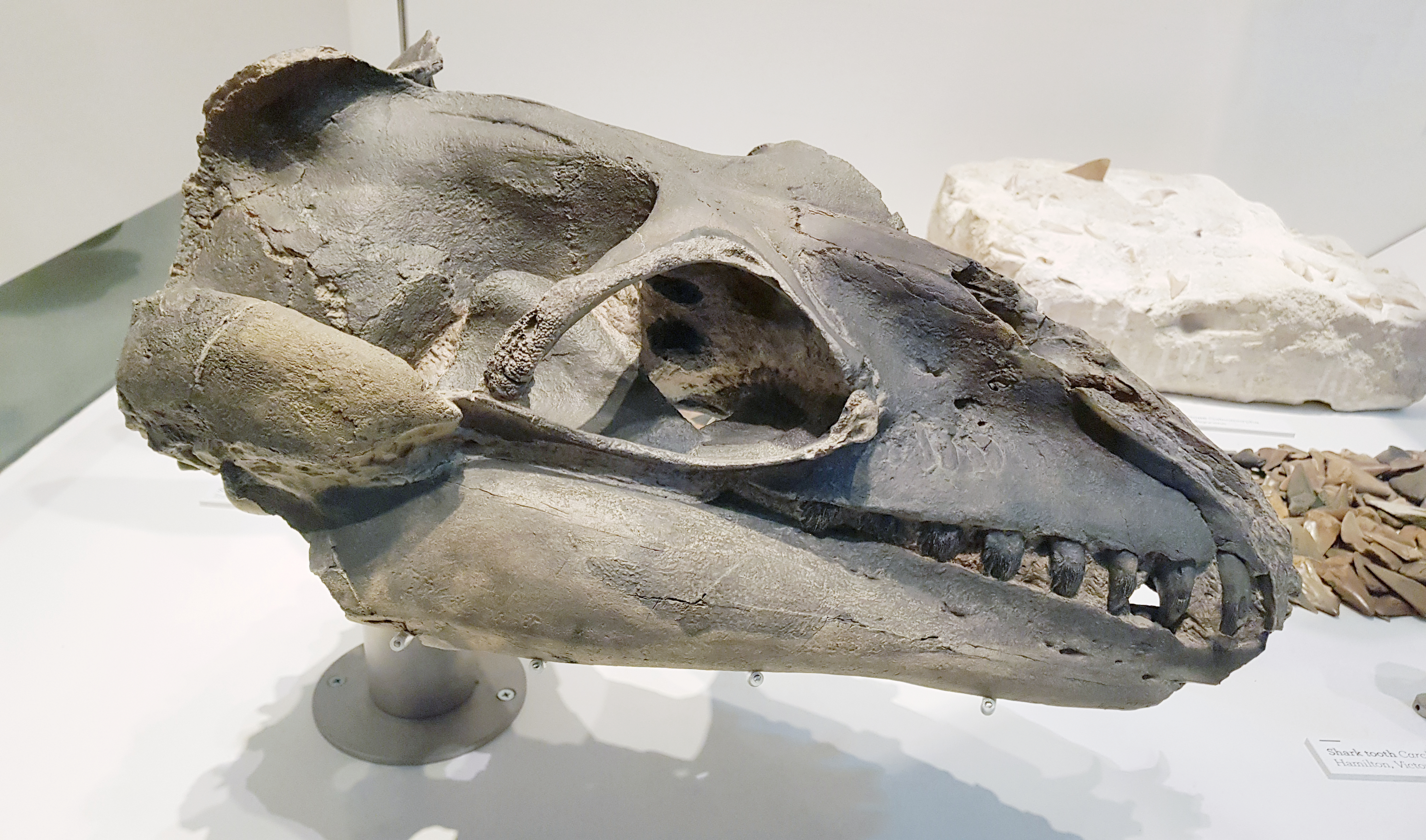
Janjucetus

==== Land mammal ages ====
Cenozoic mammal faunas are often described using biochronological or biostratigraphic systems, which arrange rock strata or intervals of time based on distinctive fossil assemblages or the evolution of new mammal species. Apart from Antarctica, each continent has a unique series of Cenozoic land mammal ages (LMAs) overprinted on the global geological time scale. These different land mammal ages are listed in the following table, which shows rough correlations to each other and the two global ages/stages of the Oligocene:

Global age	NALMA (North America)	SALMA (South America)	ELMA / MP (Europe)	ALMA (Asia)	AFLMA (Africa)	(Australia)
Chattian	Arikareean	Deseadan	Arvernian (MP 30-26)	Tabenbulakian	Turkwelian	Wipajirian
Chattian	Arikareean	Deseadan	Arvernian (MP 30-26)	Tabenbulakian	Turkwelian	Etadunnan
Chattian	Arikareean	Deseadan	Suevian (MP 21-25)	Tabenbulakian	Turkwelian	Etadunnan
Chattian	Arikareean	Deseadan	Suevian (MP 21-25)	Tabenbulakian	Qatranian	Etadunnan
Rupelian	Arikareean	Deseadan	Suevian (MP 21-25)	Tabenbulakian	Qatranian	Etadunnan
Rupelian	Whitneyan	Deseadan	Suevian (MP 21-25)	Tabenbulakian	Qatranian	"pre-Etadunnan"
Rupelian	Whitneyan	Tinguirirican	Suevian (MP 21-25)	Hsandagolian	Qatranian	"pre-Etadunnan"
Rupelian	Orellan	Tinguirirican	Suevian (MP 21-25)	Hsandagolian	Qatranian	"pre-Etadunnan"

== Oceans ==
The Oligocene sees the beginnings of modern ocean circulation, with tectonic shifts causing the opening and closing of ocean gateways. Cooling of the oceans had already commenced by the Eocene/Oligocene boundary, and they continued to cool as the Oligocene progressed. The formation of permanent Antarctic ice sheets during the early Oligocene and possible glacial activity in the Arctic may have influenced this oceanic cooling, though the extent of this influence is still a matter of some significant dispute.

=== Effects of oceanic gateways on circulation ===
The opening and closing of ocean gateways: the opening of the Drake Passage; the opening of the Tasmanian Gateway and the closing of the Tethys seaway; along with the final formation of the Greenland–Iceland–Faroes Ridge; played vital parts in reshaping oceanic currents during the Oligocene. As the continents shifted to a more modern configuration, so too did ocean circulation.

==== Drake Passage ====
Eocene-Oligocene circum-Antarctic oceanic changes

The Drake Passage is located between South America and Antarctica. Once the Tasmanian Gateway between Australia and Antarctica opened, all that kept Antarctica from being completely isolated by the Southern Ocean was its connection to South America. As the South American continent moved north, the Drake Passage opened and enabled the formation of the Antarctic Circumpolar Current (ACC), which would have kept the cold waters of Antarctica circulating around that continent and strengthened the formation of Antarctic Bottom Water (ABW). With the cold water concentrated around Antarctica, sea surface temperatures and, consequently, continental temperatures would have dropped. The onset of Antarctic glaciation occurred during the early Oligocene, and the effect of the Drake Passage opening on this glaciation has been the subject of much research. However, some controversy still exists as to the exact timing of the passage opening, whether it occurred at the start of the Oligocene or nearer the end. Even so, many theories agree that at the Eocene/Oligocene (E/O) boundary, a yet shallow flow existed between South America and Antarctica, permitting the start of an Antarctic Circumpolar Current.

Stemming from the issue of when the opening of the Drake Passage took place, is the dispute over how great of an influence the opening of the Drake Passage had on the global climate. While early researchers concluded that the advent of the ACC was highly important, perhaps even the trigger, for Antarctic glaciation and subsequent global cooling, other studies have suggested that the δ^{18}O signature is too strong for glaciation to be the main trigger for cooling. Through study of Pacific Ocean sediments, other researchers have shown that the transition from warm Eocene ocean temperatures to cool Oligocene ocean temperatures took only 300,000 years, which strongly implies that feedbacks and factors other than the ACC were integral to the rapid cooling.

The latest hypothesized time for the opening of the Drake Passage is during the early Miocene. Despite the shallow flow between South America and Antarctica, there was not enough of a deep water opening to allow for significant flow to create a true Antarctic Circumpolar Current. If the opening occurred as late as hypothesized, then the Antarctic Circumpolar Current could not have had much of an effect on early Oligocene cooling, as it would not have existed.

The earliest hypothesized time for the opening of the Drake Passage is around 30 Ma. One of the possible issues with this timing was the continental debris cluttering up the seaway between the two plates in question. This debris, along with what is known as the Shackleton fracture zone, has been shown in a recent study to be fairly young, only about 8 million years old. The study concludes that the Drake Passage would be free to allow significant deep water flow by around 31 Ma. This would have facilitated an earlier onset of the Antarctic Circumpolar Current. There is some evidence that it occurred much earlier, during the early Eocene.

==== Opening of the Tasman Gateway ====
The other major oceanic gateway opening during this time was the Tasman, or Tasmanian, depending on the paper, gateway between Australia and Antarctica. The time frame for this opening is less disputed than the Drake Passage and is largely considered to have occurred around 34 Ma. As the gateway widened, the Antarctic Circumpolar Current strengthened.

==== Tethys Seaway closing ====
The Tethys Seaway was not a gateway, but rather a sea in its own right. Its closing during the Oligocene had significant impact on both ocean circulation and climate. The collisions of the African plate with the European plate and of the Indian subcontinent with the Asian plate, cut off the Tethys Seaway that had provided a low-latitude ocean circulation. The closure of Tethys built some new mountains (the Zagros range) and drew down more carbon dioxide from the atmosphere, contributing to global cooling.

==== Greenland–Iceland–Faroes ====
The gradual separation of the clump of continental crust and the deepening of the tectonic ridge in the North Atlantic that would become Greenland, Iceland, and the Faroe Islands helped to increase the deep water flow in that area. More information about the evolution of North Atlantic Deep Water will be given a few sections down.

=== Ocean cooling ===
Evidence for ocean-wide cooling during the Oligocene exists mostly in isotopic proxies. Patterns of extinction and patterns of species migration can also be studied to gain insight into ocean conditions. For a while, it was thought that the glaciation of Antarctica may have significantly contributed to the cooling of the ocean, however, recent evidence tends to deny this.

=== Deep water ===
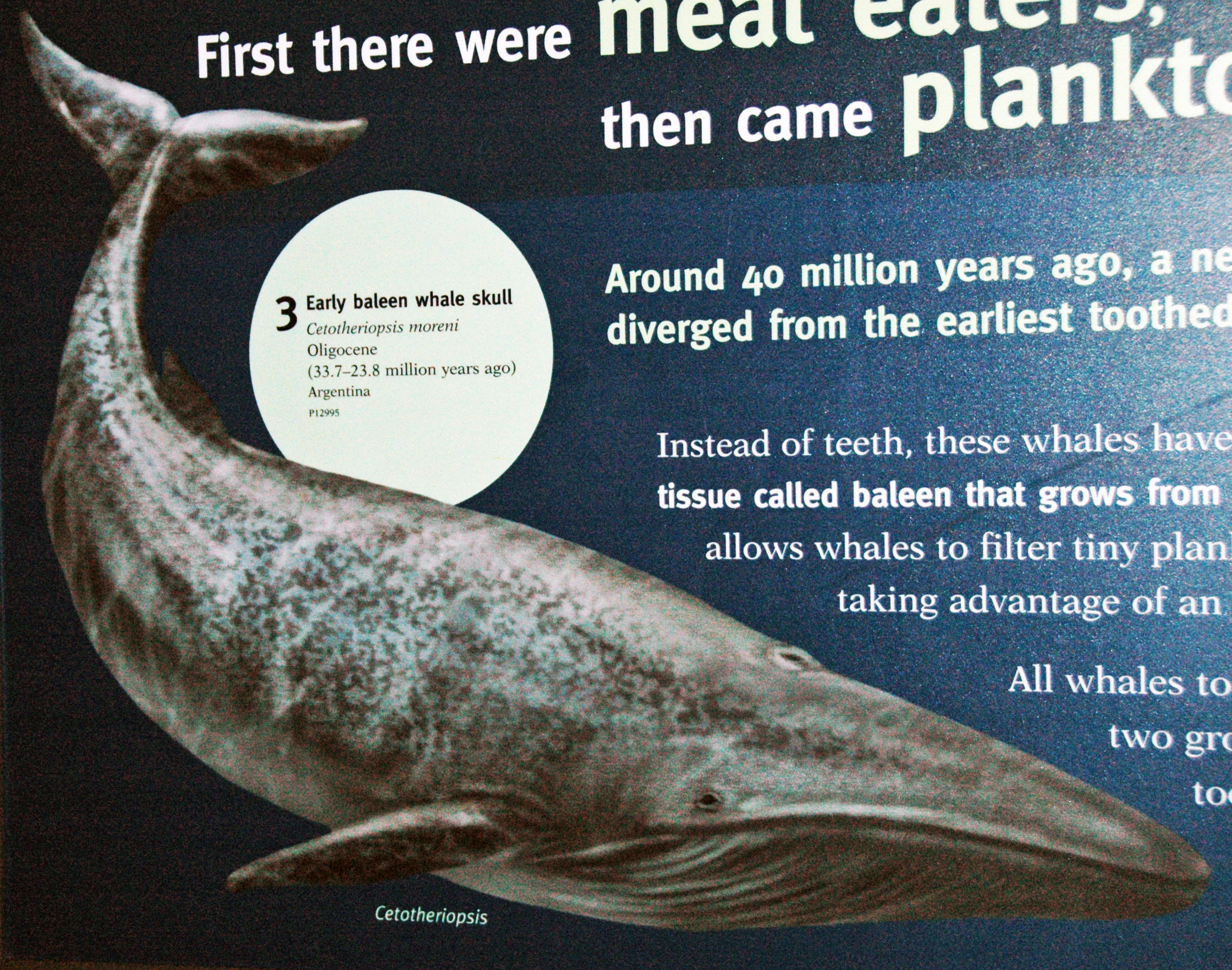
Reconstruction of Aglaocetus moreni

Isotopic evidence suggests that during the early Oligocene, the main source of deep water was the North Pacific and the Southern Ocean. As the Greenland-Iceland-Faroe Ridge sank and thereby connected the Norwegian–Greenland sea with the Atlantic Ocean, the deep water of the North Atlantic began to come into play as well. Computer models suggest that once this occurred, a more modern in appearance thermo-haline circulation started.

Evidence for the early Oligocene onset of chilled North Atlantic deep water lies in the beginnings of sediment drift deposition in the North Atlantic, such as the Feni and Southeast Faroe drifts.

The chilling of the South Ocean deep water began in earnest once the Tasmanian Gateway and the Drake Passage opened fully. Regardless of the time at which the opening of the Drake Passage occurred, the effect on the cooling of the Southern Ocean would have been the same.

== Impact events ==
Recorded extraterrestrial impacts:

- Haughton impact crater, Nunavut, Canada (23 Ma, crater 24 km (15 mi) diameter; now considered questionable as an Oligocene event; later analyses have concluded the crater dates to 39 Ma, placing the event in the Eocene.)

== Supervolcanic explosions ==
- La Garita Caldera (28–26 million years ago)
- Wah Wah Springs Caldera (30 million years ago)

== See also ==
- List of fossil sites (with link directory)
- Turgai Sea
