= Azibius =

Azibius Temporal range: Early to Middle Eocene

Scientific classification
- Domain: Eukaryota
- Kingdom: Animalia
- Phylum: Chordata
- Class: Mammalia
- Order: Primates
- Suborder: Strepsirrhini
- Family: †Azibiidae
- Genus: †Azibius; Sudre, 1975
- Species: †A. trerki

Binomial name
- †Azibius trerki Sudre, 1975

Synonyms
- Genus: Dralestes Tabuce et al. 2004; Tabelia Godinot & Mahboubi 1994; Species: Dralestes hammadaensis Tabuce et al. 2004; Tabelia hammadae Godinot & Mahboubi 1994

Extinct genus of primates

Azibius is an extinct genus of fossil primate from the late early or early middle Eocene from the Glib Zegdou Formation in the Gour Lazib area of Algeria. They are thought to be related to the living toothcombed primates, the lemurs and lorisoids (known as strepsirrhines), although paleoanthropologists such as Marc Godinot have argued that they may be early simians (monkeys and apes). Originally described as a type of plesiadapiform (an extinct group of arboreal mammals considered to be a sister group to the primate clade), its fragmentary remains have been interpreted as a hyopsodontid (a type of extinct condylarth), an adapid (an extinct type of adapiform primate from Europe), and a macroscelidid (elephant shrews). Less fragmentary remains discovered between 2003 and 2009 demonstrated a close relationship between Azibius and Algeripithecus, a fossil primate once thought to be the oldest known simian. Descriptions of the talus (ankle bone) in 2011 have helped to strengthen support for the strepsirrhine status of Azibius and Algeripithecus, which would indicate that the evolutionary history of lemurs and their kin is rooted in Africa.

Azibius trerki is the only named species, although a few teeth and a talus (ankle bone) of a larger, unnamed species (cf. Azibius sp.) have also been found. A. trerki is estimated to have weighed 115 to 160 g (4.1 to 5.6 oz), while cf. Azibius sp. was larger, weighing approximately 630 to 920 g (22 to 32 oz). Based on the fragmentary fossils, both are thought to have been nocturnal and agile arboreal quadrupeds.

== Evolutionary history and taxonomy ==
For years following its discovery, Azibius was difficult to classify. Originally described by Jean Sudre in 1975 as a possible 'paromomyiform' (a type of plesiadapiform), A. trerki was also interpreted as a hyopsodontid by paleoanthropologist Frederick S. Szalay that same year. The following year, paleoanthropologist Philip D. Gingerich reclassified it as an adapid. Throughout the 1990s and 2000s, debates over its classification continued, with some researchers suggesting it might be related to macroscelidids (elephant shrews), while others supported initial interpretations as adapids or plesiadapiforms (particularly carpolestids).

In 2006, paleoanthropologist Marc Godinot favored a relationship between Azibius and simians, but tentatively suggested Azibius may be more closely related to toothcombed primates, which include all extant strepsirrhines. This latter view has gained increasing support with the reclassification of Algeripithecus (once considered a basal simian) as a closely related azibiid. The mandible of Algeripithecus indicates it had an inclined canine tooth, similar to that found in toothcombed primates. Although the anterior dentition of azibiids is unknown, they may have possessed a toothcomb, indicating an ancient stem lineage of lemuriform primates in Africa, possibly descended from an early Asian branch of adapiforms such as a primitive branch of cercamoniines predating Donrussellia (one of the oldest European adapiforms).

Tabelia hammadae, which was also considered to be one of the oldest known simians along with Algeripithecus, was shown to be a synonym of Azibius when more complete fossils were discovered at Gour Lazib between 2003 and 2009. Likewise, the second upper molar (M^{2}) of Dralestes hammadaensis have been reinterpreted as being the upper fourth premolar (P^{4}) of Azibius and has been considered a synonym. However, in 2010, Godinot cautiously suggested that Dralestes may be a synonym of Algeripithecus based on a blade-like premolar. He also reasserted his view that Algeripithecus was a simian based on its upper molar morphology and hypothesized that this applied to all azibiids, favoring his earlier view that they may be early simians instead of stem lemuriforms. In 2011, Marivaux et al. published an interpretation of recently discovered talus bones (Note: Talus bones are commonly used to taxonomically differentiate simians from "prosimian" primates in the fossil record.) found at Gour Lazib, which they claimed were more similar to those of living strepsirrhines and extinct adapiforms, not simians, thus reinforcing the strepsirrhine status favored by Tabuce et al. two years earlier. The tali morphology also differed radically from those of plesiadapiforms, confirming that azibiids are true primates.

Remains of a second, unnamed species of Azibius, cf. Azibius sp., have been discovered in the HGL-50 layer at Gour Lazib. It is known for a few upper and lower teeth. These teeth are three times larger than those of A. trerki. A larger right talus has also been found, and is assumed to belong to this new species.

== Anatomy and physiology ==
All known azibiids were small-bodied primates. A. trerki is estimated (Note: Size estimates were calculated using regressions of the area of the first molar compared to living primates.) to have weighed between 115 and 160 g (4.1 and 5.6 oz), nearly twice the weight of the only other named azibiid, Algeripithecus, and was comparable in size to a gray mouse lemur (Microcebus murinus). The unnamed species, cf. Azibius sp., is estimated to have weighed 630 to 920 g (22 to 32 oz) and been comparable in size to a sportive lemur (Lepilemur).

Azibius also had a short rostrum and very large orbits.

== Distribution ==
Azibius has only been found in the Glib Zegdou Formation of the Gour Lazib area in southwest Algeria. The Glib Zegdou Formation dates to the late early or early middle Eocene, particularly the late Ypresian or early Lutetian.

== Behavior ==
Judging from the properties of its talus, Azibius was probably an arboreal quadruped, capable of leaping and climbing in trees, very similar to living cheirogaleid lemurs. Based on what can be inferred from the maxillary remains, Azibius is thought to have had large eyes and extra vibrissae, which suggests it was nocturnal.
