= Djebelemur =

Djebelemur Temporal range: Late Early or Early Middle Eocene

Scientific classification
- Kingdom: Animalia
- Phylum: Chordata
- Class: Mammalia
- Order: Primates
- Suborder: Strepsirrhini
- Family: †Djebelemuridae
- Genus: †Djebelemur; Hartenberger & Marandat, 1992
- Species: †D. martinezi

Binomial name
- †Djebelemur martinezi Hartenberger & Marandat, 1992

Extinct genus of primates

Djebelemur is an extinct genus of early strepsirrhine primate from the late early or early middle Eocene period from the Chambi locality in Tunisia. Although they probably lacked a toothcomb, a specialized dental structure found in living lemuriforms (lemurs and lorisoids), they are thought to be a related stem group. The one recognized species, Djebelemur martinezi, was very small, approximately 100 g (3.5 oz).

Djebelemur is one of five genera of djebelemurids, others including 'Anchomomys' milleri, a fossil primate formerly thought to be related to other members of the genus Anchomomys, a group of Eocene European adapiform primates. Following its discovery and description in 1992, Djebelemur was thought to be either a relative of European adapiforms or an early simian, mostly due to the fragmentary nature of the lower jaw and two isolated upper molars that may not belong with the jaw. By 2006, it was viewed as a stem lemuriform.

== Etymology ==
The name "Djebelemur" derives from the mountainous outcrops in which the first specimens were found: Arabic djebel means "mountain". The species was named in honor of geologist C. Martinez, who was the guide and host for the field party that made the discovery.

== Evolutionary history ==
The fragmentary remains of Djebelemur martinezi are morphologically similar to those of 'Anchomomys' milleri, (Note: In 2006, Godinot noted that 'Anchomomys' milleri requires a new generic designation because it does not belong in the genus Anchomomys, which contains cercamoniine adapiforms found in Europe. Both djebelemurids share more characteristics—and therefore share a close phylogenetic relationship—with African lemuriforms than Eocene European cercamoniines.) a fossil primate originally described as a type of cercamoniine (early adapiforms found in the northern continents). Despite significant differences in age, with D. martinezi dating to the late early or early middle Eocene (~52–46 million years ago) and 'A.' milleri dating to the late Eocene (36 million years ago), they form a clade and are both grouped under the family Djebelemuridae.

Djebelemurids appear to be a primitive sister group to lemuriforms and the more closely related Plesiopithecus, all of which form an Afro-Arabian clade that excludes the adapids or notharctids from the northern continents. Both are considered stem lemuriforms because despite sharing a number of traits, it is suspected that they lacked a toothcomb, a dental feature unique to lemuriforms.

General phylogeny of strepsirrhines

- Primates
  - Haplorhines
    - - - Simians (monkeys, apes, & humans)
        - Tarsiers
    - †Omomyiforms
  - Strepsirrhines
    - †Adapiforms
    - - †Azibiids
      - - †Djebelemurids
        - - †Plesiopithecus
          - Lemuriforms (lemurs, lorises, and galagos)

An Afro-Arabian clade of early strepsirrhines is thought to have given rise modern lemurs, lorises, and galagos. Azibiid taxonomy is still disputed.

The confirmed presence of djebelemurids in Eocene Africa is important because it proves that lemuriforms evolved their toothcomb in Africa and differentiated there. This Afro-Arabian clade of stem lemuriforms are thought to have arrived in Africa too early to have descended from the Holarctic adapiforms. All dental similarities between the Afro-Arabian clade and European anchomomyins may be due to convergent evolution because the traits appear in the early Eocene (Ypresian stage) in the relatively poor fossil record of Africa long before they appear in the fossil-rich deposits of Europe during the mid-Lutetian. This ancient stem lineage of lemuriform primates in Africa possibly descended from an early Asian branch of adapiforms such as a primitive branch of cercamoniines predating Donrussellia (one of the oldest European adapiforms).

=== Taxonomy ===
Djebelemur martinezi was first described in 1992 by Hartenberger and Marandat. The description was based on a lower jaw fragment and two isolated upper molars found in Tunisia at the Chambi locality, which date to the late early or early middle Eocene. It was described as an adapiform, possibly related to the cercamoniine branch, with the informal suggestion that it might merit its own subfamily, "Djebelemurinae". This interpretation was based on their support of the hypothesis favored by paleoanthropologist Philip D. Gingerich and others that simians (monkeys, apes, and humans) were descended from African adapids, which in turn were descended from the adapids of Europe. They based their assumptions of simian relations on the two isolated upper molars, which are now seen as being incompatible with the lower dentition on the jaw. The upper molars were highly bunodont (having cusps that are separate and rounded)—a trait seen in simians—whereas the lower molars were crested. No definitive upper teeth for Djebelemur are known, but could yield surprises if found.

In 1994, paleoanthropologist Marc Godinot described Djebelemur as an early simian, along with Algeripithecus, once considered a basal simian, but now considered to be a distant stem lemuriform (lemurs and lorisoids). Godinot saw similarities between Djebelemur and early simians, as well as cercamoniines, but also noted issues of premolar and molar compaction that set it apart from European adapiforms. In 1997, Hartenberger continued to favor adapiform affinities, while in 1998, Godinot considered affinities with lemuriforms ("crown strepsirrhines") while still favoring simian affinities, particularly with oligopithecids. By 2006, Godinot accepted Djebelemur as a stem lemuriform, admitting that he was misled by the lack of a toothcomb—a distinguishing dental feature of living lemuriform primates—despite other dental similarities. He also noted that the lower molars of lemuriforms and simians can be difficult to distinguish. As of 2010, Djebelemur is still considered a stem lemuriform in the family Djebelemuridae, although its infraorder is unnamed.

== Anatomy and physiology ==
Djebelemur martinezi was a tiny primate, weighing approximately 100 g (3.5 oz). It was thought to lack a toothcomb since its canine teeth were only moderately reduced.

== Palaeobiology ==
=== Diet ===
The dental microwear patterns of D. martinezi reveal that it was mainly insectivorous. Dental topographic analysis also suggests that it would have consumed insects to supplement its otherwise gummivorous and frugivorous diet. The shearing quotient of the M_{2} of D. martinezi also indicates its molars were well adapted for insectivory, much more so than the azibiid primates it was coeval with, whose shearing quotients indicate they were frugivorous. The very small body mass of D. martinezi, about 60 to 80 g, would have precluded it from including leaves in its diet in line with Kay's Threshold.

=== Locomotion ===
Based on the right petrosal ONM-CBI-1-569, likely referrable to Djebelemur, show that the variance of the plane of its semicircular canals from orthogonality was approximately 26.09°. This value falls close to that of extant mouse lemur species and suggests that Djebelemur had a similar biomechanical capability of rapid head rotation as living cheirogaleids. However, there is a possibility that this petrosal may instead belong to Algeripithecus, making these conclusions about Djebelemur not definitive.

A talus attributed to Djebelemur, ONM-CBI-1-545, exhibits several features characteristic of leaping primates, including a strong and well developed posterior trochlear shelf and a long and proximally narrowing talar neck whose medial deflection from the talar body was minimal. Because the plantar ectal facet had a small radius of curvature, the subtalar range of motion was more akin to that of generalised arboreally quadrupedal primates than that of leapers. The talar trochlea of this specimen also did not have the rim sharpness typical of highly specialised leapers, and it only exhibited modest grooving. These features suggest that Djebelemur had a locomotory pattern intermediate between leapers and arboreal quadrupeds.
