= Azibiidae =

Azibiidae Temporal range: 52–46 Ma Early to Middle Eocene

Scientific classification
- Kingdom: Animalia
- Phylum: Chordata
- Class: Mammalia
- Order: Primates
- Suborder: Strepsirrhini
- Infraorder: incertae sedis
- Family: †Azibiidae; Gingerich, 1976

Genera
- Algeripithecus Godinot & Mahboubi, 1992; Azibius Sudre, 1975

Extinct family of primates

Azibiidae is an extinct family of fossil primate from the late early or early middle Eocene from the Glib Zegdou Formation in the Gour Lazib area of Algeria. They are thought to be related to the living toothcombed primates, the lemurs and lorisoids (known as strepsirrhines), although paleoanthropologists such as Marc Godinot have argued that they may be early simians (monkeys and apes). It includes the genera Azibius and Algeripithecus, the latter of which was originally considered the oldest known simian, not a strepsirrhine.

Originally described as a type of plesiadapiform (an extinct group of arboreal mammals considered to be a sister group to the primate clade), its fragmentary remains have been interpreted as a hyopsodontid (a type of extinct condylarth), an adapid (an extinct type of adapiform primate from Europe), and a macroscelidid (elephant shrews). Less fragmentary remains discovered between 2003 and 2009 demonstrated a close relationship between Azibius and Algeripithecus. Descriptions of the talus (ankle bone) in 2011 have helped to strengthen support for the strepsirrhine status of Azibius and Algeripithecus, which would indicate that the evolutionary history of lemurs and their kin is rooted in Africa. Likewise, if azibiids are simians, it would support the hypothesis that simians originated in Africa instead of Asia.

Azibiids were small-bodied primates, with Algeripithecus minutus weighing between 65 and 85 g (2.3 and 3.0 oz), Azibius trerki weighing approximately 115 and 160 g (4.1 and 5.6 oz), and an unnamed species of Azibius being notably larger, weighing an estimated 630 to 920 g (22 to 32 oz).

== Evolutionary history ==
Although the taxonomy is disputed, morphological evidence suggests that azibiids were one of the earliest offshoots of the early primate lineage leading to living lemuriforms, which excluded other adapiform primates. According to Tabuce et al., the mandible of Algeripithecus indicates it had an inclined canine tooth, similar to that found in crown lemuriforms (extant strepsirrhines). Although the anterior dentition of azibiids is unknown, they may have possessed a toothcomb (a specialized dental structure found in lemuriforms), indicating an ancient stem lineage of lemuriform primates in Africa, possibly descended from an early Asian branch of adapiforms such as a primitive branch of cercamoniines predating Donrussellia (one of the oldest European adapiforms). However, the uncertainty about the presence or absence of a true toothcomb in azibiids makes it difficult to determine if they are stem or crown lemuriforms. According to Tabuce et al., Azibiids belong to an Afro–Arabian clade of stem lemuriform primates, including successive sister taxa such as djebelemurids (including Djebelemur and 'Anchomomys' milleri) and a group that includes Plesiopithecus and crown lemuriforms. However, if azibiids are simians, as originally suggested with Algeripithecus, then they demonstrate an ancient simian lineage and their evolutionary divergence on the continent of Africa, contrary to the competing view that simians first evolved in Asia.

General phylogeny of strepsirrhines

- Primates
  - Haplorhines
    - †Omomyiforms
    - - Simians (monkeys, apes, and humans)
      - Tarsiers
  - Strepsirrhines
    - †Adapiforms
    - - †Azibiids
      - - †Djebelemurids
        - - Lemuriforms (lemurs, lorises, and galagos)
          - †Plesiopithecus

An Afro-Arabian clade of early strepsirrhines is thought to have given rise modern lemurs, lorises, and galagos. Azibiid taxonomy is still disputed.

=== Taxonomy ===
The first species, Azibius trerki, was originally described by Jean Sudre in 1975 as a possible 'paromomyiform' (a type of plesiadapiform, an extinct group of arboreal mammals considered to be a sister group to the primate clade), but was also interpreted as a hyopsodontid (a type of extinct condylarth) by paleoanthropologist Frederick S. Szalay that same year. The following year, paleoanthropologist Philip D. Gingerich reclassified it as an adapid (an extinct type of adapiform primate from Europe). Throughout the 1990s and 2000s, debates over its classification continued, with some researchers suggesting it might be related to macroscelidids (elephant shrews), while others supported initial interpretations as adapids or plesiadapiforms (particularly carpolestids).

In 2006, paleoanthropologist Marc Godinot favored a relationship between Azibius and simians, but tentatively suggested Azibius may be more closely related to toothcombed primates, which include all extant strepsirrhines. This latter view has gained increasing support with the reclassification of Algeripithecus (once considered a basal simian) as a closely related azibiid. Additional fossil teeth and the maxilla (upper jaw) of both genera discovered between 2003 and 2009 helped demonstrate their relationship. Based on the same fossil finds, Tabelia—which was also considered to be one of the oldest known simians along with Algeripithecus—is also now considered to be a synonym of Azibius. Also, the third and fourth lower premolars (P_{3} and P_{4}) distinguish azibiids from carpolestids, while the upper fourth premolar (P^{4}) matches what was thought to be the second upper molar (M^{2}) of Dralestes hammadaensis, another suspected plesiadapiform or genus of azibiid. Specimens of Dralestes are now recognized as being either Azibius and Algeripithecus, and Tabuce et al. claimed that Dralestes was a synonym of Azibius in 2009. However, in 2010, Godinot cautiously suggested that Dralestes may be a synonym of Algeripithecus based on a blade-like premolar. He also reasserted his view that Algeripithecus was a simian based on its upper molar morphology and hypothesized that this applied to all azibiids, favoring his earlier view that they may be early simians instead of stem lemuriforms. The argument for strepsirrhine affinities was strengthened in 2011 when Marivaux et al. published an interpretation of recently discovered talus bones (Note: Talus bones are commonly used to taxonomically differentiate simians from "prosimian" primates in the fossil record.) found at Gour Lazib, which they claimed were more similar to those of living strepsirrhines and extinct adapiforms, not simians. The tali morphology also differed radically from those of plesiadapiforms, confirming that azibiids are true primates.

== Anatomy and physiology ==
All known azibiids were small-bodied primates. The body mass of Algeripithecus minutus was estimated (Note: Size estimates were calculated using regressions of the area of the first molar compared to living primates.) between 65 and 85 g (2.3 and 3.0 oz), equivalent in size to a hairy-eared dwarf lemur (Allocebus trichotis) or the brown mouse lemur (Microcebus rufus). Azibius trerki was estimated to weigh between 115 and 160 g (4.1 and 5.6 oz), comparable in size to a gray mouse lemur (Microcebus murinus). An unnamed species, cf. Azibius sp., was larger, weighing between 630 and 920 g (22 and 32 oz), making it similar in size to sportive lemurs (Lepilemur).

== Distribution ==
Both Azibius and Algeripithecus have only been found in the Glib Zegdou Formation of the Gour Lazib area in Algeria. The Glib Zegdou Formation dates to the late early or early middle Eocene. Two upper molars found in Chambi, Tunisia, which were originally associated with Djebelemur martinezi (another suspected stem lemuriform), may instead represent another primate more closely related to Algeripithecus.
