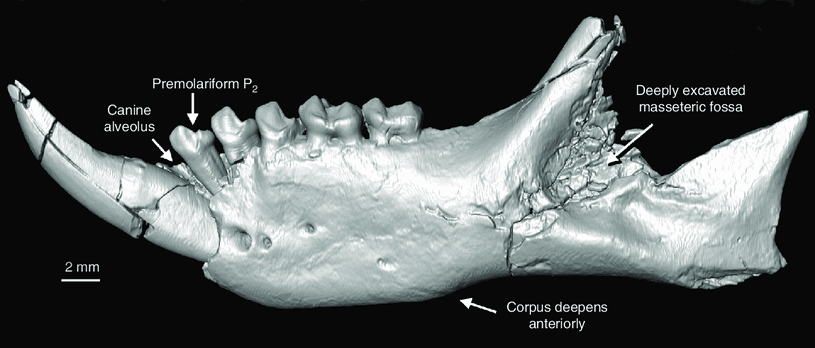

Scientific classification
- Kingdom: Animalia
- Phylum: Chordata
- Class: Mammalia
- Order: Primates
- Suborder: Strepsirrhini
- Family: †Plesiopithecidae; Simons and Rasmussen, 1994
- Genus: †Plesiopithecus; Simons, 1992
- Species: †P. teras

Binomial name
- †Plesiopithecus teras Simons, 1992

= Plesiopithecus =

Plesiopithecus Temporal range: Late Eocene

Extinct genus of mammals

Plesiopithecus is an extinct genus of early strepsirrhine primate from the late Eocene.

== Anatomy ==
Originally described from the right mandible (lower jaw), its confusing anatomy resulted in it being classified as an ape—its name translates "near ape". Plesiopithecus teras, the only species so far identified, was discovered in 1992 by Elwyn L. Simons in Egypt at the base of the Jebel Qatrani Formation at Fayum in quarry L-41. Within two years, a more complete, crushed skull was found, demonstrating that it was a strepsirrhine primate. It is thought to be a close relative of lemuriforms (extant strepsirrhines), and a sister group to either lorisoids or all lemuriforms.

Plesiopithecus was a medium-sized strepsirrhine primate, with large orbits, a high muzzle, and a skull exhibiting klinorhynchy (a marked angle between the palate and the basicranium, or the lower region of the braincase). Its large orbits indicate that it was nocturnal, and its teeth suggest that it bored holes in wood in search of soft-bodied insects, just like the aye-aye.

== Etymology ==
The genus name Plesiopithecus derives from the Greek root plesi- (πλησίος, plēsios), meaning "near", and the Greek word πίθηκος (pithekos), meaning "trickster", which has historically been used to mean "ape". The species name derives from the Greek word τερασ (teras), meaning "wonderful or amazing animal".

== Evolutionary history ==
Although Plesiopithecus is now clearly recognized as being related to lemuriforms (extant strepsirrhine primates), its phylogenetic relations among the fossil primates are unclear. Phylogenetic analyses using 359 morphological traits place it as a sister group of lemuriforms, along with other Eocene African sister taxa, the djebelemurids, which include Djebelemur and 'Anchomomys' milleri. This Afro-Arabian clade, which includes crown lemuriforms and possibly the disputed azibiids, excludes the Holarctic adapiforms and may be descended from an early Asian branch of adapiforms such as a primitive branch of cercamoniines predating Donrussellia (one of the oldest European adapiforms). A general consensus places Plesiopithecus at the base of the lemuriform clade, possibly closer to the lemuriforms than the djebelemurids. Due to its combination of the lack of a toothcomb (a specialized dental structure found in most lemuriforms) and a front dentition that is enlarged and procumbent, Plesiopithecus has been considered a possible relative of the aye-aye (Daubentonia madagascariensis), suggesting a possible close relationship. This close relationship between Plesiopithecus and the aye-aye within the lemur radiation was recovered by Gunnell et al. (2018), suggesting that lemur evolution involved two dispersal events from Africa to Madagascar.

General phylogeny of strepsirrhines

- Primates
  - Haplorhines
    - †Omomyiforms
    - - Simians (monkeys, apes, & humans)
      - Tarsiers
  - Strepsirrhines
    - †Adapiforms
    - - †Azibiids
      - - †Djebelemurids
        - - Lemuriforms (lemurs, lorises, and galagos)
          - †Plesiopithecus

An Afro-Arabian clade of early strepsirrhines is thought to have given rise modern lemurs, lorises, and galagos. Azibiid taxonomy is still disputed.

Alternatively, it may have closer ties to the aye-aye (Daubentonia madagascariensis) within the lemuroid (lemur) radiation. The cranial and dental morphology of Plesiopithecus resemble what is predicted of an aye-aye ancestor, with an arched cranial vault suggesting klinorhynchy (a marked angle between the palate and the basicranium, or the lower region of the braincase) similar to that of aye-ayes, significantly enlarged canines and/or incisors, reduced molars and premolars, a high muzzle, and anteriorly placed orbits. However, it lacked ever-growing incisors and the diastema found in the aye-aye. The increased anterior dentition is peculiar because it has only happened in lemuriforms, and has never been observed in any of the numerous adapiforms. Key to this possible close affinity with the aye-aye is the identity (canine vs. incisor) of the procumbent front teeth of both species, neither of which is definitively known. If they are different between the two species, then the similarities would be due to convergence. If they are the same tooth, then it may suggest a close phylogenetic relation and African origins for the aye-aye.

If Plesiopithecus is an African relative of the aye-aye, it would suggest lemuroid primates colonized Madagascar twice. Molecular studies show that the aye-aye diverged early in the evolutionary history of lemurs, followed later by a sudden burst of diversification of the other four lemur families. If Plesiopithecus is an aye-aye relative, lemurs and aye-ayes would have diverged in Africa and the aye-aye ancestor would have colonized Madagascar separately from the other lemurs, which would have diversified immediately upon arrival to the island. If aye-ayes are more closely related to lemurs than Plesiopithecus, then only one colonization event occurred, with the aye-aye branching off first and then the other lemuroid families diverging several million years later following a major extinction event.

=== Taxonomy ===
Plesiopithecus teras was first described in 1992 by paleoanthropologist Elwyn L. Simons. The holotype, which was found at the base of the Jebel Qatrani Formation at the Egyptian Fayum in quarry L-41 and dated to the latest Eocene, included a right mandible with intact dentition ranging from the third molar up to the first anterior tooth. Simons acknowledged that the taxonomic interpretation was complicated, though he initially decided to classify under superfamily Hominoidea (apes) due to its flat and broad lower molars. Its bizarre and specialized traits made it difficult to classify until the discovery of its skull, reported in 1994, showed it had a postorbital bar, proving that it was a strepsirrhine primate. Plesiopithecus was then placed within a new superfamily, Plesiopithecoidea tentatively under "Infraorder cf. Lorisiformes". The superfamily has also been grouped under the infraorder Lemuriformes.

As of 2010, P. teras was represented by a nearly complete and partially crushed cranium and three partial mandibles. Prior to Simons' discovery of the right jaw, one of its molars had been found a few years earlier and incorrectly attributed to an Eocene lorisoid. Several cranial and facial similarities with living lorisoids indicate that it is closely related to lemuriforms (lemurs and lorisoids), although its lack of a toothcomb precludes it from being ancestral to either branch of the lemuriform clade. Due to the differences in dental anatomy, Plesiopithecus is thought to be a sister group to either lorisoids or all living lemuriforms.

== Anatomy and physiology ==
With a skull length of nearly 53 mm (2.1 in), Plesiopithecus was a medium-sized strepsirrhine primate. Its skull is marked by a high muzzle, klinorhynchy, and relatively large orbits. It has very large and procumbent upper canines that are straight and compressed on both sides, and have roots that extend deep into the maxilla (upper jaw). No upper incisors have been found. The unidentified lower front tooth is also enlarged and procumbent. It has three premolars and three molars that decrease in size from front to back. The upper molars are simple and lack a hypocone. The lower molars are relatively broad.

== Behavior ==
Its large orbits suggest Plesiopithecus was nocturnal. Due to cranial and dental similarities with the aye-aye and signs of wear on the tips of its front teeth, it is thought to have bored holes in wood in search of soft-bodied insects, which likely make up its diet.
