= Algeripithecus =

Algeripithecus Temporal range: Ypresian–Lutetian

Scientific classification
- Kingdom: Animalia
- Phylum: Chordata
- Class: Mammalia
- Order: Primates
- Suborder: Strepsirrhini
- Family: †Azibiidae
- Genus: †Algeripithecus; Godinot & Mahboubi, 1992

Type species
- Algeripithecus minutus Godinot & Mahboubi, 1992

Other species
- Algeripithecus minimissimus Marivaux et al., 2025

Extinct genus of primates

Algeripithecus is an extinct genus of early fossil primate, weighing approximately 65 to 85 grams (2.3 to 3.0 oz). Fossils have been found in Algeria and Tunisia dating from 50 to 46 million years ago.

It was once commonly thought to be one of the oldest simian primates (a group that includes monkeys and apes), and was crucial to the hypothesis that simians originated in Africa. Research on more complete specimens suggest it was instead a strepsirrhine primate, more closely related to living lemurs and lorisoids. However, this is still disputed.

== Discovery ==
Fragmentary fossils were first found in the Glib Formation at the Glib Zegdou locality in Algeria and dated to the Early to Middle Eocene, 50 to 46 million years ago. The holotype was an upper left molar (M^{2}). A second species was described from Djebel Chambi in Tunisia in 2025, Algeripithecus minimissimus.

== Evolutionary history and taxonomy ==
First described in the journal Nature by Marc Godinot and Mohamed Mahboubi in 1992, Algeripithecus was once widely considered one of the oldest known fossil simian primates, giving weight to the African origins hypothesis for simians. It was originally interpreted as a propliopithecid, but was also seen as a proteopithecid by Godinot in 1994 and as a parapithecoid by Seiffert et al. starting in 2005. Based on the discovery of additional fossil teeth and a maxilla (upper jaw) between 2003 and 2009, Tabuce et al. reconstructed Algeripithecus as an azibiid, a group thought to be a type of stem lemuriform, or strepsirrhine primate. According to Tabuce et al., the mandible of Algeripithecus indicates it had an inclined canine tooth, similar to that found in toothcombed primates. Although the anterior dentition of azibiids is unknown, they may have possessed a toothcomb, indicating an ancient stem lineage of lemuriform primates in Africa, possibly descended from an early Asian branch of adapiforms such as a primitive branch of cercamoniines predating Donrussellia (one of the oldest European adapiforms). As a result, the African origins of crown strepsirhines (including lemurs and lorisoids) is well supported, whereas the African origins of simians has been placed in doubt, possibly giving favor to an Asian origins hypothesis. However, in 2010, Godinot reasserted his view that Algeripithecus was a simian based on its upper molar morphology and hypothesized that this applied to all azibiids, favoring his earlier view that azibiids may be early simians instead of stem lemuriforms. In 2011, Marivaux et al. published an interpretation of recently discovered talus bones (Note: Talus bones are commonly used to taxonomically differentiate simians from "prosimian" primates in the fossil record.) of closely related Azibius found at Gour Lazib, which they claimed were more similar to those of living strepsirrhines and extinct adapiforms, not simians, thus reinforcing the strepsirrhine status favored by Tabuce et al. two years earlier.

Godinot also cautiously suggested that Dralestes may be a synonym of Algeripithecus based on a blade-like premolar. Alternatively, the second upper molar (M^{2}) of Dralestes hammadaensis have been reinterpreted by Tabuce et al. as being the upper fourth premolar (P^{4}) of Azibius, and therefore considered Dralestes to be a synonym of Azibius. Specimens of Dralestes are now recognized as being either Azibius and Algeripithecus.

== Anatomy and physiology ==
Like all azibiids, Algeripithecus was a small-bodied primate. Initially thought to weigh 150 to 300 g (5.3 to 10.6 oz), Algeripithecus minutus is now estimated (Note: Size estimates were calculated using regressions of the area of the first molar compared to living primates.) to have weighed between 65 and 85 g (2.3 and 3.0 oz), nearly half the weight of the only other known azibiid, Azibius trerki. It was comparable in size to a hairy-eared dwarf lemur (Allocebus trichotis) or a brown mouse lemur (Microcebus rufus). A. minimissimus weighed between 49 and 87 g.
