= Evolution of lemurs =

History of primate evolution on Madagascar

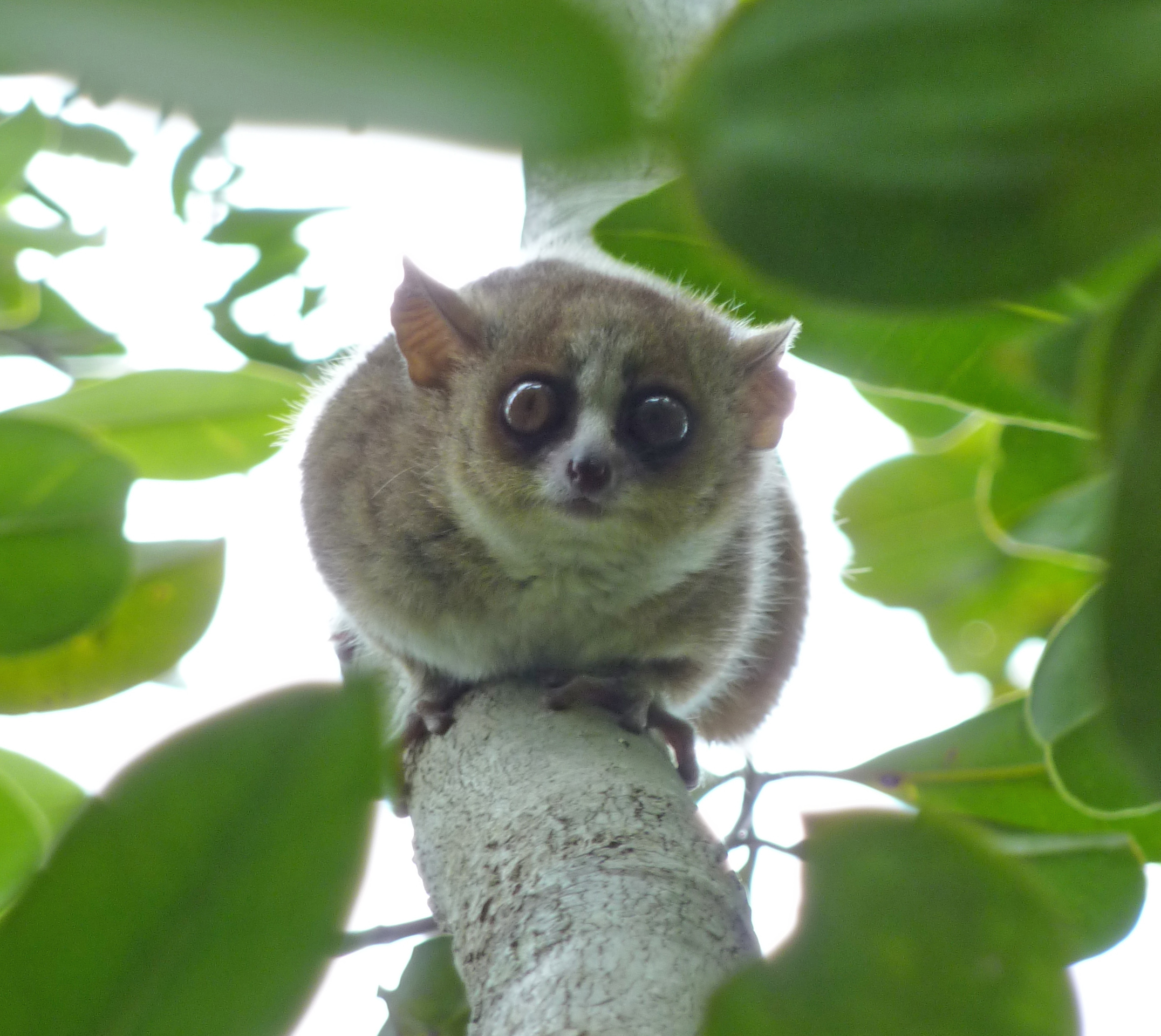
Mouse lemurs, the smallest primates in the world, evolved in isolation along with other lemurs on the island of Madagascar.

Lemurs, primates belonging to the suborder Strepsirrhini which branched off from other primates less than 63 million years ago, evolved on the island of Madagascar, for at least 40 million years. They share some traits with the most basal primates, and thus are often confused as being ancestral to modern monkeys, apes, and humans. Instead, they merely resemble ancestral primates.

Lemurs are thought to have evolved during the Eocene or earlier, sharing a closest common ancestor with lorises, pottos, and galagos (lorisoids). Fossils from Africa and some tests of nuclear DNA suggest that lemurs made their way to Madagascar between 40 and 52 mya. Other mitochondrial and nuclear DNA sequence comparisons offer an alternative date range of 62 to 65 mya. An ancestral lemur population is thought to have inadvertently rafted to the island on a floating mat of vegetation, although hypotheses for land bridges and island hopping have also been proposed. The timing and number of hypothesized colonizations has traditionally hinged on the phylogenetic affinities of the aye-aye, the most basal member of the lemur clade.

Having undergone their own independent evolution on Madagascar, lemurs have diversified to fill many niches normally filled by other types of mammals. They include the smallest primates in the world, and once included some of the largest. Since the arrival of humans approximately 2,000 years ago, lemurs are now restricted to 10% of the island, or approximately 60,000 square kilometers (23,000 square miles), with many facing extinction.

== Evolutionary history ==
Lemurs are primates belonging to the suborder Strepsirrhini. Like other strepsirrhine primates, such as lorises, pottos, and galagos, they share ancestral traits with early primates. In this regard, lemurs are popularly confused with ancestral primates; however, lemurs did not give rise to monkeys and apes, but evolved independently on Madagascar.

Primates first evolved sometime between the Middle Cretaceous and the early Paleocene periods on either the supercontinent of Laurasia or in Africa. According to molecular clock studies, the last common ancestor of all primates dates to around 79.6 mya, although the earliest known fossil primates are only 54–55 million years old. The closest relatives of primates are the extinct plesiadapiforms, the modern colugos (commonly and inaccurately named "flying lemurs"), and treeshrews. Some of the earliest known true primates are represented by the fossil groups Omomyidae, Eosimiidae, and Adapiformes.

The relationship between known fossil primate families remains unclear. A conservative estimate for the divergence of haplorhines (tarsiers, monkeys, apes, and humans) and strepsirrhines is 58 to 63 mya. A consensus is emerging that places omomyids as a sister group to tarsiers, eosimiids as a stem group to simians (non-tarsier haplorhines), and Djebelemur, an African genus likely to be related to an early Asian branch of cercamoniine adapiforms, as a stem group to modern strepsirrhines, including lemurs. In 2009, a highly publicized and scientifically criticized publication proclaimed that a 47-million-year-old adapiform fossil, Darwinius masillae, demonstrated both adapiform and simian traits, making it a transitional form between the prosimian and simian lineages. Media sources inaccurately dubbed the fossil as a "missing link" between lemurs and humans.

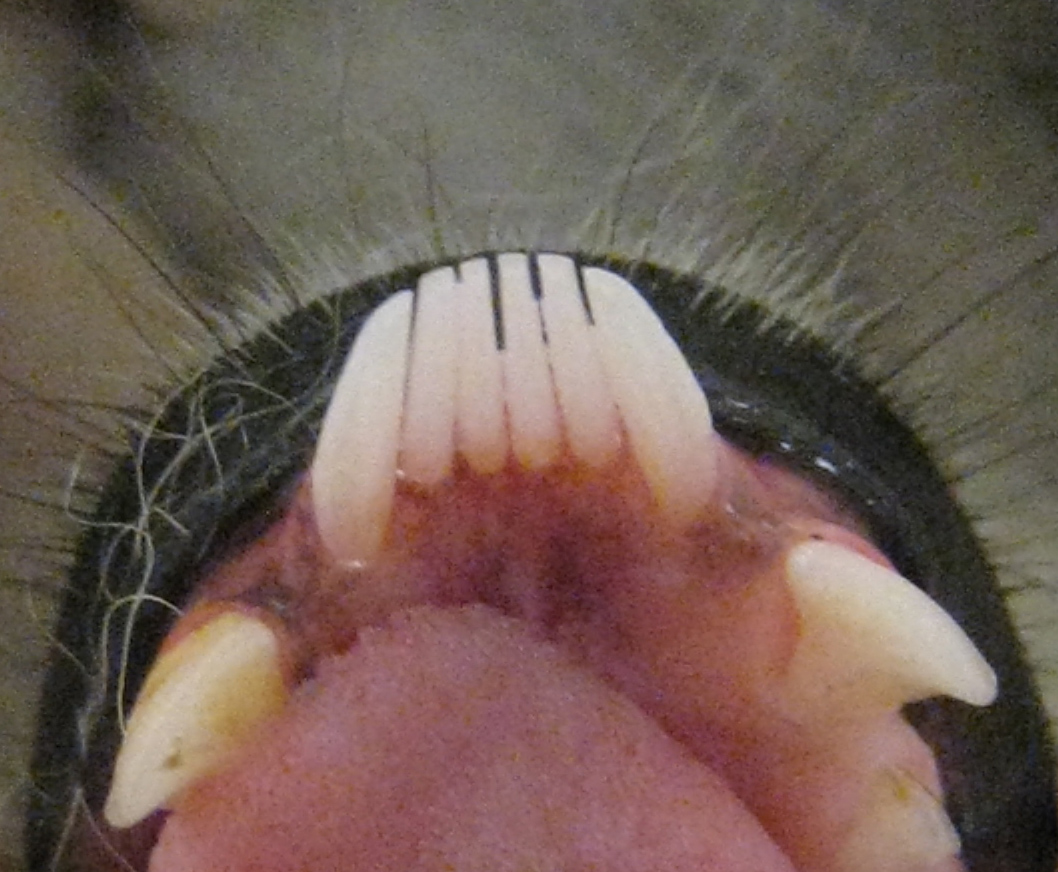
Fossil evidence for the evolution of the toothcomb, a trait shared by lemurs with their closest relatives, the lorisoids, provides insight into both the evolutionary history of strepsirrhines and the lemur colonization of Madagascar.

Lemurs were traditionally thought to have evolved during the Eocene (55 to 37 mya) based on the fossil record, although molecular tests suggest the Paleocene (66 to 56 mya) or later. Until recently, they were thought to have descended directly from the diverse group of adapiforms due to several shared postcranial traits, as well as long snouts and small brains. Although adapiforms also had lemur-like auditory bullae, a prosimian characteristic, they had smaller brains and longer snouts than lemurs. There are also several other morphological differences. Most noticeably, adapiforms lack a key derived trait, the toothcomb, and possibly the toilet-claw, found not only in extant (living) strepsirrhines but also in tarsiers. Unlike lemurs, adapiforms exhibited a fused mandibular symphysis (a characteristic of simians) and also possessed four premolars, instead of three or two.

Comparative studies of the cytochrome b gene, which are frequently used to determine phylogenetic relationships among mammals—particularly within families and genera—have been used to show that lemurs share common ancestry with lorisoids. This conclusion is also corroborated by the shared strepsirrhine toothcomb, an unusual trait that is unlikely to have evolved twice. If adapiforms were the ancestors of the living strepsirrhines, then the last common ancestor of modern strepsirrhines would have to predate the early Eocene, a view supported by molecular phylogenetic studies by Anne D. Yoder and Ziheng Yang in 2004, which showed that lemurs split from lorises approximately 62 to 65 mya. These dates were confirmed by more extensive tests by Julie Horvath et al. in 2008. These molecular studies also showed that lemuroids diversified before the modern lorisoids. Using a more limited data set and only nuclear genes, another study in 2005 by Céline Poux et al. dated the split between lemurs and lorises at 60 mya, lemur diversification at 50 mya, and the lemur colonization of Madagascar somewhere between these two approximate dates. However, the 2003 discovery of fossil lorisoids at the Fayum Depression in Egypt pushed the date of lorisoid divergence back to the Eocene, matching the divergence dates predicted by Yoder and Horvath.

The fossil record tells a different story. Although it cannot show the earliest possible date for the appearance of a taxonomic group, other concerns have arisen about these vastly earlier divergence dates predicted independently of the fossil record. First, palaeontologists have expressed concerns that if primates have been around for significantly more than 66 million years, then the first one-third of the primate fossil record is missing. Another problem is that some of these molecular dates have overestimated the divergence of other mammalian orders, such as Rodentia, suggesting primate divergence might also be overestimated. One of the oldest known strepsirrhines, Djebelemur, dates from the early Eocene of northern Africa and lacks a fully differentiated toothcomb. Based on fossils and other genetic tests, a more conservative estimate dates the divergence between lemurs and lorises to around 50 to 55 mya.

To complicate the ancestry puzzle, no terrestrial Eocene or Paleocene fossils have been found on Madagascar, and the fossil record from both Africa and Asia around this time is not much better. Fossil sites in Madagascar are restricted to only five windows in time, which omit most of the Cenozoic, from 66 mya to ~26,000 years ago. What little fossil-bearing rock exists from this vast span of time is dominated by marine strata along the west coast. The oldest lemur fossils on Madagascar are actually subfossils dating to the Late Pleistocene.

=== Colonization of Madagascar ===
Once part of the supercontinent Gondwana, Madagascar broke away from eastern Africa, the most likely source of the ancestral lemur population, about 160 mya and then from Antarctica between 80 and 130 mya. Initially, the island drifted south from where it split from Africa (around modern Somalia) until it reached its current position between 80 and 90 mya. Around that time, it split with India, leaving it isolated in the Indian Ocean and separated from nearby Africa by the Mozambique Channel, a deep channel with a minimum width of approximately 560 km (350 mi). These separation dates and the estimated age of the primate lineage preclude any possibility that lemurs could have been on the island before Madagascar pulled away from Africa, an evolutionary process known as vicariance. In support of this, mammalian fossils on Madagascar from the Cretaceous (see Mesozoic mammals of Madagascar) include gondwanatheres and other mammalian groups that would not have been ancestral to lemurs or the other endemic mammals present on the island today.

With Madagascar already geographically isolated by the Paleocene and lemur diversification dating to the same time, an explanation was needed for how lemurs had made it to the island. In the 19th century, prior to the theory of continental drift, scientists including Philip Sclater, Étienne Geoffroy Saint-Hilaire, and Ernst Haeckel suggested that Madagascar and India were once part of a southern continent—named Lemuria by Sclater—that has since disappeared under the Indian Ocean. By the early 20th century, oceanic dispersal emerged as the most popular explanation for how lemurs reached the island. The idea first took shape under the anti-plate tectonics movement of the early 1900s, when renowned paleontologist William Diller Matthew proposed the idea in his influential article "Climate and Evolution" in 1915. In the article, Matthew could only account for the presence of lemurs in Madagascar by "rafting". In the 1940s, American paleontologist George Gaylord Simpson coined the term "sweepstakes dispersal" for such unlikely events.

As plate tectonics theory took hold, oceanic dispersal fell out of favor and was even considered by many researchers to be "miraculous" if it occurred. Despite the low likelihood of its occurrence, oceanic dispersal remains the most accepted explanation for numerous vertebrate colonizations of Madagascar, including that of the lemurs. Although unlikely, over long periods of time terrestrial animals can occasionally raft to remote islands on floating mats of tangled vegetation, which get flushed out to sea from major rivers by floodwaters.

Any extended ocean voyage without fresh water or food would prove difficult for a large, warm-blooded (homeothermic) mammal, but today many small, nocturnal species of lemur exhibit heterothermy, which allows them to lower their metabolism and become dormant while living off fat reserves. Such a trait in a small, nocturnal lemur ancestor would have facilitated the ocean voyage and could have been passed on to its descendants. However, this trait has not been observed in the closely related lorisoids studied to date, and could have evolved on Madagascar in response to the island's harsh environmental conditions.

Because only five terrestrial orders of mammals have made it to the island, each likely to have derived from a single colonization, and since these colonizations date to either the early Cenozoic or the early Miocene, the conditions for oceanic dispersal to Madagascar seem to have been better during two separate periods in the past. A report published in January 2010 supported this assumption by demonstrating that both Madagascar and Africa were 1,650 km (1,030 mi) south of their present-day positions around 60 mya, placing them in a different ocean gyre and reversing the strong current that presently flows away from Madagascar. The currents were even shown to be stronger than they are today, shortening the rafting time to approximately 30 days or less, making the crossing much easier for a small mammal. Over time, as the continental plates drifted northward, the currents gradually changed, and by 20 mya the window for oceanic dispersal had closed.

Since the 1970s, the rafting hypothesis has been called into question by claims that lemur family Cheirogaleidae might be more closely related to the other Afro-Asian strepsirrhines than to the rest of the lemurs. This idea was initially based on similarities in behavior and molar morphology, although it gained support with the 2001 discovery of 30‑million-year-old Bugtilemur in Pakistan and the 2003 discovery of 40‑million-year-old Karanisia in Egypt. Karanisia is the oldest fossil found that bears a toothcomb, whereas Bugtilemur was thought to have a toothcomb, but also had even more similar molar morphology to Cheirogaleus (dwarf lemurs). If these relationships had been correct, the dates of these fossils would have had implications on the colonization of Madagascar, requiring two separate events. The most parsimonious explanation, given the genetic evidence and the absence of toothcombed primates in European fossil sites, is that stem strepsirrhines evolved on the Afro-Arabian landmass, dispersing to Madagascar and more recently from Africa to Asia. More recently, the structure and general presence of the toothcomb in Bugtilemur has been questioned, as well as many other dental features, suggesting it is most likely an adapiform.

An alternative form of oceanic dispersal that had been considered was island hopping, where the lemur ancestors might have made it to Madagascar in small steps by colonizing exposed seamounts during times of low sea level. However, this is unlikely since the only seamounts found along the Davie Ridge would have been too small in such a wide channel. Even though the Comoro Islands between Africa and Madagascar are significantly larger, they are too young, having been formed by volcanic activity only around 8 mya. A land bridge between Madagascar and Africa has also been proposed, but a land bridge would have facilitated the migration of a much greater sampling of Africa's mammalian fauna than is endemic to the island. Furthermore, deep trenches separate Madagascar from the mainland, and prior to the Oligocene, sea level was significantly higher than today.

A variant of the land bridge hypothesis has been proposed in an attempt to explain both how a land bridge could have formed, and why other mammalian orders failed to cross it. Geological studies have shown that following the collision of India and Asia, the Davie fracture zone had been pushed up by tectonic forces, possibly high enough to create a land bridge. Indeed, core samples along the Davie Fracture Zone suggest that at least parts of the Mozambique Channel were above sea level between 45 and 26 mya, or possibly as early as 55 mya. Following the Indian-Asian collision, the fault type changed from a strike-slip fault to a normal fault, and seafloor spreading created compression along the Davie Fracture Zone, causing it to rise. By the early Miocene, the East African Rift created tension along the fault, causing it to subside beneath the ocean. The divergence dates of many Malagasy mammalian orders formerly fell within this window. Old World monkeys, dogs, and cats did not diverge or arrive in Africa until later in the Miocene. However, more recent dating of divergence of the Malagasy mammalian clades falls outside of this land bridge window, and a much greater diversity of mammal groups would be expected on Madagascar had the land bridge been present during that stretch of time.

The dating of the lemur colonization is controversial for the same reasons as strepsirrhine evolution. Using both mitochondrial and nuclear DNA sequences, a single colonization has been estimated at 62 to 65 mya based on the split between the aye-aye and the rest of the lemurs. On the other hand, the sparse fossil record and some estimates based on other nuclear genes support a more recent estimate of 40 to 52 mya. Furthermore, a fossil strepsirrhine primate from Africa, Plesiopithecus, may suggest that the aye-aye and the rest of the lemurs diverged in Africa, which would require at least two colonization events.

Once safely established on Madagascar, with its limited mammalian population, the lemurs were protected from the increasing competition from evolving arboreal mammalian groups. Monkeys had evolved by the Oligocene, and their intelligence, aggression, and deceptiveness may have given them the advantage in exploiting the environment over the diurnal adapiform primates in Africa and Asia, ultimately driving them to extinction and leaving only the nocturnal lorisoids.

=== Diversification ===
Competing lemur phylogenies

- Lemuroidea
  - Daubentoniidae
  - - - Indriidae
      - - Lepilemuridae
        - Cheirogaleidae
    - Lemuridae

- Lemuroidea
  - Daubentoniidae
  - - Lepilemuridae
    - - Cheirogaleidae
      - - - Lemuridae
          - †Megaladapidae
        - - Indriidae
          - †Palaeopropithecidae
          - †Archaeolemuridae

There are two competing lemur phylogenies, one by Horvath et al. (top) and one by Orlando et al. (bottom). Note that Horvath et al. did not attempt to place the subfossil lemurs.

The ancestral lemur that colonized Madagascar is thought to have been small and nocturnal. More specifically, it is thought to have had adapiform-like cranial anatomy—particularly the cranial foramina and the middle ear—comparable to that of lemurids, while being similar to cheirogaleids in dentition and postcranial anatomy.

Nothing definitive is known about the island's biogeography at the time of the colonization, however, the paleoclimate (ancient weather patterns) may have been affected by Madagascar's location below the subtropical ridge at 30° S latitude and disruption of the weather patterns by India as it drifted northward. Both would have created a drying effect on Madagascar, and as a result, the arid spiny bush that is currently found in the south and southwest of Madagascar would have dominated the island. This would have placed strong selection pressure for drought tolerance on the inhabitants of the island between the Cretaceous and the Eocene. As Madagascar edged above the subtropical ridge and India moved closer to Asia, the climate became less dry and the arid spiny bush retreated to the south and southwest.

Lemurs have diversified greatly since first reaching Madagascar. The aye-aye and its extinct relations are thought to have diverged first, shortly after colonization. According to molecular studies, there have since been two major episodes of diversification, from which all other known extant and extinct family lineages emerged. The remaining families diverged in the first diversification episode, during a 10 to 12 million-year window between the Late Eocene (42 mya) and into the Oligocene (30 mya). The dates for this divergence window span the Eocene–Oligocene extinction event, during which time climate cooling took place and changes in ocean currents altered weather patterns. Outside of Madagascar, these dates also coincide with the divergence of the lorisoid primates and five major clades of squirrels, all occupying niches similar to those of lemurs. The dates do not suggest that increased predation drove family-level divergence since the first carnivores arrived on the island between 24 and 18 mya. The precise relationship between the four of the five families of lemurs is disputed since they diverged during this narrow and distant window. Although all studies place Cheirogaleidae and Lepilemuridae as a sister clade to Indriidae and Lemuridae, some suggest that Cheirogaleidae and Lepilemuridae diverged first, while others suggest that Indriidae and Lemuridae were the first to branch off.

The second major episode of diversification occurred during the Late Miocene, approximately 8 to 12 mya, and included the true lemurs (Eulemur) and the mouse lemurs (Microcebus). This event coincided with the beginning of the Indian monsoons, the last major change in climate to affect Madagascar. The populations of both the true lemurs and mouse lemurs were thought to have diverged due to habitat fragmentation when humans arrived on the island roughly 2,000 years ago. Only recently has molecular research shown a more distant split in these genera. Most surprising were the mouse lemurs, a group which is now thought to contain cryptic species, meaning they are indistinguishable from each other based solely on appearance. In contrast, true lemurs are easier to distinguish and exhibit sexual dichromatism. Studies in karyology, molecular genetics, and biogeographic patterns have also assisted in understanding their phylogeny and diversification. Although the divergence estimates for these two genera are imprecise, they overlap with a change to a wetter climate in Madagascar, as new weather patterns generated monsoons and likely influenced the plant life.

This difference in evolutionary divergence between the two genera may be due to differences in their activity patterns. True lemurs are often diurnal, allowing potential mates to distinguish each other as well as other related species visually. Mouse lemurs, on the other hand, are nocturnal, reducing their ability to use visual signals for mate selection. Instead, they use olfactory and auditory signaling. For these reasons, true lemurs may have evolved sexual dichromatism while mouse lemurs evolved to be cryptic species.

== Distribution and diversity ==
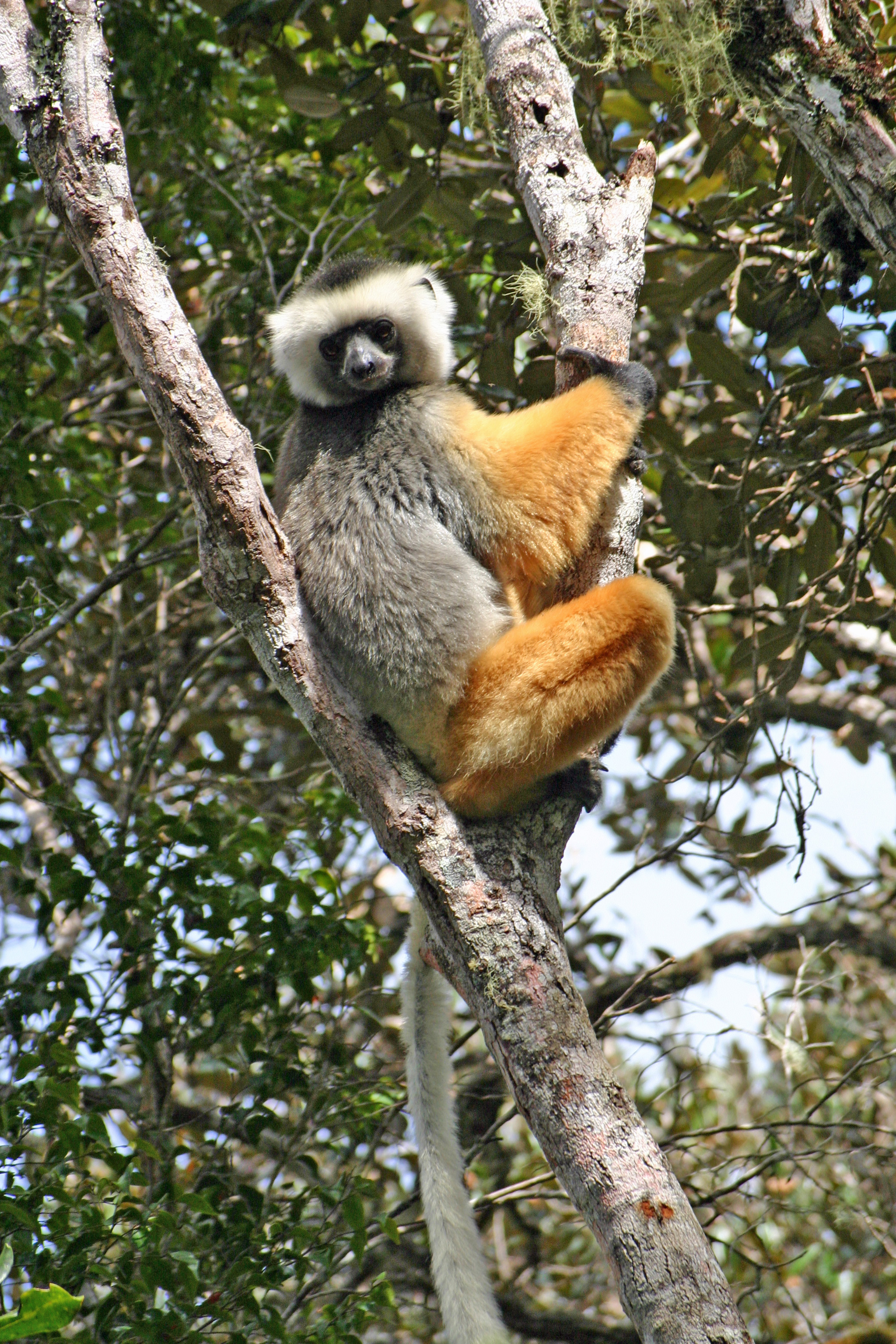
The diademed sifaka (Propithecus diadema) is one of the largest of the living lemurs, comparable in size to the indri. It lives in the rainforests of Madagascar and eats a varied diet of leaves and fruit.

Since their arrival on Madagascar, lemurs have diversified both in behavior and morphology. Their diversity rivals that of the monkeys and apes found throughout the rest of the world, especially when the recently extinct subfossil lemurs are considered. Ranging in size from the 30 g (1.1 oz) Madame Berthe's mouse lemur, the world's smallest primate, to the extinct 160–200 kg (350–440 lb) Archaeoindris fontoynonti, lemurs evolved diverse forms of locomotion, varying levels of social complexity, and unique adaptations to the local climate. They went on to fill many niches normally occupied by monkeys, squirrels, woodpeckers, and large grazing ungulates. In addition to the incredible diversity between lemur families, there has also been great diversification among closely related lemurs. Yet despite separation by geographical barriers or by niche differentiation in sympatry, occasionally hybridization can occur. Lemur diversification has also created generalist species, such as the true lemurs of northern Madagascar, which are very adaptable, mostly nondescript, and found throughout most of the island's forests.

Most of the 99 living lemur taxa are found only on Madagascar. Two species, the common brown lemur (Eulemur fulvus) and the mongoose lemur (Eulemur mongoz), can also be found on the Comoro Islands, although it is assumed that both species were introduced to the islands from northwestern Madagascar by humans within the last few hundred years. Molecular studies on Eulemur fulvus fulvus (from the mainland) and E. f. mayottensis (from the Comoro Islands) and on Comoro and mainland mongoose lemurs have supported this assumption by showing no genetic differences between the two populations. Because all lemurs, including these two brown lemur species, are only native to the island of Madagascar, they are considered to be endemic.

Historically, lemurs ranged across the entire island inhabiting a wide variety of habitats, including dry deciduous forests, lowland forests, spiny thickets, subhumid forests, montane forest, and mangrove. Today, their collective range is restricted to 10% of the island, or approximately 60,000 km^{2} (23,000 sq mi). Most of the remaining forests and lemurs are found along the periphery of the island. The center of the island, the Hauts-Plateaux, was converted by early settlers to rice paddies and grassland through slash-and-burn agriculture, known locally as tavy. As erosion depleted the soil, the cyclical forest regrowth and burning ended as the forest gradually failed to return. Today, the level of floral diversity increases with precipitation, from the dry southern forests to the wetter northern forests to the rainforests along the east coast. Increased foliage corresponds to increased faunal diversity, including the diversity and complexity of lemur communities.

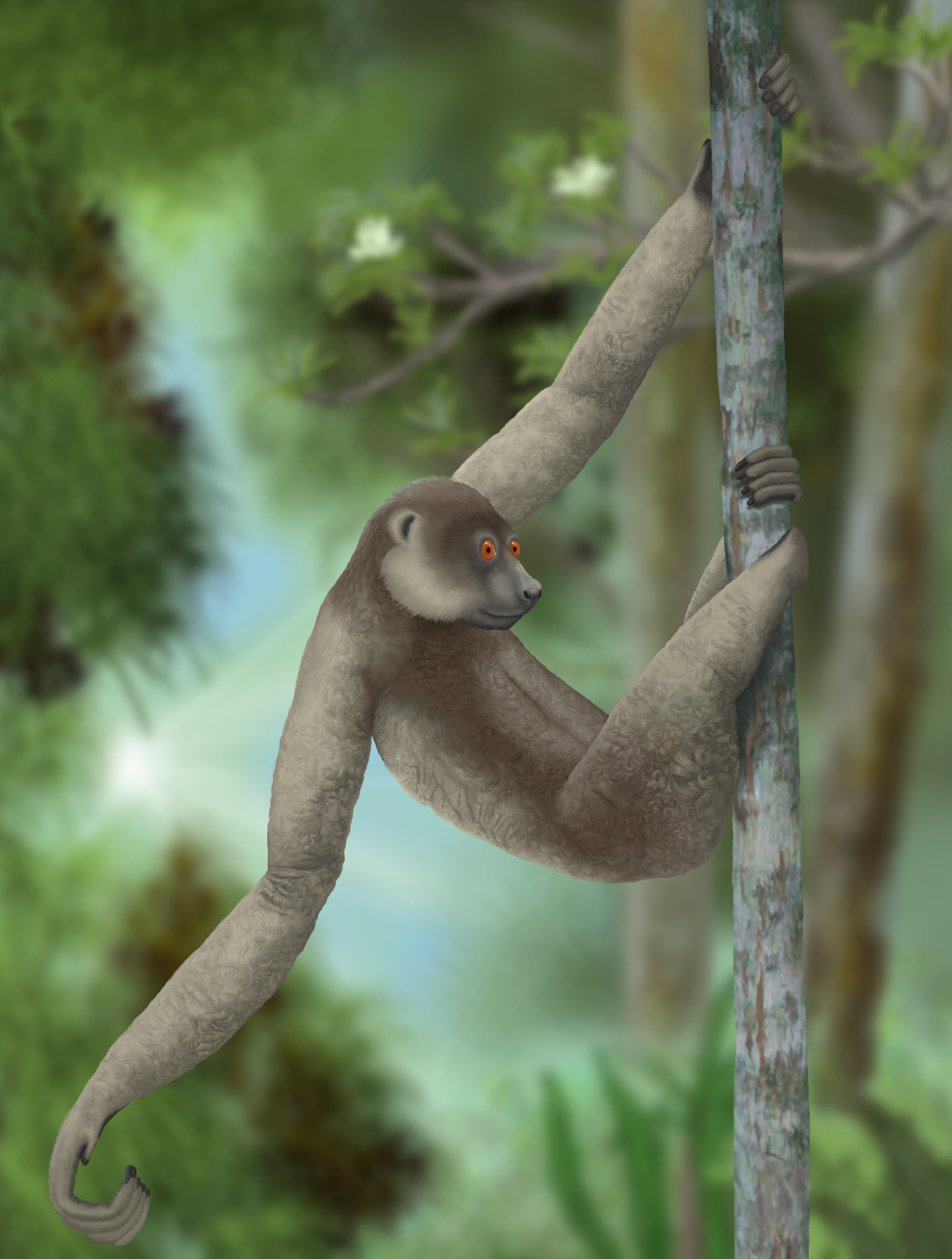
A life restoration of Palaeopropithecus ingens, a giant sloth lemur that became extinct less than a thousand years ago

Having evolved in Madagascar's challenging environment, replete with poor soils, extreme shifts in poor, seasonal plant productivity, and devastating climatic events such as extended droughts and annual cyclones, lemurs have adopted unique combinations of unusual traits to survive, distinguishing them significantly from other primates. In response to limited, seasonal resources, lemurs may exhibit seasonal fat storage, hypometabolism (including torpor and hibernation in some cheirogaleids), small group sizes, low encephalization (relative brain size), cathemerality (activity both day and night), and/or strict breeding seasons. Secondarily, extreme resource limitations and seasonal breeding are thought to have resulted in three other relatively common lemur traits: female dominance, sexual monomorphism (lack of size differences between the sexes), and male–male competition for mates involving low levels of agonism (conflict), such as sperm competition.

The arrival of humans on the island 1,500 to 2,000 years ago has taken a significant toll, not only on the size of lemur populations, but also on their diversity. Due to habitat destruction and hunting, at least 17 species and 8 genera have gone extinct and the populations of all species have decreased. A couple of species once thought to have gone extinct have since been rediscovered. The hairy-eared dwarf lemur (Allocebus trichotis) was only known from five museum specimens, most collected in the late 19th century and one in 1965. It was rediscovered in 1989 and has since been identified in five national parks, although it is very rare within its range. Likewise, the greater bamboo lemur (Prolemur simus) was thought to be extinct as recently as the late 1970s, but a population was located near Ranomafana National Park in the late 1980s. Historically, it had a much wider geographic distribution, shown by subfossil remains, but today it remains one of the world's 25 most endangered primates. One distinctive morph (possibly a species or subspecies) of sifaka, (Note: Propithecus diadema holomelas was once considered one of five subspecies of diademed sifaka. In 1986, Ian Tattersall subsumed it as a synonym for what is now known as Milne-Edwards' sifaka (known then as Propithecus diadema edwardsi). Both subspecies had only slight color variations and were known to be sympatric with each other in at least one forest. Since it was extirpated, the taxonomic status of Propithecus diadema holomelas has been questioned, but nothing definitive has been published.) has not been so fortunate, having been extirpated from all known localities. Unless trends change, extinctions are likely to continue.

Until recently, giant species of lemur existed on Madagascar. Now represented only by recent or subfossil remains, they were modern forms and are counted as part of the rich lemur diversity that evolved in isolation. Some of their adaptations were unlike those seen in lemurs today. All 17 extinct lemurs were larger than the extant forms, some weighing as much as 200 kg (440 lb), and are thought to have been active during the day. Not only were they unlike the living lemurs in both size and appearance, they also filled ecological niches that no longer exist or are now left unoccupied. Large parts of Madagascar, which are now devoid of forests and lemurs, once hosted diverse primate communities that included more than 20 species covering the full range of lemur sizes.
