= Sublingua =

Secondary tongue found in some primates

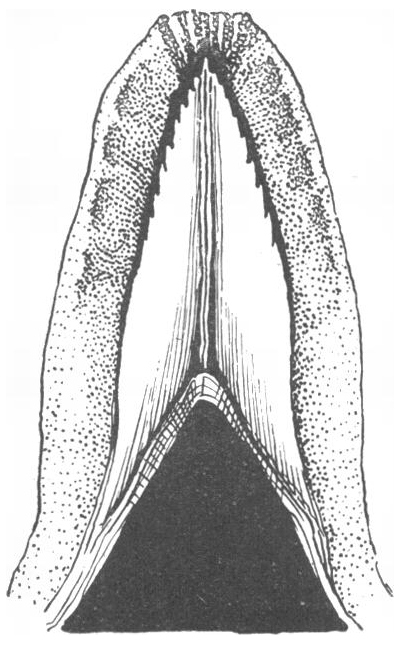
The sublingua is found on the underside of the primary tongue in tarsiers, lemuriform primates, and some other mammals.

The sublingua ("under-tongue") is a muscular secondary tongue found below the primary tongue in tarsiers and living strepsirrhine primates, which includes lemurs and lorisoids (collectively called "lemuriforms"). (Note: Although the monophyletic relationship between lemurs and lorisoids is widely accepted, their clade name is not. The term "lemuriform" is used here because it derives from one popular taxonomy that clumps the clade of toothcombed primates into one infraorder and the extinct, non-toothcombed adapiforms into another, both within the suborder Strepsirrhini. However, another popular alternative taxonomy places the lorisoids in their own infraorder, Lorisiformes.) Although it is most fully developed in these primates, similar structures can be found in some other mammals, such as marsupials, treeshrews, and colugos. This "second tongue" lacks taste buds, and in lemuriforms, it is thought to be used to remove hair and other debris from the toothcomb, a specialized dental structure used to comb the fur during oral grooming.

A rigid structure called the plica mediana or lytta runs from the front to the back, down the center of the sublingua to give it support. The plica mediana is usually made of cartilage and attaches the sublingua to the underside of the tongue. In lemuriforms, the sublingua mostly consists of two plicae fimbriatae (singular: plica fimbriata), which run along the sides of the plica mediana and end in comb-like serrated edges that are hardened with keratin. The plicae fimbriatae move freely over a limited range. The plica sublingualis, which is found in all primates, but is particularly small in lemuriforms, attaches the tongue and sublingua to the floor of the mouth. Tarsiers have a large but highly generalized sublingua, but their closest living relatives, monkeys and apes, lack one.

The sublingua is thought to have evolved from specialized folds of tissue below the tongue, which can be seen in some marsupials and other mammals. Simians do not have a sublingua, but the fimbria linguae found on the underside of ape tongues may be a vestigial version of the sublingua. Because of widely variable appearance of sublingual tissue in primates, the term "sublingua" is often confused with the frenal lamella, lingual frenulum, and other sublingual tissues.

== Anatomical structure ==
The sublingua, or "under-tongue", is a secondary tongue located below the primary tongue in tarsiers, lemuriform primates, and some other mammals. This structure does not have taste buds or salivary glands. In lemuriforms, the sublingua is relatively large and its front edge is usually lined with keratinized serrations (sometimes called "denticles").

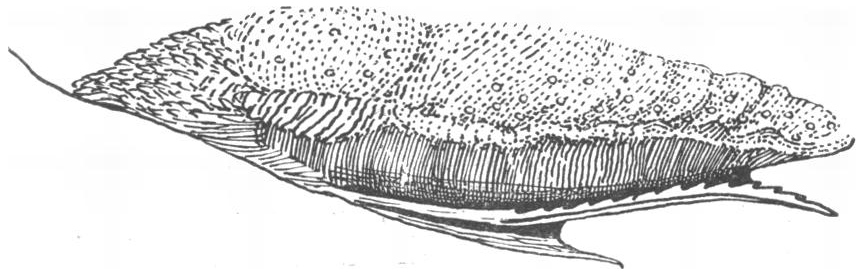
The serrated edges of a strepsirrhine sublingua are part of the plicae fimbriatae, while the plica sublingualis, which attaches the sublingua and tongue to the floor of the mouth, is small.

Down the middle of the sublingua is a thick strengthening rod called the plica mediana or lytta, which connects the sublingua to the underside of the tongue, and is part of the lingual septum (septum of the tongue). The thickness and size of the plica mediana can vary between species, and except in treeshrews, it is cartilaginous and provides support for the sublingua.

Only the serrated and often keratinized tip of the sublingua is free to move small distances along the underside of the tongue, while the majority of its length adheres to the underside of the tongue. These free-moving folds or filaments are called the plica fimbriata and attach to the base of the sublingua and are supported at the midline by the plica mediana. The plica fimbriata is highly developed and specialized in lemurs, and makes up the majority of the sublingua.

The fold that connects the back of the sublingua and tongue to the rear floor of the mouth is called the plica sublingualis. In lemurs, this is an underdeveloped structure consisting of only a tiny outgrowth on the floor of the mouth. The point where the plica sublingualis attaches to the rear floor of the mouth marks the location of the submandibular salivary glands.

=== Differences between species ===
In the aye-aye, the sublingua is not shaped like a brush like it is in most lemurs. Instead, there is a thickened area along the plica mediana or lytta which has a hook-shaped structure on the end. Within cheirogaleids, the sublingua lacks cartilage, and the sublingua of the gray mouse lemur has a distinct plica mediana and ends in two lobe-like projections that lack keratinized serrations, but have three keratinized ridges which make the sublingua rigid.

In tarsiers, the sublingua does not have serrations along its tip and is much simpler and generalized in structure, making it clearly distinguishable from that of the lemuriform primates. The tarsier has a distinct plica mediana and its plicae fimbriatae are large and stick to the entire underside of the tongue. The plica sublingualis is also prominent.

Marsupials such as opossums and the common brushtail possum have also developed noticeable sublingua with a plica mediana and a less specialized, but conspicuous, plica fimbriata.

== Function ==
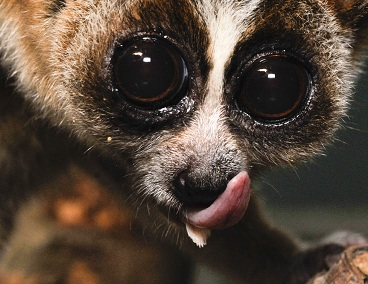
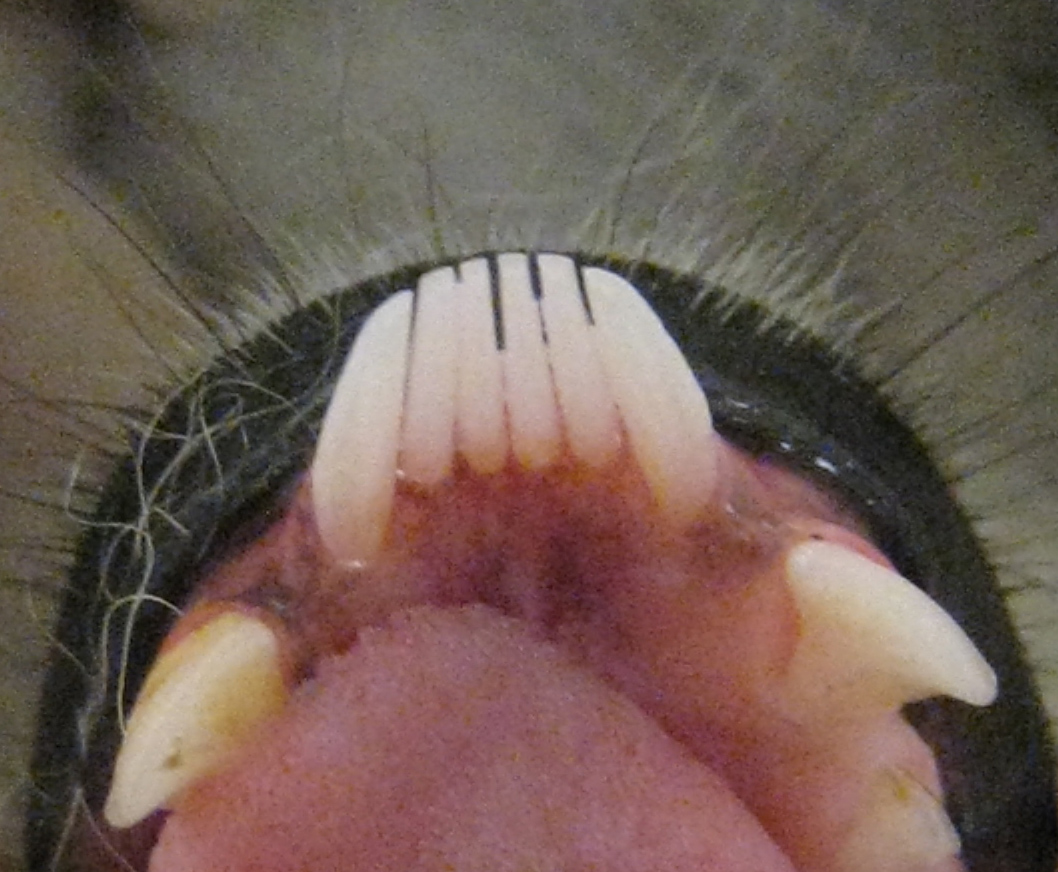
The sublingua (above) is a secondary tongue below the primary tongue and is used to remove hair and debris from the toothcomb (below) of lemurs and other lemuriform primates.

Originally, the sublingua in lemurs was thought to be a vestigial organ inherited from their mammalian ancestors. In lemuriform primates, the sublingua is used to remove hair and debris from the highly specialized toothcomb, an arrangement of four or six long, forward-facing teeth in the lower jaw used in oral grooming. The toothcomb of lemuriforms consists of both incisors and canine teeth (which reinforce the incisors), and together, these finely spaced teeth act like teeth on a comb. Although the cleaning function has been suspected for nearly a century, there has been no clear confirmation of this. However, a study from 1941 presented evidence that the toothcomb accumulated a mat of hair during oral grooming, and the author did observe that lemurs extend and retract their tongue rapidly, possibly to use the sublingua to clean the toothcomb.

In the aye-aye, which has replaced the toothcomb by evolving continually growing, rodent-like incisors, the hook-shaped tip of the sublingua fits precisely within the gap between the two lower incisors and keeps the area clean. Tarsiers lack a toothcomb, which may explain why their sublingua lacks the serrations typically found on the sublingua of lemuriforms. Although colugos also have a toothcomb, consisting of serrated edges on the tips of their incisors instead of finely spaced, elongated teeth, they do not have a sublingua. Instead, their toothcomb is cleaned by the tongue, which has serrated edges at the front that match the serrations on the incisors.

== Evolution and development ==
The sublingua in lemuriform primates and tarsiers may have evolved from the specialized folds of tissue below that tongue, as seen in some marsupials, such as sugar gliders, as well as some embryonic eutherian mammals, such as whales and dogs. It is also found in some adult eutherian mammals, such as treeshrews, colugos, and rodents. The sublingua of treeshrews, close relatives of primates, is less developed than in lemuriforms and tarsiers, but suggests a phylogenetic relationship.

The sublingua in lemuriform primates is fully developed and particularly unique. Tarsiers, which are most closely related to monkeys and apes (collectively called simians), also have a well-developed but non-specialized sublingua. Simians, however, do not have a sublingua, although some, such as titis have a highly specialized frenal lamella (plica sublingualis). All primates have a plica sublingualis, and the fimbria linguae (plica fimbriata) found under the tongue of apes may be a vestigial version, although that is still disputed. The structure and appearance of the sublingua, frenal lamella, lingual frenulum, and other sublingual tissue vary greatly between primates, and as a result, their terminology is often confused.

In the species that have cartilage in the sublingua or lytta, that cartilage is not derived from the hyoid bone or hyoid arch (the bone and cartilage that supports the tongue). Instead, the cartilage of the sublingua is a separately developed structure specifically adapted to support the sublingua.
