= Toothcomb =

Dental structure found in some mammals

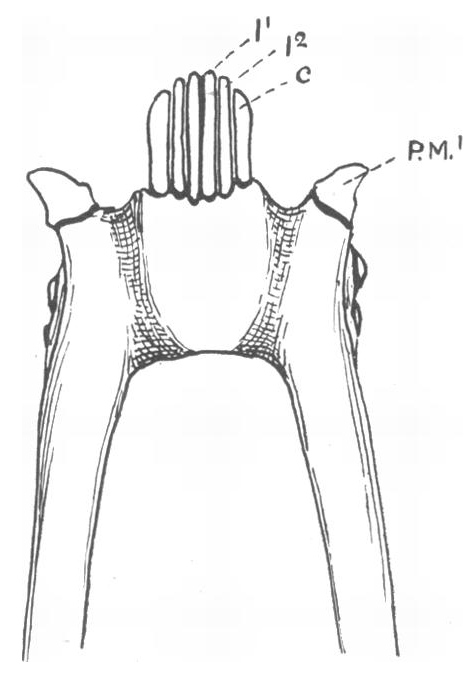
The lemuriform toothcomb, viewed from the underside of the lower jaw

A toothcomb (also called a tooth comb or dental comb) is a dental structure found in some mammals, comprising a group of front teeth arranged in a manner that facilitates grooming, similar to a hair comb. The toothcomb occurs in lemuriform primates (which include lemurs and lorisoids), treeshrews, colugos, hyraxes, and some African antelopes. The structures evolved independently in different types of mammals through convergent evolution and vary both in dental composition and structure. In most mammals the comb is formed by a group of teeth with fine spaces between them. The toothcombs in most mammals include incisors only, while in lemuriform primates they include incisors and canine teeth that tilt forward at the front of the lower jaw, followed by a canine-shaped first premolar. The toothcombs of colugos and hyraxes take a different form with the individual incisors being serrated, providing multiple tines per tooth.

The toothcomb is usually used for grooming. While licking the fur clean, the animal will run the toothcomb through the fur to comb it. Fine grooves or striations are usually cut into the teeth during grooming by the hair and may be seen on the sides of the teeth when viewed through a scanning electron microscope. The toothcomb is kept clean by either the tongue or, in the case of lemuriforms, the sublingua, a specialized "under-tongue". The toothcomb can have other functions, such as food procurement and bark gouging. Within lemuriforms, fork-marked lemurs and indriids have more robust toothcombs to support these secondary functions. In some lemurs, such as the aye-aye, the toothcomb has been lost completely and replaced with other specialized dentition.

In lemuriform primates, the toothcomb has been used by scientists in the interpretation of the evolution of lemurs and their kin. They are thought to have evolved from early adapiform primates around the Eocene or earlier. One popular hypothesis is that they evolved from European adapids, but the fossil record suggests that they evolved from an older lineage that migrated to Africa during the Paleocene (66 to 55 mya) and might have evolved from early cercamoniines from Asia. Fossil primates such as Djebelemur, 'Anchomomys' milleri, and Plesiopithecus may have been their closest relatives. The lack of a distinct toothcomb in the fossil record before to 40 mya has created a conflict with molecular clock studies that suggest an older divergence between lemurs and lorisoids, and the existence of a ghost lineage of lemuriform primates in Africa.

== Homologous and analogous structures ==
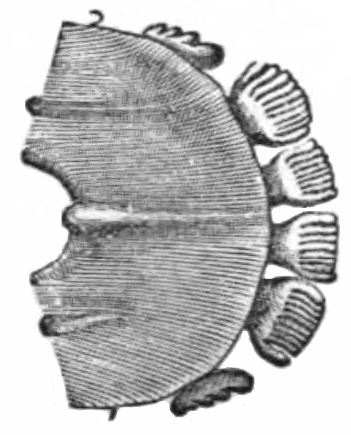
The toothcomb of a colugo differs significantly in shape from that of lemuriform primates.

The toothcomb, a special morphological arrangement of teeth in the anterior lower jaw, is best known in extant strepsirrhine primates, which include lemurs and lorisoid primates (collectively known as lemuriforms (Note: Although the monophyletic relationship between lemurs and lorisoids is widely accepted, their clade name is not. The term "strepsirrhine" has been used as a wastebasket taxon for non-haplorhine primates, most of whom do not exhibit the characteristic toothcomb, and "lemuriform" has been problematic because of its historical membership of living and fossil primates, which included the Malagasy lemurs and European adapids, but excluded the lorisoids. The term "lemuriforms" is used here because it derives from one popular taxonomy that clumps the toothcombed primates into one infraorder and the extinct, non-toothcombed adapiforms into another, both within the suborder Strepsirrhini.)). This homologous structure is a diagnostic character that helps define this clade (related group) of primates. An analogous trait is found in the bald uakari (Cacajao calvus), a type of New World monkey.

Toothcombs can also be found in colugos and treeshrews, both close relatives of primates; however, the structures are different and these are considered examples of convergent evolution. Likewise, small- or medium-sized African antelopes, such as the impala (Aepyceros melampus), have a similar structure sometimes referred to as the "lateral dental grooming apparatus". Living and extinct hyraxes (hyracoids) also exhibit a toothcomb, although the number of tines in the comb varies throughout the fossil record.

Dating to the Eocene epoch over 50 mya, Chriacus and Thryptacodon—two types of arctocyonids (primitive placental mammals)—also possessed an independently evolved toothcomb.

== Anatomical structure ==
The toothcomb of most lemuriforms includes six finely spaced teeth, four incisors and two canine teeth that are procumbent (tilt forward) in the front of the mouth. The procumbent lower canine teeth are the same shape as the incisors located between them, but they are more robust and curve upward and inward, more so than the incisors. In the permanent dentition, the canines erupt after the incisors. The crowns of the incisors are also angled in the direction of the forward tilt, and the crowns of both the incisors and canines are elongated and compressed side-to-side. The apical ridge, following along the front edges of the toothcomb teeth, is V-shaped in most lemuriforms, tapering off from the midline. As a result of this dental reconfiguration, the upper and lower incisors do not contact one another, and often the upper incisors are reduced or lost completely.

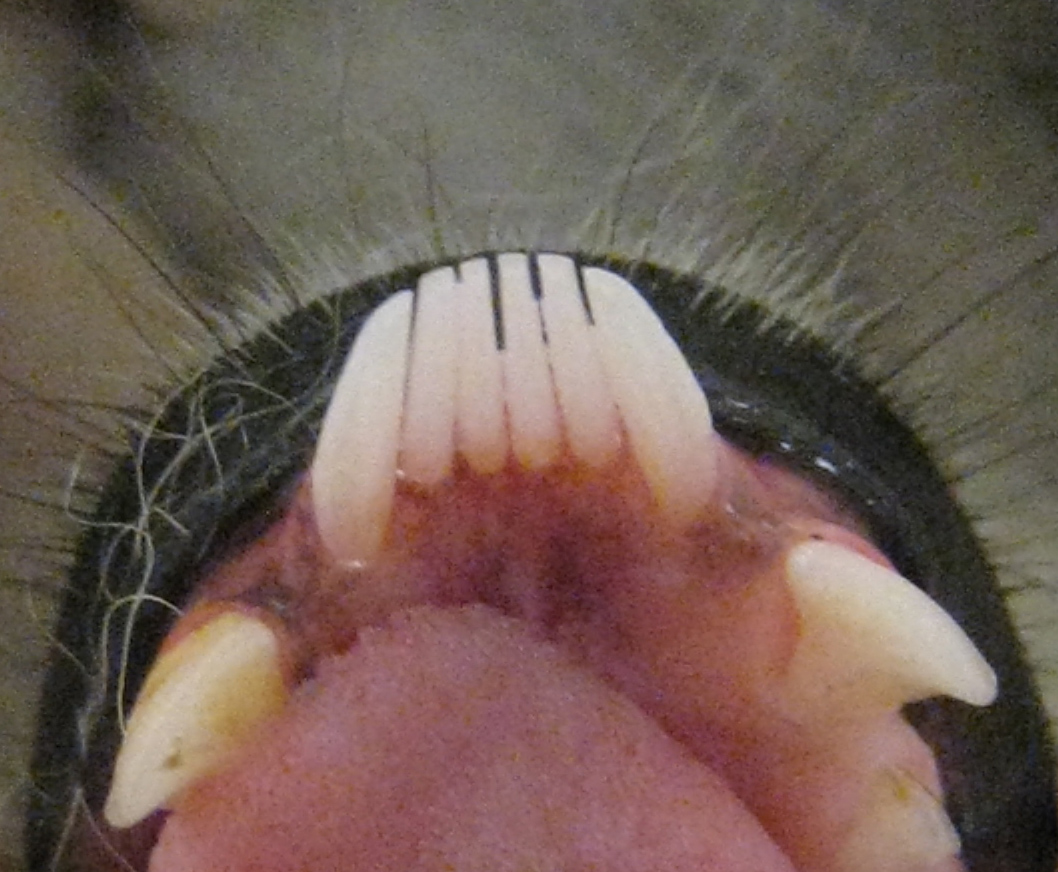
Toothcomb of a ring-tailed lemur, with canine-like premolars behind it

The French anatomist Henri Marie Ducrotay de Blainville first identified the two lateral teeth of the lemuriform toothcomb as canines in 1840. Canine teeth are normally used to pierce or grasp objects. With modified lower canine teeth, the first lower premolars following the toothcomb are usually shaped like typical canine teeth (caniniform) and assume their function. These premolars are commonly confused with canines. Normally the true canines in the lower jaw sit in front of the upper canines, and in toothcombed primates, the caniniform premolars rest behind it.

The lemuriform toothcomb is kept clean by the sublingua or "under-tongue", a specialized muscular structure that acts like a toothbrush to remove hair and other debris. The sublingua can extend below the end of the tongue and is tipped with keratinized, serrated points that rake between the front teeth.

Among lemurs, the toothcomb is variable in structure. Among indriids (Indriidae), the toothcomb is less procumbent and consists of four teeth instead of six. The indriid toothcomb is more robust and wider, with shorter incisors, wider spaces between the teeth (interdental spaces), and a broader apical ridge. It is unclear whether this four-toothed toothcomb consists of two pairs of incisors or one pair of incisors and one pair of canines. In fork-marked lemurs (Phaner) the toothcomb is more compressed, with significantly reduced interdental spaces. All six teeth are longer, straighter, and form a more continuous apical ridge. In the recently extinct monkey lemurs (Archaeolemuridae) and sloth lemurs (Palaeopropithecidae), the toothcomb was lost and the incisors and canines resumed a typical configuration in the front of the mouth. The aye-aye also lost its toothcomb, replacing it with continually growing (hypselodont) front teeth, similar to the incisors of rodents.

In colugos, the toothcomb has a completely different structure. Instead of individual incisors and canine teeth being finely spaced to act like the teeth of a comb, the biting edge of the four incisors has become serrated with as many as 15 tines each, while the canine acts more like a molar. These serrated incisors are kept clean using the front of the tongue, which is serrated to match the serrations of the incisors. Similarly, the hyracoid toothcomb consists of incisors with multiple tines, called "pectinations". In contrast to the colugos, the size and shape of the tines are more uniform.

The toothcomb of treeshrews is like the lemuriform toothcomb in that it uses interdental spaces to form the comb tines, but only two of its three pairs of lower incisors are included in the toothcomb and the canines are also excluded. The lateral two incisors in the toothcomb are generally larger. In the extinct arctocyonids, all six lower incisors were part of the toothcomb. In African antelopes, the toothcomb is strikingly similar to that of lemuriforms in that it consists of two pairs of incisors and a pair of canines.

== Functions ==
As a homologous structure in lemuriforms, the toothcomb serves variable biological roles, despite its superficially stereotypic shape and appearance. It is primarily used as a toiletry device or grooming comb. Additionally, some species use their toothcomb for food procurement or to gouge tree bark.

=== Grooming ===
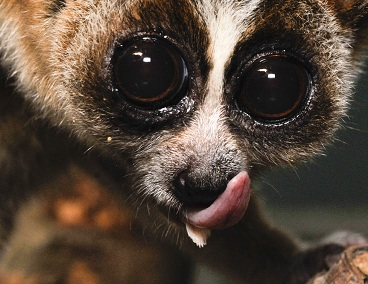
The sublingua is a secondary tongue below the primary tongue and is used to remove hair and debris from the toothcomb of lemuriforms.

The primary function of the toothcomb, grooming, was first noted by the French naturalist Georges Cuvier in 1829, who pointed out that the ring-tailed lemur (Lemur catta) had lower incisors that "sont de véritables peignes" ("are real combs"). More than 100 years later, the grooming function was questioned since it was difficult to observe and the interdental spaces were thought to be too small for fur. Observations later showed the teeth were used for that purpose and that immediately after grooming, hair may be found trapped in the teeth, but is removed by the sublingua later.

In 1981, scanning electron microscopy revealed fine grooves or striations on the teeth in lemuriform toothcombs. These grooves were only found on the sides of the teeth on the concave surfaces between the sides, as well as on the back ridge of the teeth. Between 10 and 20 μm wide, these grooves indicate that hair moved repeatedly across the teeth. (Note: Based on dental microwear patterns that are characteristic of dental combing, as well as the similarities between a laterally flared anterior incisor and the appearance of the lateral canine tooth in the lemuriform toothcomb, American physical anthropologist Jeffrey H. Schwartz suggested that tarsiers have a highly derived toothcomb, homologous with that of lemuriforms. However, studies of tarsier dentition showed that only some tarsier species exhibit the characteristic striations on their incisors, yet all the species examined were reported to use their front teeth when grooming, suggesting the presence or absence of striations can be affected by grooming frequency, fur thickness, or interdental spacing. Dental combing (as a function of the teeth with or without a toothcomb) has also been documented in early primates from the late Eocene. Necrolemur, a type of European microchoerid (close relatives of tarsier-like omomyids), lacked a toothcomb but showed signs of dental microwear attributed to dental combing.) Inside these grooves were even finer grooves, less than 1 μm, created by abrasion with the cuticular layer of the hair.

Among non-primates, the extinct Chriacus exhibits microscopic groves on its toothcomb, but the Philippine colugo (Cynocephalus volans) does not. The toothcomb of the colugos is generally considered to function as a toothcomb, but due to the lack of striations on the teeth and no documented observations of toothcomb use during oral grooming, its use seems to be limited to food procurement.

In African antelopes, the lateral dental grooming apparatus does not appear to be used during grazing or browsing. Instead, it is used during grooming when the head sweeps upward in a distinctive motion. It is thought to comb the fur and remove ectoparasites.

=== Olfaction in lemuriforms ===
In lemuriform primates, the toothcomb may also play a secondary role in olfaction, which may account for the size reduction of the poorly studied upper incisors. The toothcomb may provide pressure to stimulate glandular secretions which are then spread through the fur. Furthermore, the size reduction of the upper incisors may create a gap between the teeth (interincisal diastema) that connects the philtrum (a cleft in the middle of the wet nose, or rhinarium) to the vomeronasal organ in the roof of the mouth. This would allow pheromones to be more easily transferred to the vomeronasal organ.

=== Food procurement and other uses ===
Mouse lemurs (Microcebus), sifakas (Propithecus), and the indri (Indri) use their toothcombs to scoop up fruit pulp. Other small lemuriforms, such as fork-marked lemurs (Phaner), the hairy-eared dwarf lemur (Allocebus), and galagos (particularly the genera Galago and Euoticus) use their toothcombs to tooth-scrape plant exudates, such as gum and sap. In fork-marked lemurs, the toothcomb is specially adapted to minimize food trapment since the interdental spaces are greatly reduced. The herbivorous colugos in the genus Cynocephalus may also use their toothcomb for food procurement.

Indriids such as the sifakas use their toothcombs to gouge bark or dead wood (bark-prising), which is done before scent-marking with the gland on their chest. The more robust structure of their toothcomb is thought to help it withstand the compressive forces experienced during regular bark-prising.

== Evolution in lemuriforms ==
The origins of the lemuriform toothcomb and the clade it characterizes have been the center of considerable debate for more than a century. In 1920, British palaeoanthropologist Wilfrid Le Gros Clark proposed that the toothcomb found in treeshrews (which he believed were primates) was an early version of the dental structure found in lemuriforms. Because he viewed the fossil lorisoids from the Miocene as not having fully developed the modern lemuriform toothcomb, he implied that lemurs and lorisoids had evolved the trait independently. This view was later overturned, and the monophyletic relationship between lemurs and lorisoids is now accepted.

The ancestral condition of the anterior dentition on the lower jaw, based on Eocene primate fossils, suggests that earliest primates had lacked a differentiated toothcomb. Most fossil strepsirrhines lacked the stereotypic lemuriform toothcomb. Collectively, early strepsirrhine primates are known as adapiforms. Adapiforms are considered to be a paraphyletic group (containing many but not all of the descendants of the last common ancestor of the group's members) because the lemuriforms are assumed to have evolved from one of several groups of adapiforms. In terms of ecology, the evolution of the toothcomb is assumed to have required a folivorous (leaf-eating) diet among the ancestral adapiform population, since that would select for reduced incisors, which would serve as an exaptation (a trait with adaptive value for something other than what it was originally selected for), which could then be used for personal or social grooming. However, the inclusion of the canines into the toothcomb must have required exceptional conditions, since large lemuriforms have secondarily modified caniniform premolars to substitute for the loss.

A popular hypothesis about the origins of the lemuriform clade is that they evolved from European adapiforms known as adapids. In some adapids, the crests of the lower incisors and canines align to form functional cropping unit, and the American paleontologist Philip D. Gingerich has suggested this foreshadowed the development of the lemuriform toothcomb. However, no lemuriform toothcomb has been found in the fossil record of the Eocene, and the European adapid lower jaws from that time did not resemble the derived state seen in lemuriforms.

Lemuriforms are currently thought to have evolved in Africa, and the earliest known strepsirrhine primates from Africa are azibiids from the early Eocene, which likely descended from a very early colonization of the Afro-Arabian land mass in the Paleocene (66 to 55 mya). Stem lemuriforms, including Djebelemur and 'Anchomomys' milleri, have been found in Africa and date from 50 to 48 mya and were very distinct from European adapiforms. However, they lack a toothcomb. These stem lemuriforms suggest an early common ancestry with cercamoniines from outside of Europe. (Note: Cercamoniines were an early branch of strepsirrhine primates that occupied the northern hemisphere during the early Paleogene. They originated in Asia and are considered a subfamily of the notharctids, extinct North American primates that resembled modern lemurs.) Based on large, procumbent lower teeth, Plesiopithecus, a fossil primate found in late Eocene deposits at the Fayum Depression in Egypt, is thought to be most closely related to lemuriforms. Together, Djebelemur, ‘Anchomomys’ milleri, and Plesiopithecus are considered to be sister taxa (the closest relatives) of lemuriform primates.

=== Dating inconsistencies ===
Although stem lemuriforms like Djebelemur may have been contemporaneous with related toothcombed primates around 50 to 48 mya, the sparse African fossil record suggests toothcomb differentiation occurred around 52 to 40 mya according to the French paleoanthropologist Marc Godinot. This would conflict with the molecular clock estimates by evolutionary anthropologist Anne Yoder and others, which predict lemur–lorisoid divergence dating between 61 and 90.8 mya.

In 2001, the discovery of Bugtilemur, a fossil primate from Pakistan dating to the Oligocene and initially thought to be a cheirogaleid lemur, further challenged the theory of lemur origins; however, it was later shown to be a type of adapiform primate and not a lemur.

The minimum paleontological estimate for the divergence of lemurs and lorisoids nearly doubled when additional discoveries were made in northern Egypt during the 2000s of a stem galagid (Saharagalago) and a stem or crown lorisoid (Karanisia) dating to 37 and 40 mya respectively. Karanisia is the oldest fossil primate to exhibit a distinct lemuriform toothcomb. This, as well as studies of other African adapiforms like ‘Anchomomys’ milleri, suggests a more ancient ghost lineage for lemuriforms in Africa.

=== Original function of the lemuriform toothcomb ===
The selective pressure that shaped the original lemuriform toothcomb has been a topic of considerable debate since the 1970s. Evidence can be seen as supporting a grooming function, food procurement function, or both. In the early 1900s, there was less debate. Grooming was seen as the primary function since primates lack the claws needed to adequately comb the fur, although prosimian primates (strepsirrhines and tarsiers) possess at least one grooming claw on each foot to compensate. Grooming—in the form of fur-combing—is generally considered the primary function and original role of the lemuriform toothcomb, and subsequent changes in morphology across multiple lineages have altered its function and obscured its original function.

The hypothesis that the toothcomb evolved for food procurement was based on observations of recent lemuriform taxa, such as cheirogaleid lemurs (particularly fork-marked lemurs and the hairy-eared dwarf lemur) and galagos, which demonstrate tooth-scraping of plant exudates, as well as sifakas, which practice bark-prising. Each of these were considered "primitive" forms among the living strepsirrhines, suggesting the first lemuriforms exhibited similar behaviors. Also, strong selective pressure from feeding ecology placed on the anterior dentition was emphasized, based on the specialized upper anterior dentition seen in the recently extinct koala lemurs (Megaladapis). If feeding ecology could have such profound effects on the shape of the anterior dentition, then convergent evolution might explain the similarities seen between the compressed lower incisors of the lemuriform toothcomb and the exudate feeding adaptations in the genus Callithrix (a type of marmoset).

In contrast, the grooming hypothesis emphasized that all lemuriforms use their toothcombs for grooming, and long, thin teeth are poorly suited for the mechanical stress of gouging and exudate feeding. Also the interdental spaces seen in most lemuriforms favor fur combing and would also promote bacterial growth and tooth decay if used for exudate feeding. Supporting this, reduced interdental spacing is found in exudate feeding lemuriforms. Furthermore, the canine included in the toothcomb provides additional interdental spacing for fur combing. Even the behavior of young lemuriforms suggests that grooming plays a more important role in the use of the toothcomb than food procurement.
