= Shizarodon =

Shizarodon Temporal range: Early Oligocene

Scientific classification
- Domain: Eukaryota
- Kingdom: Animalia
- Phylum: Chordata
- Class: Mammalia
- Order: Primates
- Suborder: Strepsirrhini
- Family: †Djebelemuridae
- Genus: †Shizarodon; Gheerbrant et al., 1993
- Species: †S. dhofarensis

Binomial name
- †Shizarodon dhofarensis Gheerbrant et al., 1993

Extinct genus of primates

Shizarodon is a genus of primate related to lemuriforms that lived in Oman during the early Oligocene.
