= Omanodon =

Omanodon Temporal range: Early Oligocene

Scientific classification
- Domain: Eukaryota
- Kingdom: Animalia
- Phylum: Chordata
- Class: Mammalia
- Order: Primates
- Suborder: Strepsirrhini
- Family: †Djebelemuridae
- Genus: †Omanodon; Gheerbrant et al., 1993
- Species: †O. minor

Binomial name
- †Omanodon minor Gheerbrant et al., 1993

Extinct genus of primates

Omanodon is a genus of primate related to lemuriforms that lived in Oman during the early Oligocene.
