= Notnamaia =

Notnamaia Temporal range: Early Middle Eocene

Scientific classification
- Kingdom: Animalia
- Phylum: Chordata
- Class: Mammalia
- Order: Primates
- Suborder: Strepsirrhini
- Family: †Djebelemuridae
- Genus: †Notnamaia; Pickford & Uhen, 2014
- Species: †N. bogenfelsi

Binomial name
- †Notnamaia bogenfelsi (Pickford et al., 2008)

Synonyms
- Namaia bogenfelsi Pickford et al., 2008 (Preoccupied)

Extinct genus of primates

Notnamaia is a genus of primates that lived in Africa during the early middle Eocene. It contains one species, N. bogenfelsi. Its describers considered it to be an early simian, but other researchers have generally placed it within Strepsirrhini, possibly aligned with the djebelemurids or caenopithecines.
