= Djebelemuridae =

Djebelemuridae Temporal range: Early to Late Eocene

Scientific classification
- Kingdom: Animalia
- Phylum: Chordata
- Class: Mammalia
- Order: Primates
- Suborder: Strepsirrhini
- Infraorder: incertae sedis
- Family: †Djebelemuridae; Hartenberger & Marandat, 1992

Genera
- †'Anchomomys' Stehlin, 1916 (Note: In 2006, Godinot noted that 'Anchomomys' milleri requires a new generic designation because it does not belong in the genus Anchomomys, which contains cercamoniine adapiforms found in Europe. Both djebelemurids share more characteristics—and therefore share a close phylogenetic relationship—with African lemuriforms than Eocene European cercamoniines.); †Djebelemur Hartenberger & Marandat, 1992; †Notnamaia Pickford et al., 2008; †Omanodon Gheerbrant et al., 1993; †Shizarodon Gheerbrant et al., 1993

Extinct family of primates

Djebelemuridae is an extinct family of early strepsirrhine primates from Africa. It consists of five genera. The organisms in this family were exceptionally small, and were insectivores. This family dates to the early to late Eocene. Although they gave rise to the crown strepsirrhines, which includes today's lemurs and lorisoids, they lacked the toothcomb that identifies that group.
