= Bugtilemur =

Bugtilemur Temporal range: Early Oligocene

Scientific classification
- Domain: Eukaryota
- Kingdom: Animalia
- Phylum: Chordata
- Class: Mammalia
- Order: Primates
- Suborder: Strepsirrhini
- Family: †incertae sedis
- Genus: †Bugtilemur; Marivaux et al., 2001
- Species: †B. mathesoni

Binomial name
- †Bugtilemur mathesoni Marivaux et al., 2001

Extinct genus of primates

Bugtilemur is an extinct genus of Strepsirhine primate belonging to the adapiform family Ekgmowechashalidae.It is represented by only one species, B. mathesoni, which was found in the Chitarwata Formation of Pakistan.

When first described, Bugtilemur was classified in the lemur family Cheirogaleidae, complicating the picture of the early evolution of lemurs by suggesting that lemurs originated in Asia.

Described from a few teeth, the specimen possesses a lower canine that, according to Marivaux et al., confirms the presence of the strepsirrhine-specific toothcomb. Furthermore, on the basis of cheektooth morphology, the molars share strong affinities with those of the genus Cheirogaleus (dwarf lemurs). However, Bugtilemur appears to be much smaller than the extant Malagasy genus and its toothcomb was shorter and broader. More recently, the structure and general presence of the toothcomb in Bugtilemur has been questioned, as well as many other dental features, suggesting that it is most likely an adapiform. The adapiform nature of Bugtilemur was confirmed in a 2016 cladistic analysis that recovered it in the family Ekgmowechashalidae, which is more consistent with the lemur fossil record.

== See also ==
- Karanisia
