= Fimbriated fold of tongue =

Fold on underside of tongue

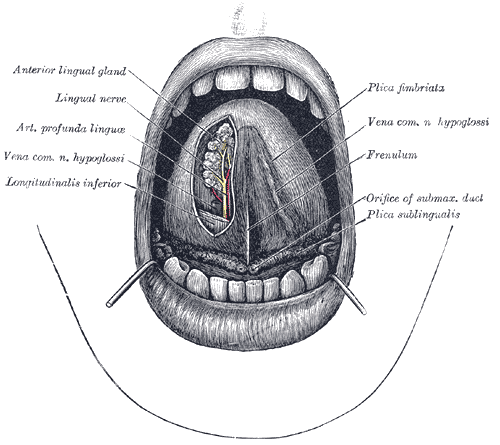
- The mouth cavity. The apex of the tongue is turned upward, and on the right side a superficial dissection of its under surface has been made. (Plica fimbriata labeled at upper right.)

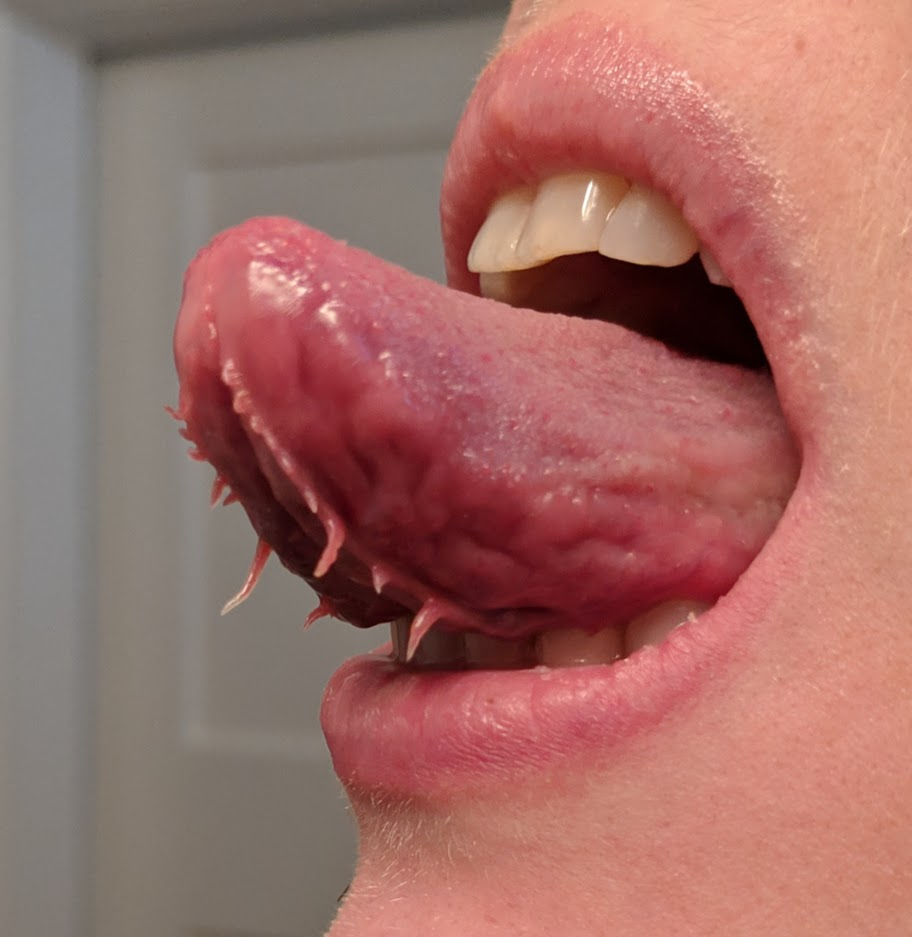
- Prominent fringed fimbriated folds.

Details

Identifiers
- Latin: plica fimbriata

The fimbriated fold of tongue, also plica fimbriata, is a slight fold of the mucous membrane on the underside of the tongue which runs laterally on either side of the frenulum. The free edge of the fimbriated fold occasionally exhibits a series of fringe-like processes. (Fimbria is Latin for fringe).

Some people have small (<1 cm) horn-like triangular flaps of "skin" (mucosa) under their tongue. They are on each side of the frenulum (the piece of tissue connecting the bottom of the tongue to the inside of the mouth) under the tongue and run parallel next to the two distinct veins. They typically appear in pairs and may even be up to 4 or more sets, but for even those who have them only two closer to the tip are distinctly visible while the others are very minor or just small bumps. These are the "fringe-like processes" part of the "fimbriated fold".

They are normal residual tissue not completely reabsorbed by the body during the development and growth of the tongue.

== See also ==
- Frenulum of tongue
