= Anchomomys =

Anchomomys Temporal range: 47.8–33.9 Ma Middle Eocene to Late Eocene

Scientific classification
- Kingdom: Animalia
- Phylum: Chordata
- Class: Mammalia
- Order: Primates
- Suborder: Strepsirrhini
- Family: †Notharctidae
- Subfamily: †Cercamoniinae
- Genus: †Anchomomys; Stehlin, 1916

Type species
- †Anchomomys gaillardi Stehlin, 1916

Species
- A. crocheti; A. gaillardi; A. milleri; A. pygmaeus; A. quercyi

Extinct genus of primates

Anchomomys is an extinct genus of adapiform primate that lived in Europe and Africa during the Middle Eocene.

== Palaeobiology ==
=== Locomotion ===
Anchomomys frontanyensis is inferred to have been specialised for leaping due to its calcaneus exhibiting significant distal elongation.
