= 'Anchomomys' milleri =

'Anchomomys' milleri Temporal range: Late Eocene

Scientific classification
- Kingdom: Animalia
- Phylum: Chordata
- Class: Mammalia
- Order: Primates
- Suborder: Strepsirrhini
- Family: †Notharctidae
- Genus: †Anchomomys (?)
- Species: †A. milleri

Binomial name
- †Anchomomys milleri Simons, 1997

Extinct species of primate

'Anchomomys' milleri is an extinct primate related to lemuriforms that lived in Africa during the early late Eocene. It was originally thought to be a member of the European genus Anchomomys, but was later aligned with the djebelemurids, although a new generic name needs to be assigned.
