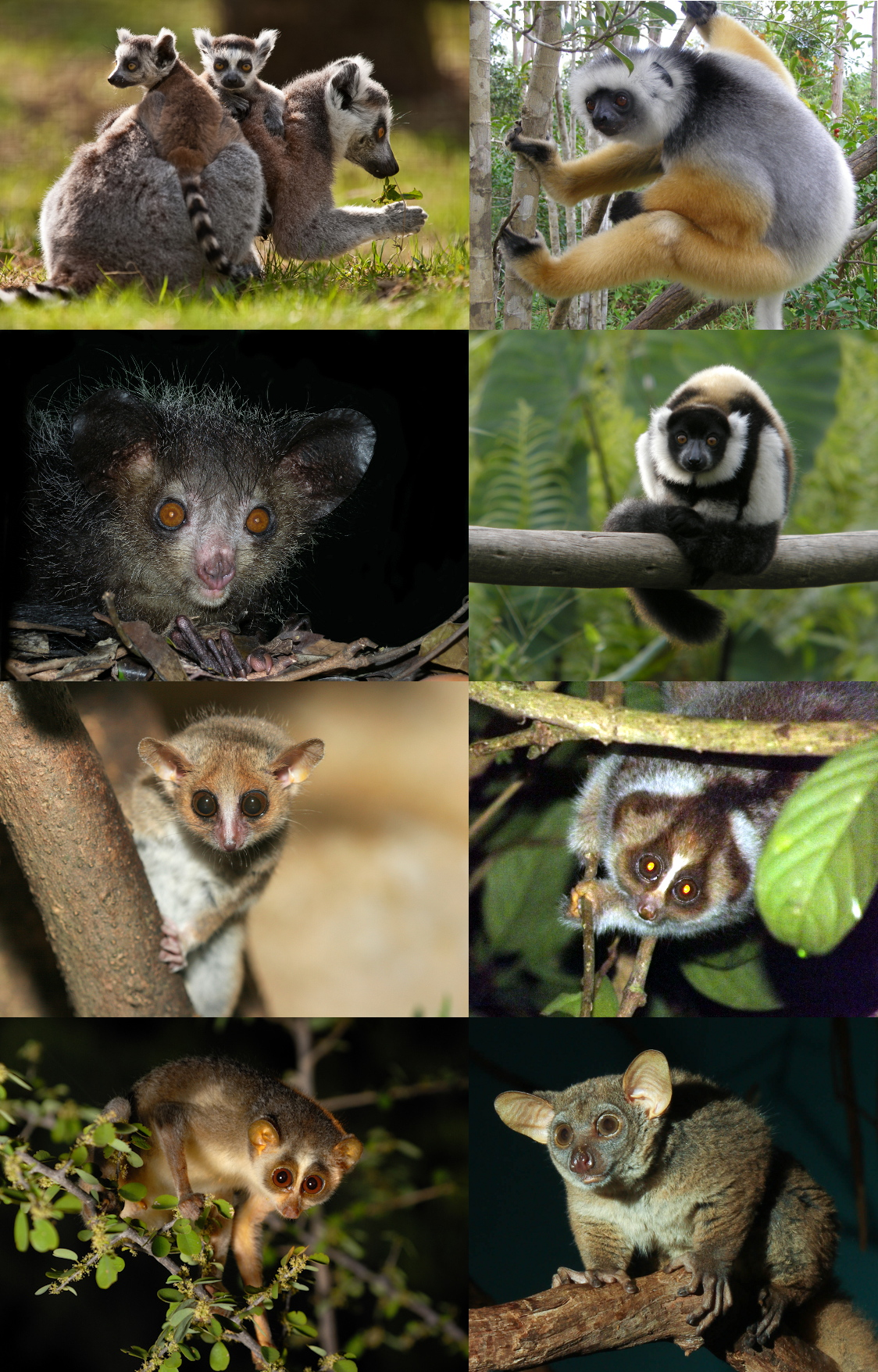
- A sample of lemuriform diversity; (Note: Although the monophyletic relationship between lemurs and lorisoids is widely accepted, their clade name is not. The term "lemuriform" is used here because it derives from one popular taxonomy that clumps the clade of toothcombed primates into one infraorder and the extinct, non-toothcombed adapiforms into another, both within the suborder Strepsirrhini. However, another popular alternative taxonomy places the lorisoids in their own infraorder, Lorisiformes.) 8 biological genera are depicted (from top, left to right): Lemur, Propithecus, Daubentonia, Varecia, Microcebus, Nycticebus, Loris, Otolemur.

Scientific classification
- Kingdom: Animalia
- Phylum: Chordata
- Class: Mammalia
- Order: Primates
- Suborder: Strepsirrhini
- Infraorder: Lemuriformes; Gray, 1821

Superfamilies
- Lemuroidea; Lorisoidea (See text)

= Lemuriformes =

Lemuriformes Temporal range: Eocene–Present, 40–0 Ma

Infraorder of primates

Lemuriformes is the sole extant infraorder of primate that falls under the suborder Strepsirrhini. It includes the lemurs of Madagascar, as well as the galagos and lorisids of Africa and Asia, although a popular alternative taxonomy places the lorisoids in their own infraorder, Lorisiformes.

Lemuriform primates are characterized by a toothcomb, a specialized set of teeth in the front, lower part of the mouth mostly used for combing fur during grooming.

== Evolutionary history ==
Lemuriform origins are unclear and debated. American paleontologist Philip Gingerich proposed that lemuriform primates evolved from one of several genera of European adapids based on similarities between the front lower teeth of adapids and the toothcomb of extant lemuriforms; however, this view is not strongly supported due to a lack of clear transitional fossils. Instead, lemuriforms may be descended from a very early branch of Asian cercamoniines or sivaladapids that immigrated to northern Africa.

Lemuriform phylogeny

- Euarchonta
  - Scandentia (treeshrews)
  - Dermoptera (colugos)
  - - †Plesiadapiformes
    - Primates
      - Haplorhini (tarsiers, monkeys, and apes)
      - Strepsirrhini
        - †Adapiformes
        - Lemuriformes
          - Lorisoids
          - Lemurs

Until discoveries of three 40-million-year-old fossil lorisoids (Karanisia, Saharagalago, and Wadilemur) in the El Fayum deposits of Egypt between 1997 and 2005, the oldest known lemuriforms had come from the early Miocene (~20 mya) of Kenya and Uganda. These newer finds demonstrate that lemuriform primates were present during the middle Eocene in Afro-Arabia and that the lemuriform lineage and all other strepsirrhine taxa had diverged before then. Djebelemur from Tunisia dates to the late early or early middle Eocene (52 to 46 mya) and has been considered a cercamoniine, but also may have been a stem lemuriform. Azibiids from Algeria date to roughly the same time and may be a sister group of the djebelemurids. Together with Plesiopithecus from the late Eocene Egypt, the three may qualify as the stem lemuriforms from Africa.

Molecular clock estimates indicate that lemurs and the lorisoids diverged in Africa during the Paleocene, approximately 62 mya. Between 47 and 54 mya, lemurs dispersed to Madagascar by rafting. In isolation, the lemurs diversified and filled the niches often filled by monkeys and apes today. In Africa, the lorises and galagos diverged during the Eocene, approximately 40 mya. Unlike the lemurs in Madagascar, they have had to compete with monkeys and apes, as well as other mammals.

== Taxonomic classification ==
Most of the academic literature provides a basic framework for primate taxonomy, usually including several potential taxonomic schemes. Although most experts agree upon phylogeny, many disagree about nearly every level of primate classification.

Within Strepsirrhini, two common classifications include either two infraorders (Adapiformes and Lemuriformes) or three infraorders (Adapiformes, Lemuriformes, Lorisiformes). A less common taxonomy places the aye-aye (Daubentoniidae) in its own infraorder, Chiromyiformes. In some cases, plesiadapiforms are included within the order Primates, in which case Euprimates is sometimes treated as a suborder, with Strepsirrhini becoming an infraorder, and the Lemuriformes and others become parvorders. Regardless of the infraordinal taxonomy, crown strepsirrhines are composed of 10 families, three of which are extinct. These three extinct families included the giant lemurs of Madagascar, many of which died out within the last 1,000 years following human arrival on the island.

Competing strepsirrhine taxonomic nomenclature
2 infraorders	3 infraorders	4 infraorders
Order Primates; Suborder Strepsirrhini; Infraorder †Adapiformes; Infraorder Lemuriformes; Superfamily Lemuroidea; Superfamily Lorisoidea; Suborder Haplorhini	Order Primates; Suborder Strepsirrhini; Infraorder †Adapiformes; Infraorder Lemuriformes; Superfamily Lemuroidea; Infraorder Lorisiformes; Superfamily Lorisoidea; Suborder Haplorhini	Order Primates; Suborder Strepsirrhini; †Infraorder Adapiformes; Infraorder Chiromyiformes; Infraorder Lemuriformes; Superfamily Cheirogaleoidea; Superfamily Lemuroidea; Infraorder Lorisiformes; Superfamily Lorisoidea; Suborder Haplorhini

When Strepsirrhini is divided into two infraorders, the clade containing all toothcombed primates can be called "lemuriforms". When it is divided into three infraorders, the term "lemuriforms" refers only to Madagascar's lemurs, and the toothcombed primates are referred to as either "crown strepsirrhines" or "extant strepsirrhines". Confusion of this specific terminology with the general term "strepsirrhine", along with oversimplified anatomical comparisons and vague phylogenetic inferences, can lead to misconceptions about primate phylogeny and misunderstandings about primates from the Eocene, as seen with the media coverage of Darwinius. Because the skeletons of adapiforms share strong similarities with those of lemurs and lorises, researchers have often referred to them as "primitive" strepsirrhines, lemur ancestors, or a sister group to the living strepsirrhines. They are included in Strepsirrhini, and are considered basal members of the clade. Although their status as true primates is not questioned, the questionable relationship between adapiforms and other living and fossil primates leads to multiple classifications within Strepsirrhini. Often, adapiforms are placed in their own infraorder due to anatomical differences with lemuriforms and their unclear relationship. When shared traits with lemuriforms (which may or may not be synapomorphic) are emphasized, they are sometimes reduced to families within the infraorder Lemuriformes (or superfamily Lemuroidea).
