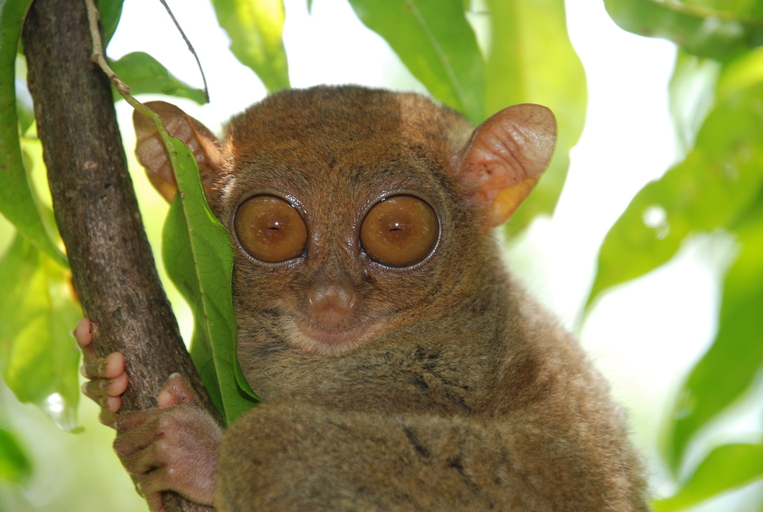
- Tarsiers are prosimian primates, but more closely related to monkeys and apes (simians) than to other prosimians.

Scientific classification
- Kingdom: Animalia
- Phylum: Chordata
- Class: Mammalia
- Infraclass: Placentalia
- Order: Primates
- (unranked): Prosimii; Illiger, 1811 (Note: The division of the order Primates into two evolutionary grades, Prosimii ("lower primates") and Anthropoidea ("higher primates") is sometimes used, but has been shown through morphological and genetic evidence to be incorrect. Alternatively, a three-way split in the order Primates—Prosimii, Tarsiiformes, and Anthropoidea—has also been suggested.)

Groups included
- Strepsirrhini (Note: Although the monophyletic relationship between lemurs and lorisoids is widely accepted, their clade name is not. The term "lemuriform" is used here because it derives from one popular taxonomy that clumps the clade of toothcombed primates into one infraorder and the extinct, non-toothcombed adapiforms into another, both within the suborder Strepsirrhini. However, another popular alternative taxonomy places the lorisoids in their own infraorder, Lorisiformes.) Tarsiiformes

Cladistically included but traditionally excluded taxa
- Simiiformes

= Prosimian =

Prosimian Temporal range: Early Eocene–Present

Obsolete primate taxon

Prosimians are a group of primates that includes all living and extinct strepsirrhines (lemurs, lorisoids, and adapiforms), as well as the haplorhine tarsiers and their extinct relatives, the omomyiforms, i.e. all primates excluding the simians. They are considered to have characteristics that are more "primitive" (ancestral or plesiomorphic) than those of simians (monkeys, apes, and humans).

Simians emerged within the Prosimians as sister group of the haplorhine tarsiers, and therefore cladistically belong to this group. Simians are thus distinctly closer related to tarsiers than lemurs are. Strepsirrhines bifurcated some 20 million years earlier than the tarsier–simian bifurcation. However, simians are traditionally excluded, rendering prosimians paraphyletic. Consequently, the term "prosimian" is no longer widely used in a taxonomic sense, but is still used to illustrate the behavioral ecology of tarsiers relative to the other primates.

Prosimians are the only primates native to Madagascar, but are also found throughout Africa and in Asia.

== Characteristics ==
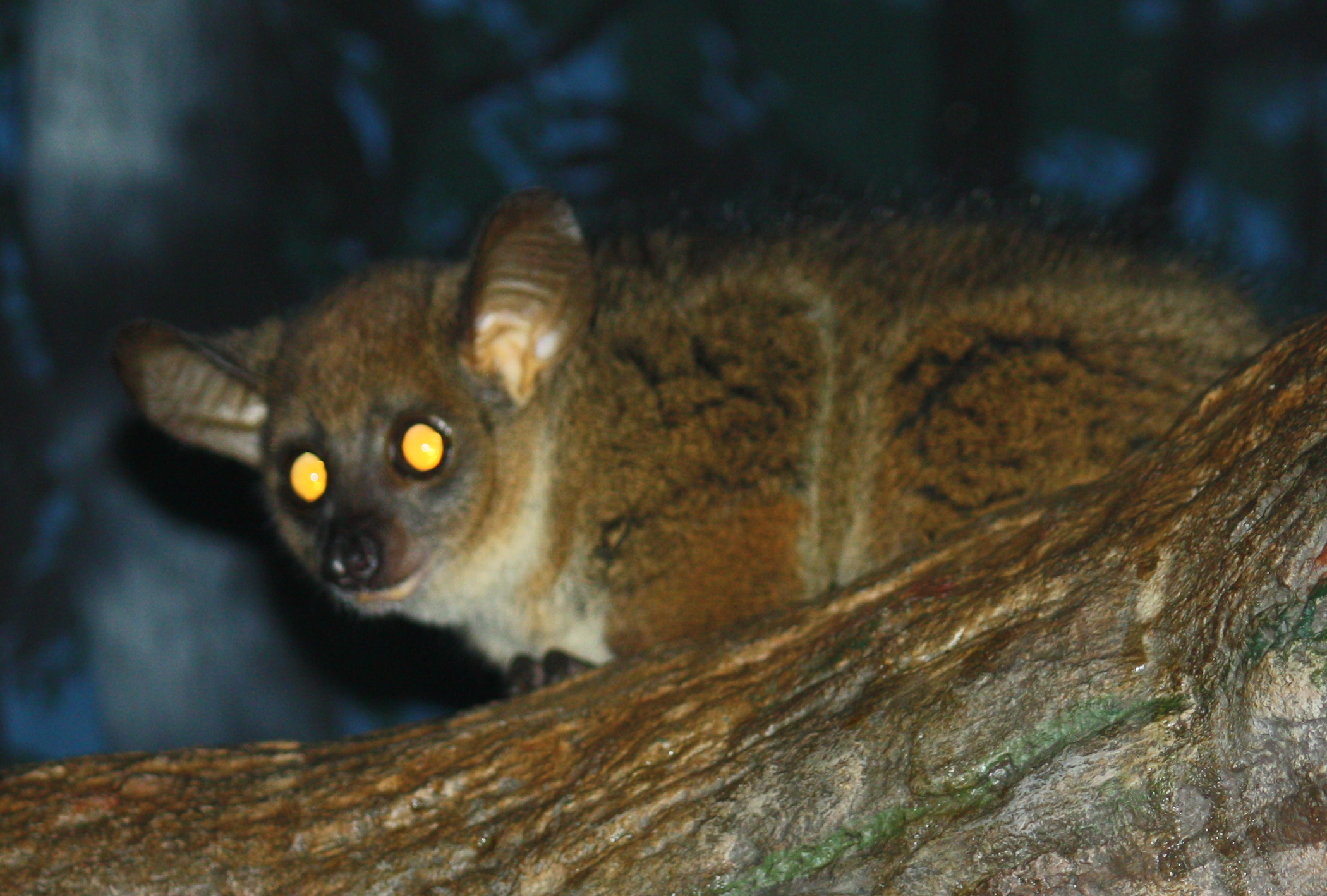
The tapetum lucidum of a galago, typical of prosimians, reflects the light of the photographer's flash.

Being an evolutionary grade rather than a clade, the prosimians are united by being primates with traits otherwise found in non-primate mammals. Their diets typically are less dominated by fruit than those of the simians, and many are active arboreal predators, hunting for insects and other small animals in the trees. All prosimians outside Madagascar are nocturnal, meaning that no prosimian competes directly with simian primates (the only nocturnal simians are New World monkeys of genus Aotus).

Related to their frequently nocturnal lifestyle, prosimians lack the colour vision of higher primates. Like most placental mammals, they are in effect red–green colour blind. This allows for more rod cells in the retina, which may enhance vision under low-light conditions. Except in tarsiers, the nocturnal vision is further augmented by a reflective tapetum lucidum behind the retina, similar to that found in other nocturnal mammals. This layer reflects the light that passes through the retina, increasing the photoreceptors exposure to the light. It is however not well developed in diurnal forms like many lemurs.

All prosimians possess two laterally flattened toilet claws, used for grooming. These are found on the second toe in lemurs and lorises, and the second and third in tarsiers. Aye-ayes have functional claws on all other digits except the hallux, including a toilet claw on the second toe. Clawlike nails are however also found in the small-bodied callitrichids, a group of New World monkeys, though none of them have a toilet claw.

Male strepsirrhine prosimians have relatively large bacula. Male tarsiers do not have bacula. The prosimians have retained the primitive mammalian condition of a bicornuate uterus, with two separate uterus chambers. In the simians, the uterus chambers have fused, an otherwise rare condition among mammals. Prosimians usually have litters rather than single offspring, which is the norm in higher primates.

While primates are often thought of as fairly intelligent animals, the prosimians are not very large-brained compared to other placental mammals. Their brain-cases are markedly smaller than those of simians of comparable sizes. In the large-eyed tarsiers, the weight of the brain is about the same as that of a single eye. Prosimians generally show lower cognitive ability and live in simpler social settings than the simians. The prosimians with the most complex social systems are the diurnal lemurs, which may live in social groups of 20 individuals. The nocturnal prosimians are mainly solitary.

== Classification ==
Primate phylogeny

- Primates
  - Strepsirrhini
    - Adapiformes
      †Adapiforms
    - Lemuriformes
      - Lemurs
      - Lorisoids
  - Haplorhini
    - Omomyiformes
      †Omomyiforms
    - Tarsiiformes
      Tarsiers
    - Simiiformes
      - Platyrrhini
        New World monkeys
      - Catarrhini
        - Old World monkeys
        - Apes & humans

Prosimians (in green brackets) are a paraphyletic group by including the tarsiers and omomyiforms to the exclusion of the simians (in red brackets).

The prosimians were once a group considered a suborder of the primate order (suborder Prosimii - Gr. pro, before, + Latin simius/simia, ape), which was named in 1811 by Johann Karl Wilhelm Illiger. They have been shown, however, to be paraphyletic - that is, their most recent common ancestor was a prosimian but it has some non-prosimian descendants (i.e. monkeys and apes). This relationship is shown by the ranks (prosimians in bold) in the list below of the current primate classification between the order and infraorder level. The term "prosimian" is considered taxonomically obsolete, although it is used to emphasize similarities between strepsirrhines, tarsiers, and the early primates.

- Order Primates
  - Suborder Strepsirrhini: non-tarsier prosimians
    - Infraorder †Adapiformes: extinct "lemur-like" primates
    - Infraorder Lemuriformes: lemurs, lorises, and bushbabies
  - Suborder Haplorrhini: tarsiers, monkeys and apes
    - Infraorder †Omomyiformes: extinct "tarsier-like" primates
    - Infraorder Tarsiiformes: tarsiers
    - Infraorder Simiiformes: New World monkeys, Old World monkeys, apes, and humans

== See also ==
- Evolution of mammals
- List of primates
