= Karanisia =

Karanisia Temporal range: Late Middle Eocene Priabonian

Scientific classification
- Kingdom: Animalia
- Phylum: Chordata
- Class: Mammalia
- Infraclass: Placentalia
- Order: Primates
- Suborder: Strepsirrhini
- Infraorder: incertae sedis
- Genus: †Karanisia; Seiffert et al, 2003

Type species
- †Karanisia clarki Seiffert et al., 2003

Species
- †Karanisia arenula Jaeger et al., 2010; †Karanisia clarki Seiffert et al., 2003

Extinct genus of primates

Karanisia is an extinct genus of strepsirrhine primate from Middle Eocene fossil deposits in Egypt.

== Classification ==
Two species are known, K. clarki and K. arenula. Originally considered a crown lorisid, more comprehensive phylogenetic analyses suggest it is a more basal to crown lorisiformes.

K. clarki was described in 2003 from isolated teeth and jaw fragments found in Late Middle Eocene (c. 40 million years ago) sediments of the Birket Qarun Formation in the Egyptian Faiyum. The specimens indicate the presence of a toothcomb, making it the earliest fossil primate to indisputably bear this trait, which is unique to all living strepsirrhines (lemurs, lorises, and galagos).

In 2010 a second species, K. arenula, was described in the journal Nature from Late Middle Eocene rocks in Libya.

== Palaeobiology ==
=== Diet ===
Dental topographic analysis suggests that K. clarki was insectivorous, although it indicates uncertainty as to whether or not it also consumed plant exudates such as sap or gum. Comparison of the relative molar proportions of K. clarki to those of extant exudativores suggests that K. clarki was not an exudativore because it is unlike them in regard to this phenotypic trait. Fossils of K. clarki suffering from dental caries have been described, suggesting a sweet diet.
