= Philip D. Gingerich =

American paleontologist

- Born: Philip Dean Gingerich; March 23, 1946 (age 80); Iowa, U.S.
- Education: Princeton University (A.B.); Yale University (M.Phil., Ph.D.)
- Occupations: Paleontologist, geologist, biologist, anthropologist
- Known for: Leading expert on the evolution of primates and whales
- Website: Official website

Philip Dean Gingerich (born March 23, 1946) is an American paleontologist and educator. He is a professor emeritus of geology, biology, and anthropology at the University of Michigan, Ann Arbor, and directed the Museum of Paleontology at the University of Michigan (UMMP) from 1981 to 2010. His research focus is on vertebrate paleontology, especially the Paleocene–Eocene transition and early Cenozoic mammals. His primary research focus is on the origin of modern orders of mammals, and he is a leading expert on the evolution of primates and Whales. Gingerich was among the experts who analyzed the skeleton of Darwinius masillae.

== Early life ==
Gingerich grew up in a family of Amish Mennonites in eastern Iowa, where his grandfather was a farmer and a lay preacher. Yet, Gingerich felt no contradiction between religion and science: "My grandfather had an open mind about the age of the Earth," he says, "and never mentioned evolution. Remember, these were people of great humility, who only expressed an opinion on something when they knew a lot about it."

== Education and awards ==
Gingerich received an A.B. from Princeton University in 1968, a M.Phil. from Yale University in 1972, and a Ph.D., also from Yale, in 1974. All of his university degrees were in the field of geology.

Gingerich was awarded the Henry Russel Award from the University of Michigan in 1980, the Shadle Fellowship Award from the American Society of Mammalogists in 1973, and the Charles Schuchert Award from the Paleontological Society in 1981. He was elected to the American Academy of Arts and Sciences in 2001 and the American Philosophical Society in 2010 and was president of the Paleontological Society 2010–2012. He was awarded the Romer-Simpson Medal by the Society of Vertebrate Paleontology in 2012.

== Research ==
- Rates of evolution
- Paleocene-Eocene Thermal Maximum
- Origin and early evolution of whales (Cetacea)
- Origin and early evolution of primates
