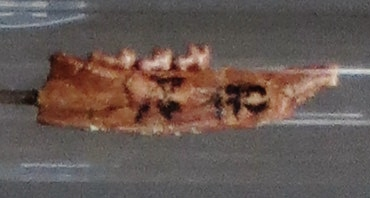
- The mandible of Donrussellia provincialis

Scientific classification
- Domain: Eukaryota
- Kingdom: Animalia
- Phylum: Chordata
- Class: Mammalia
- Order: Primates
- Suborder: Strepsirrhini
- Family: †Notharctidae
- Subfamily: †Cercamoniinae
- Genus: †Donrussellia; Szalay, 1976

Type species
- †Donrussellia gallica Russell et al, 1967

Species
- D. gallica; D. louisi; D. magna; D. provincialis; D. russelli

= Donrussellia =

Donrussellia Temporal range: Early Eocene

Extinct genus of primates

Donrussellia is a genus of adapiform primate that lived in Europe during the early Eocene. It is considered one of the earliest adapiforms, with D. magna sharing features with Cantius.
