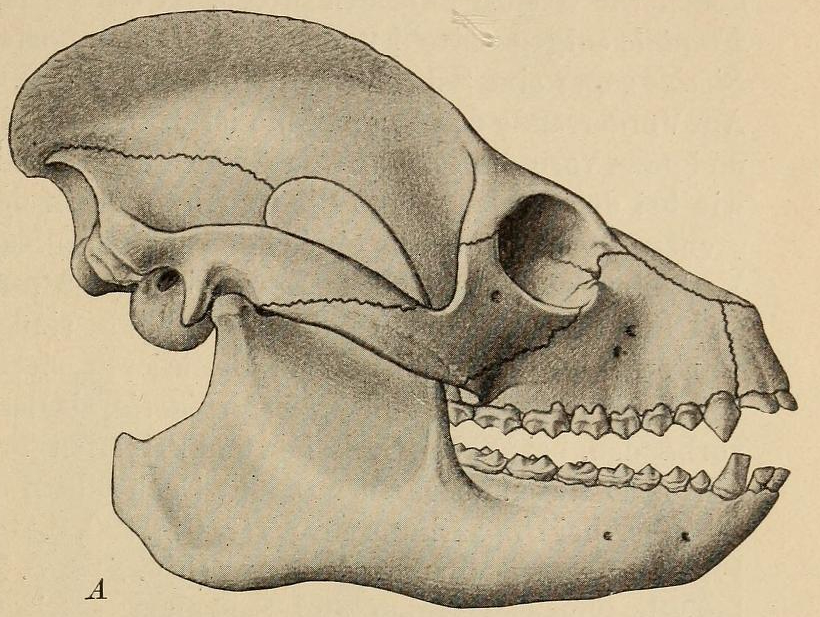
- Adapis parisiensis
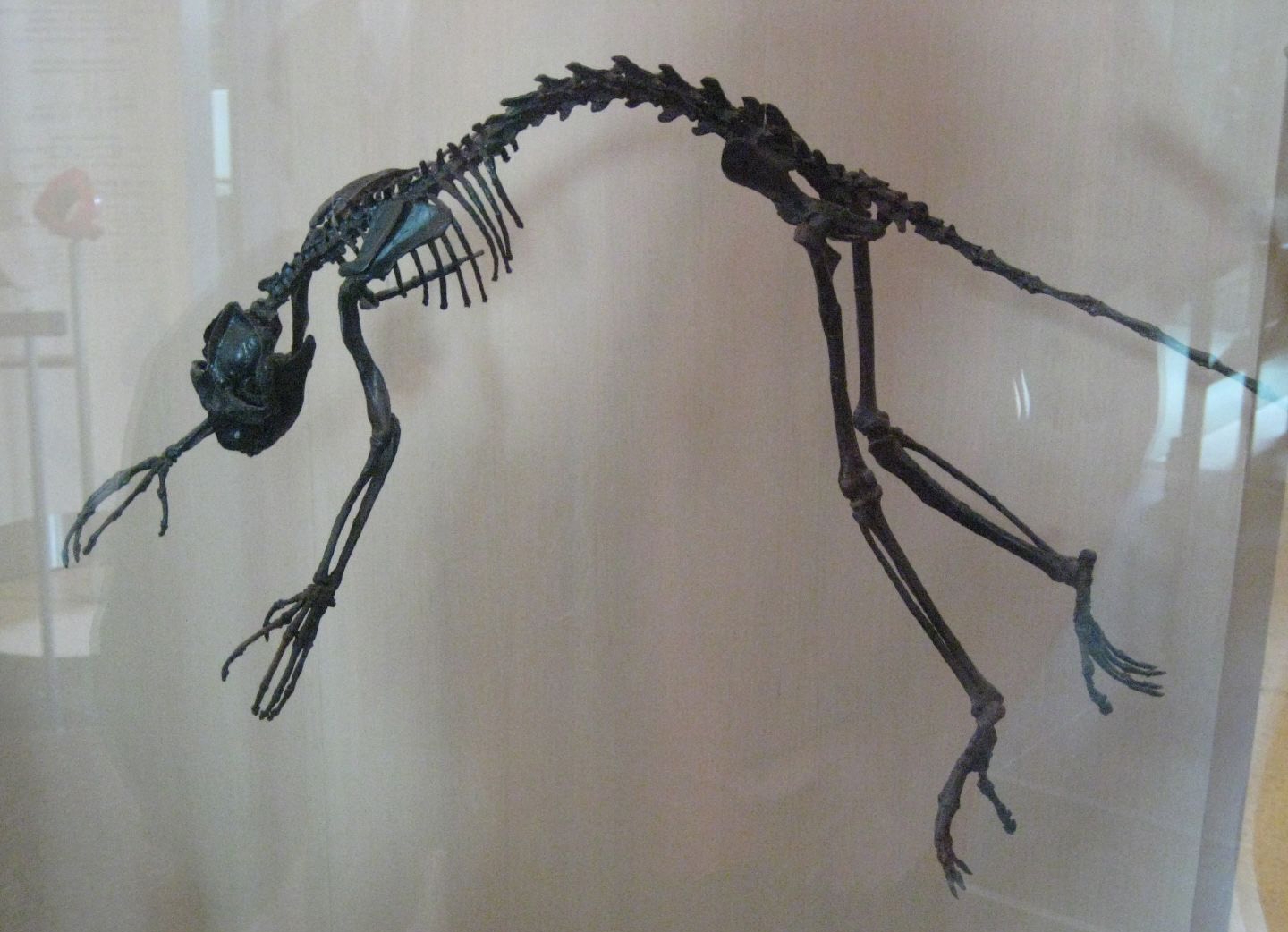
- Notharctus tenebrosus

Scientific classification
- Kingdom: Animalia
- Phylum: Chordata
- Class: Mammalia
- Infraclass: Placentalia
- Order: Primates
- Suborder: Strepsirrhini
- Infraorder: †Adapiformes; Hoffstetter, 1977
- Superfamily: †Adapoidea; Trouessart, 1879

Families
- †Notharctidae; †Sivaladapidae; †Asiadapinae; †Adapidae; †Ekgmowechashalidae

= Adapiformes =

Adapiformes Temporal range: 56.0–11.1 Ma Eocene – Late Miocene

Extinct order of primates

Adapiformes is a group of early primates. Adapiforms radiated throughout much of the northern continental mass (now Europe, Asia and North America), reaching as far south as northern Africa and tropical Asia. They existed from the Eocene to the Miocene epoch. Some adapiforms resembled living lemurs.

Adapiforms are known from the fossil record only, and it is unclear whether they form a monophyletic or paraphyletic group. When assumed to be a clade, they are usually grouped under the "wet-nosed" taxon Strepsirrhini, which would make them more closely related to the lemurs and less so to the "dry-nosed" Haplorhini taxon that includes monkeys and apes.

In 2009, Franzen and colleagues placed the newly described genus Darwinius in the "Adapoidea group of early primates representative of early haplorhine diversification" so that, according to these authors, the adapiforms would not be within the Strepsirrhini lineage as hitherto assumed but qualify as a stem "missing link" between Strepsirrhini and Haplorrhini. However, subsequent analysis on the Darwinius fossil by Erik Seiffert and colleagues rejects this "missing link" idea, classifying Darwinius and other adapiforms within the Strepsirrhini.

Boyer et al. found that the crown Strepsirrhini likely emerged deep in the Adapiformes tree, possibly as sister of a group which include e.g. Aframonius and Notharctidae. The Adapiformes are thus found not to be literally extinct (in the sense of having no living descendants), and becomes a junior synonym to the Strepsirrhini. Below is a simplified cladogram.

- Primates
  - Haplorrhini
  - Strepsirrhini/ Adapiformes
    - Donrussellia provincialis
    - - grade of extinct adapiform taxa
      - Crown Strepsirrhini

A 2018 study puts Donrussellia as sister to crown primates.

== Classification ==
Adapiforms belong to the infraorder Adapiformes, which contains a single superfamily, Adapoidea. The group also is sometimes treated as a superfamily (Adapoidea) alongside the other living strepsirrhine superfamilies, Lemuroidea (lemurs) and Lorisoidea (lorises and galagos).

- Infraorder Adapiformes
  - Superfamily Adapoidea
    - Family Notharctidae
    - Family Sivaladapidae
    - Family Adapidae
- Infraorder incertae sedis
  - Superfamily incertae sedis
    - Family Azibiidae
    - Family Djebelemuridae

Rose (1995) suggests that early adapiforms and omomyiforms shared a common ancestor dating to the Thanetian age.

== Sources ==
- Rose, K.D. (2009). The Beginning of the Age of Mammals. Johns Hopkins University Press. ISBN 978-0-801-89221-9. OCLC 646769601.
- Fleagle, J.G. (2013). Primate Adaptation and Evolution (3rd ed.). Academic Press. ISBN 978-0-123-78633-3. OCLC 820107187.
