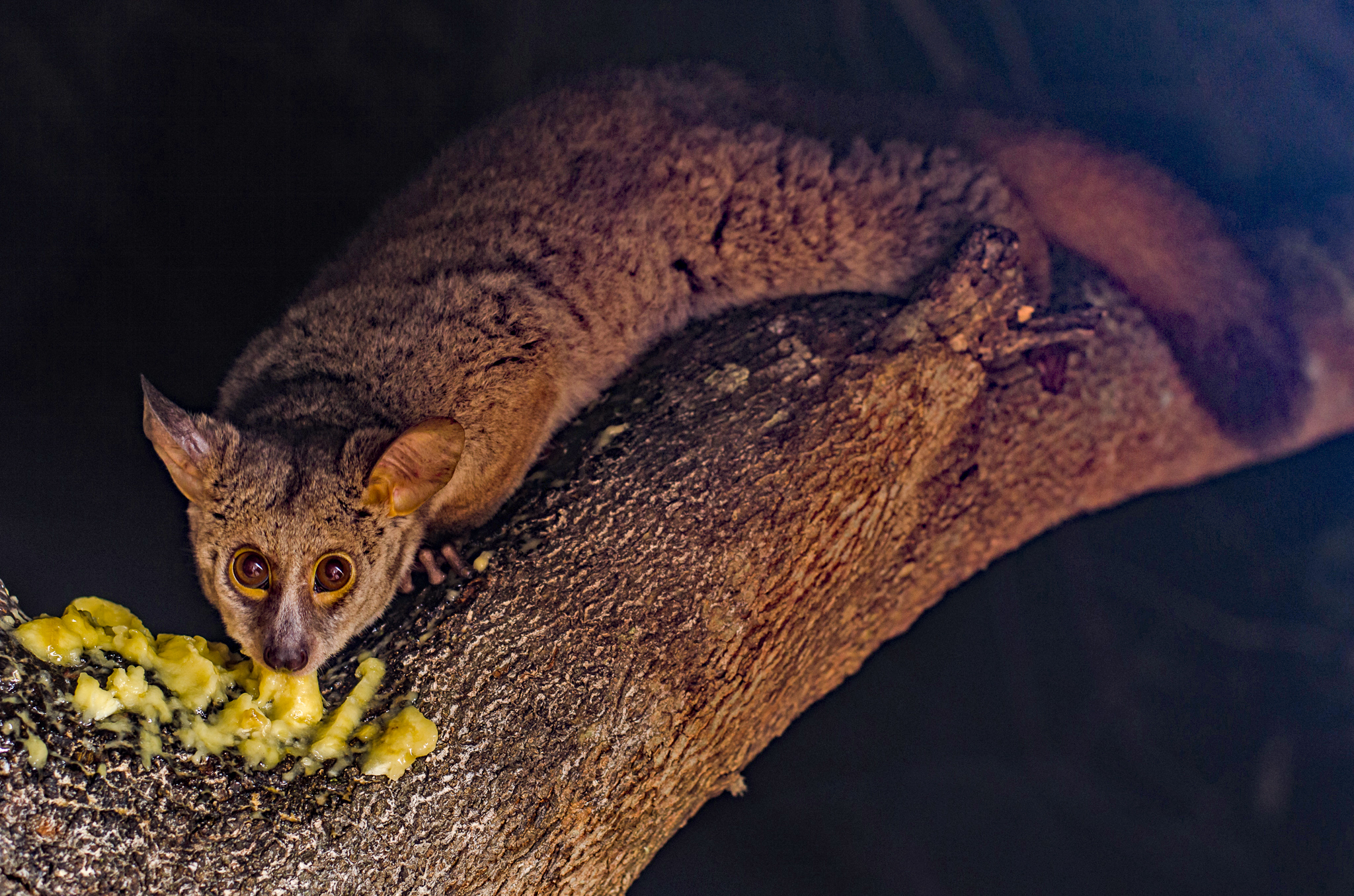
- Brown greater galago, Otolemur crassicaudatus

Scientific classification
- Kingdom: Animalia
- Phylum: Chordata
- Class: Mammalia
- Infraclass: Placentalia
- Order: Primates
- Suborder: Strepsirrhini
- Infraorder: Lemuriformes (Note: The monophyletic clade containing the lemurs and lorisoids is widely accepted, but the name to be used for the clade is not yet agreed upon. The term Lemuriformes is used here since it derives from one popular taxonomy that clumps the clade of toothcombed primates into one infraorder and the extinct, non-toothcombed adapiforms into another, both within the suborder Strepsirrhini. However, a popular alternative taxonomy places the lorisoids in their own infraorder, Lorisiformes.)
- Superfamily: Lorisoidea; Gray 1821

Families
- Galagidae Lorisidae

= Lorisoidea =

Lorisiformes Temporal range: Eocene–present

Superfamily of primates

Lorisoidea is a superfamily of nocturnal primates found throughout Africa and Asia. Members include the galagos and the lorisids. As strepsirrhines, lorisoids are related to the lemurs of Madagascar and are sometimes included in the infraorder Lemuriformes, although they are also sometimes placed in their own infraorder, Lorisiformes Gregory, 1915.

== Classification ==
- Order Primates
  - Suborder Strepsirrhini
    - Infraorder †Adapiformes
    - Infraorder Lemuriformes
      - Superfamily Lemuroidea: lemurs
      - Superfamily Lorisoidea
        - Family Lorisidae: lorises, pottos, and angwantibos
        - Family Galagidae: galagos
  - Suborder Haplorhini: tarsiers, monkeys, and apes

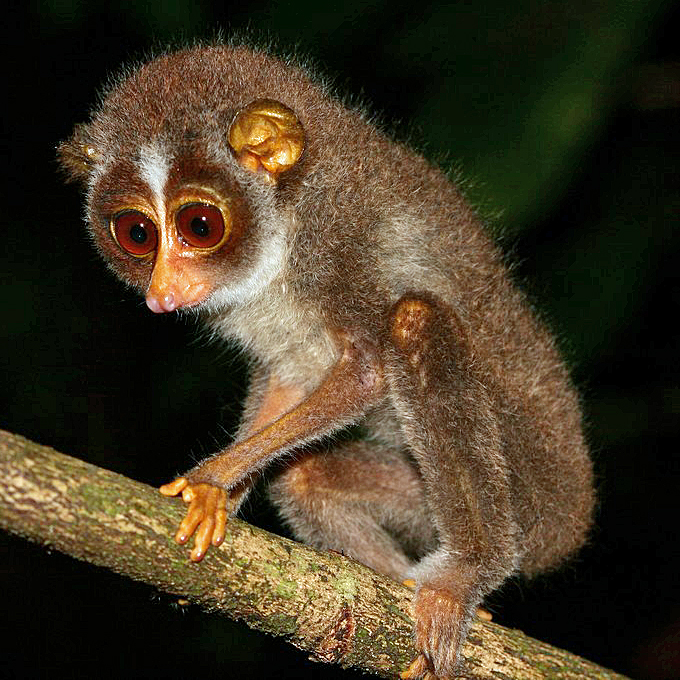
Red slender loris, Loris tardigradus
