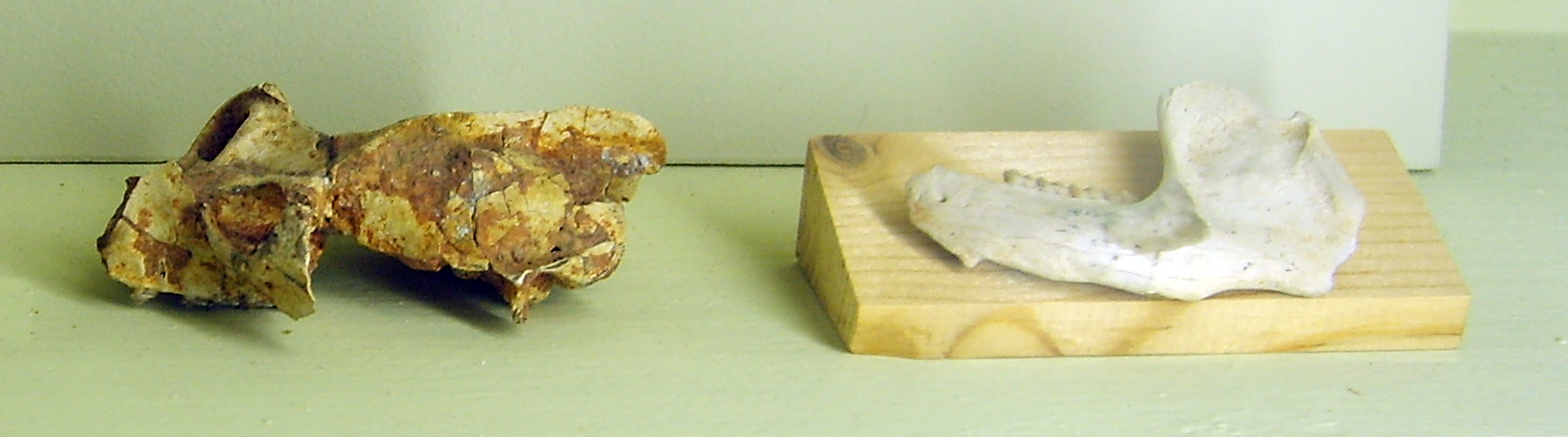
- Adapis parisiensis skull remains, Natural History Museum, Berlin

Scientific classification
- Kingdom: Animalia
- Phylum: Chordata
- Class: Mammalia
- Order: Primates
- Suborder: Strepsirrhini
- Family: †Adapidae
- Subfamily: †Adapinae
- Genus: †Adapis; Cuvier, 1822

Type species
- †Adapis parisiensis Cuvier, 1824

Other species
- †A. laharpi Pictet and Humbert, 1869; †A. bruni Stehlin, 1912; †A. schlosseri Stehlin, 1912; †A. stintoni Gingerich, 1977; †A. sudrei Gingerich, 1977

Synonyms
- Genus synonymy: Aphelotherium Blainville, 1848–1852; Synonyms of A. parisiensis: Adapis cuvieri Fischer, 1829; Aphelotherium Duvernoyi Blainville, 1848–1852; Adapis parisiensis var. crassa Filhol, 1883; Synonyms of A. laharpi: Lophiotherium Laharpi Rütimeyer, 1869; Dubious species: Aphelotherium Rouxi Noulet, 1863

= Adapis =

Adapis Temporal range: Middle Eocene – Late Eocene, 40–34 Ma

Extinct genus of primates

Adapis is the type genus of the Adapidae, an extinct family of primates from the Palaeogene within the extinct infraorder Adapiformes. It was endemic to western Europe and lived from the Middle to Late Eocene. Adapis was first named in 1822 by the French palaeontologist Georges Cuvier, who studied incomplete jaws from Montmartre and thought it to have been a "pachyderm" similar to the artiodactyl Anoplotherium. Adapis parisiensis was recognized by Cuvier in 1824; several other species of Adapis were named in the late 19th and 20th centuries. In the 1870s, Adapis was recognized formally as a primate rather than a "pachyderm", with later researchers noting that Adapis was therefore the first fossil primate to have ever been taxonomically described. Palaeolemur and Leptadapis of the subfamily Adapinae, an endemic European primate subfamily, were previously reclassified as synonyms or subgenera of Adapis but were eventually recognized again as distinct genera from Adapis. As a result, there are six total species of Adapis, with A. parisiensis being the type species.

Adapis was a medium-sized adapid with weight estimates approximately ranging from 1 kg (2.2 lb) to 4 kg (8.8 lb) and notably has varying degrees of shared anatomical traits with the clade Lemuriformes (lemurs and lorisoids), which is generally classified into the suborder Strepsirrhini along with Adapiformes. Adapis differs from lemuriformes due to a more prominent facial skeleton, high sagittal crests, large zygomatic arches, robust mandibles, and relatively small orbits among various other traits. In contrast to its close relative Leptadapis, Adapis has smaller orbits with stronger degrees of frontation and orbital convergence; the degrees of frontation and orbital convergence are not as well-pronounced as in Palaeolemur. In terms of dentition, Adapis has reduced and incisor-like canine teeth and premolars that progressively increase in size and become molarized from the front to back premolars of the dental row. Its dental morphology could have allowed for a primarily folivorous (leaf-eating) diet with probably some degree of fruit-eating, although it does not show a large degree of specializations. Adapis also has postcranial similarities to contemporaneous adapiforms and extant strepsirrhines such as the degree of limb robustness but lacks close analogues. It had the shortest hand of all Eocene-aged adapiforms with small digits but longer metacarpal bones. Like in other adapids, its forelimbs and hindlimbs were about as equally long; its hand posture allows for the body to be parallel to the ground when walking. Typical of strepsirrhines, it was an arboreal quaduped; hypotheses of the locomotion of Adapis range from slow climber to a walker-runner, with some researchers expressing with uncertainty that different species could have had different forms of arboreal locomotion.

The unambiguous fossil range of adapines like Adapis is limited to the Middle to Late Eocene of western Europe, coinciding with geographical separation of the landmass from others as an archipelago. This was in contrast to the other adapid subfamily Caenopithecinae, which was also present in Africa and Asia but only had one genus present in Europe. Adapis coexisted with both other primates, namely fellow adapids and omomyids of the subfamily Microchoerinae. Climates in western Europe were tropical to subtropical up to the Late Eocene, although the end of the Middle Eocene had significant climactic and faunal shifts.

== Taxonomy ==
=== Research history ===
==== 19th century taxonomy ====
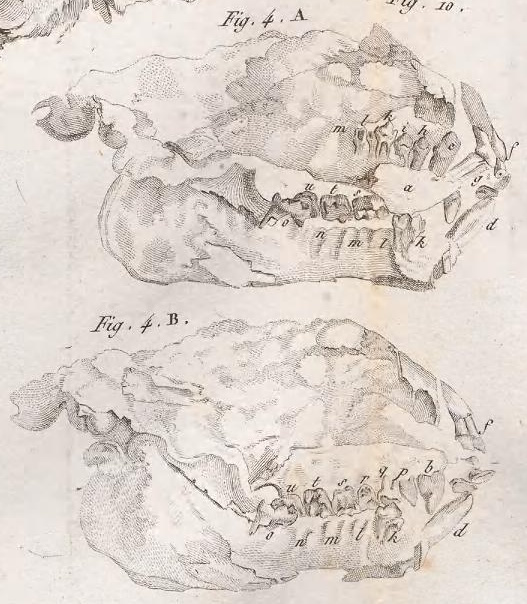
1822 illustrations of the jaws of Adapis parisiensis, Montmartre

In 1812, French palaeontologist Georges Cuvier provided the first illustration and description of fossils of what he in later years assigned to Adapis. In 1822, Cuvier wrote about what he thought to have been a pachyderm based on fossilized jaws (upper and lower) from the gypsum quarries of Montmartre, assigning them to the provisional genus name Adapis. He described the skull as being roughly similar to that of a hedgehog but a third larger. He observed that the jaw had four incisors (two top and bottom each) that were sharp and slightly oblique like those of Anoplotherium, conical canine teeth, and seven upper molars that he also noted to be somewhat similar to those of Anoplotherium. Cuvier also said that the name Adapis had before been applied to hyraxes and was first used in a 1551 work by Swiss naturalist Conrad Gesner as a genus name for hares. Adapis means "no carpet" and is a compound of the Ancient Greek words α- (a, 'not') and δάπις (dápis, 'carpet'). The genus name may have been based on the idea that the taxon, then thought to have been a pachyderm, may have had rough or thorny skin. Because of its early taxonomic history, Adapis was the first fossil primate to have ever been taxonomically described.

In a later source volume dated at 1824, Cuvier created the name Adapis parisiensis for the species from Montmartre that he previously described. In 1829, German naturalist Johann Baptist Fischer listed Adapis as a valid species, creating the species name A. cuvieri in reference to the fossil material previously written about by Cuvier. The French naturalist Henri Marie Ducrotay de Blainville in an 1839–1864 osteography and French palaeontologist Paul Gervais in 1848 both treated A. parisiensis as the valid species name.

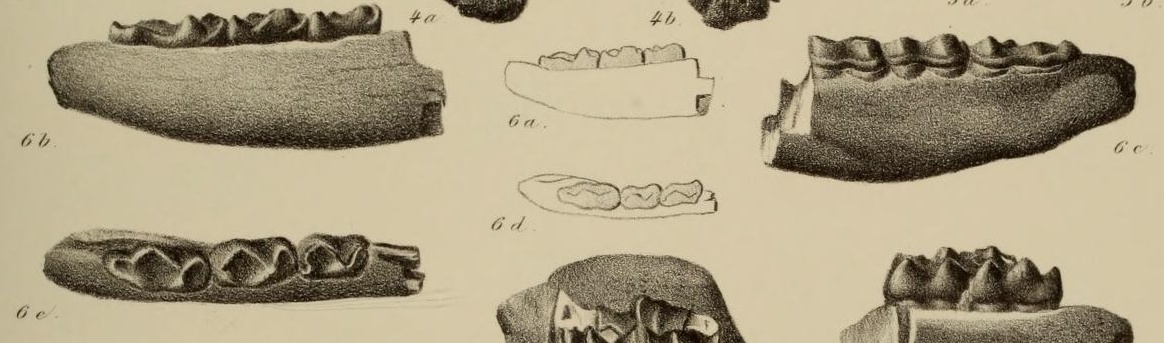
1869 illustration of the jaw of A. laharpi (fig. 6, different sides)

In an 1848–1852 osteography, Gervais erected the genus and species name Aphelotherium Duvernoyi based on a jaw with three molars from the limestone deposits of Barthelemy at the hill of Perreal in the French commune of Apt. In 1863, the French naturalist Jean-Baptiste Noulet wrote about a lower jaw with four molars from a locality called Sagnes in a fossil collection from Castres, assigning it to the erected name Aphelotherium Rouxi. Noulet stated that the fossil, which was initially studied by his late friend and colleague Léonce Roux as belonging to Mustela, was described by him as being half the size of A. Duvernoyi and barely larger than the jaw of a squirrel. In 1869, Swiss palaeontologists François Jules Pictet de la Rive and Aloïs Humbert wrote about a fossil collection of Swiss physician Philippe de La Harpe, in particular a small jaw that was studied by Swiss palaeontologist Ludwig Rütimeyer; Rütimeyer designated to the fossil the species name Lophiotherium Laharpi. Pictet suggested that the species name be retained in his article going forward.

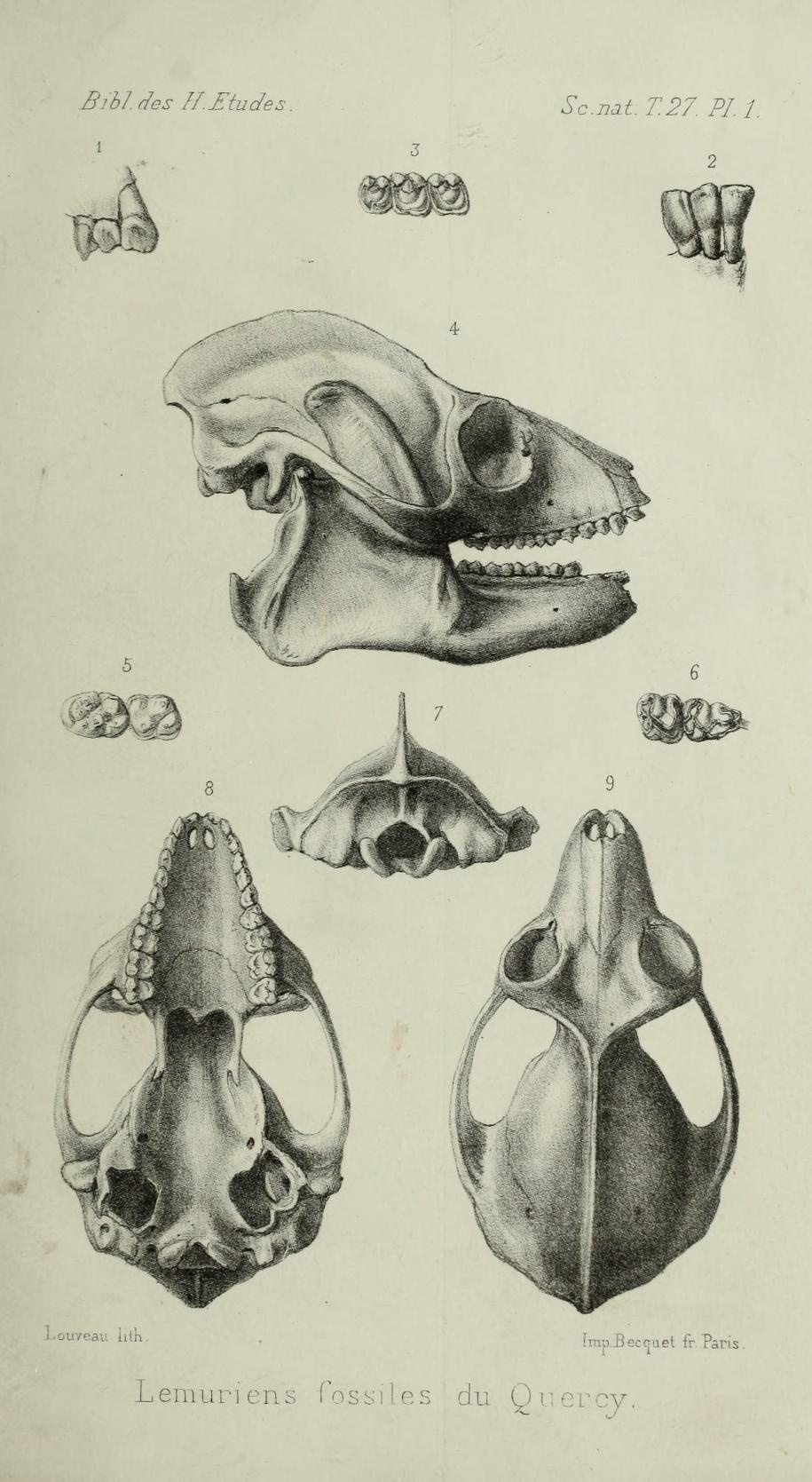
1883 Illustrations of cranial and dental fossils of adapiformes from Quercy deposits, among them the dentitions (fig. 1-2) and skull (fig. 4, 7-9) of A. parisiensis

In 1873, French palaeontologist Eugene Edmond Delfortrie wrote about a nearly complete fossil skull unearthed by Mr. Bétille from the calcium phosphates at his property of Sainte-Néboule de Bédour at the department of Lot. Delfortrie considered the fossil to be one that could help to fill the fossil gap for lemurs for the first time ever, considering the skull to have belonged to a lemur and therefore a primate. In light of the primate skull, he erected the genus Palæolemur, also establishing the species name Palæolemur Betillei. The same year, Gervais argued that Palaeolemur (also spelled by him as "Paléolémur") was not closely related to the lemurs of Madagascar because of the different dental formulas and the differences in the shapes of the teeth. He noted his and French palaeontologist Jean Albert Gaudry's observations that Palaeolemur and Aphelotherium were not well-distinguished from each other and Adapis to the point where the former two genera and their species should be synonymized with the latter genus and its species. He had additionally wrote about Adapis and Aphelotherium previously having been thought to have been pachyderms grouped in with Anoplotherium whereas Palaeolemur was grouped in with the lemurs based on a complete skull. He also mentioned that Caenopithecus lemuroides should probably also be reassigned to Adapis.

In 1874, French palaeontologist Henri Filhol reviewed the anatomy of Palaeolemur, describing its skull as being similar to those of lemurs but with key differences like a high sagittal crest that do not demonstrate as close of an affinity with them as previously thought. The reported species had multiple known jaws including that long held by Filhol himself, who long thought that it belonged to a pachyderm related to Anoplotherium and resembled that of Adapis. Filhol elaborated that it was only because of more complete skull evidence rather than dental evidence alone that he considered it to be a primate and not a pachyderm. He then hypothesized that the primate taxon would have belonged to the "Pachylemur" group but also agreed with the synonymization of both Palaeolemur and Aphelotherium with Adapis on the basis of similar dentitions and the latter genus name being the oldest. Using another skull from the commune of Saint-Antonin-Noble-Val, he named another species A. magnus. In 1876, Gervais erected the genus Leptadapis, where the species A. magnus was reclassified to.

In 1877, Filhol erected A. minor, having observed that remains assigned to it had been found in various deposits with A. parisiensis. He expressed being unsure of whether A. minor was a descendant of A. parisiensis and/or a distinct species. In 1878, Gaudry supported the synonymization of Aphelotherium with Adapis along with affinities of the latter with lemurs, albeit with significant anatomical differences like a more developed sagittal crest and smaller eye sockets. However, he supported the validity of Adapis duvernoyi, viewing it as distinct from A. parisiensis. He also expressed being unsure as to whether or not "A." magnus was a distinct species from A. parisiensis. In 1883, Filhol documented complete skulls and postcranial fossils (limb bones like the humeri and femora) of A. parisiensis and additional dental and postcranial material he determined belonged to A. magnus, all of which came from fossil collections from Quercy. The palaeontologist created the taxon A. parisiensis var. angustidens (or A. angustidens) using a lower jaw. Filhol recognized multiple other new variations of A. parisiensis, namely A. parisiensis var. crassa, A. parisiensis var. curvirostris, A. parisiensis var. mutans, and A. parisiensis var. mutata. He also listed Caenopithecus as a distinct genus from Adapis. In 1885, British palaeontologist Richard Lydekker reaffirmed the synonymizations of Aphelotherium duvernoyi (or "Adapis duvernoyi") and Palæolemur betillei with Adapis parisiensis. In 1888, Filhol communicated about a partial lower jaw with several premolars and molars that was provided to him by Mr. Rossignol. The fossil in question came from the phosphate deposits of Quercy and was assigned by him to the newly named A. angustidens.

==== 20th- and 21st-century taxonomy ====
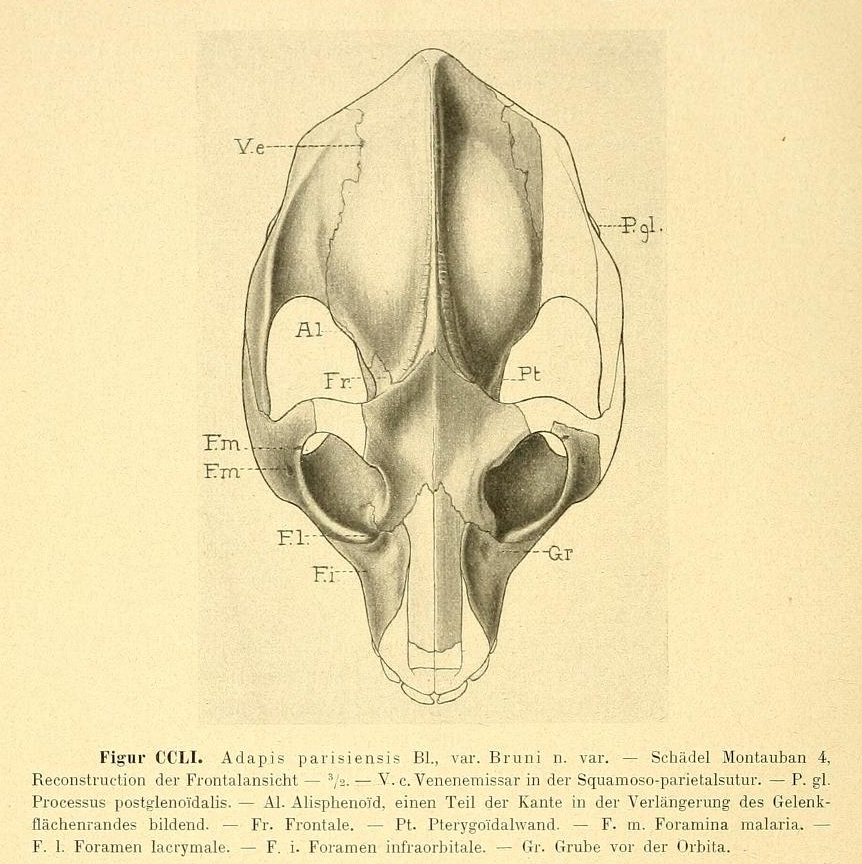
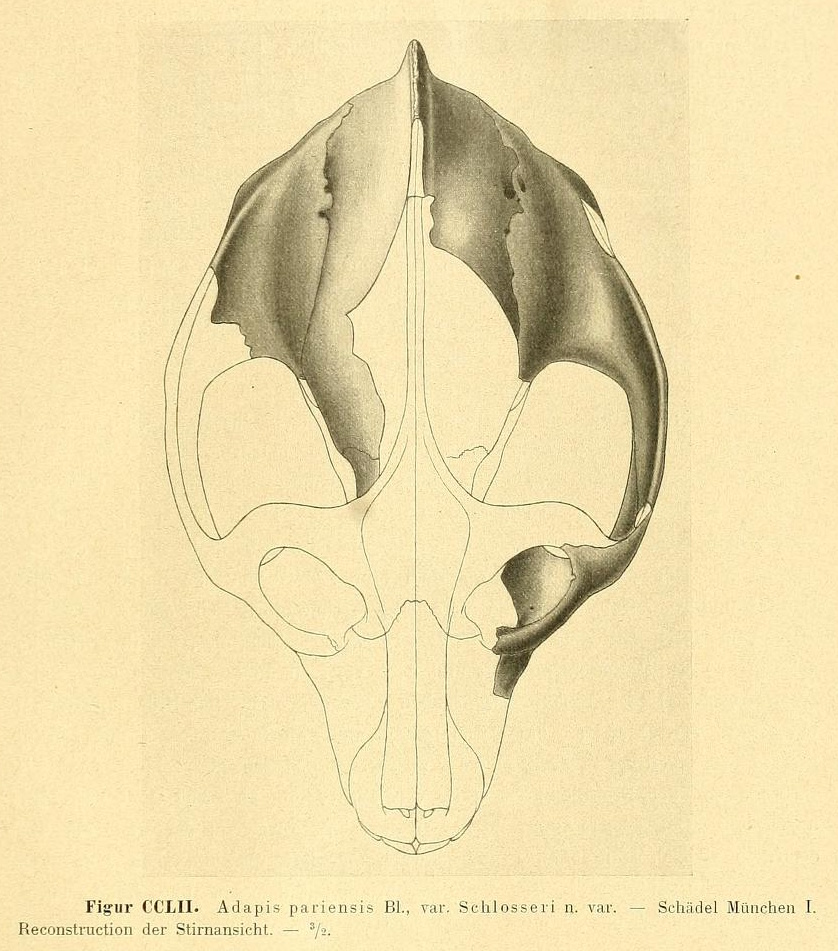
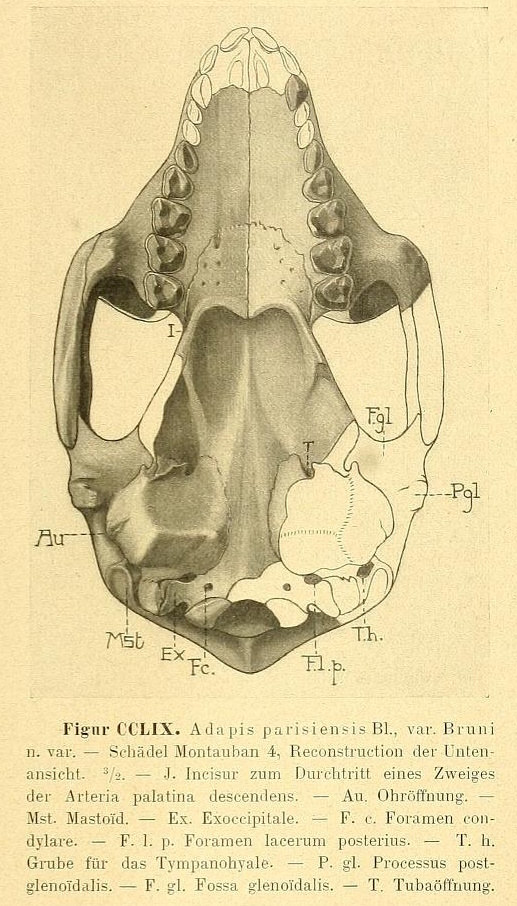
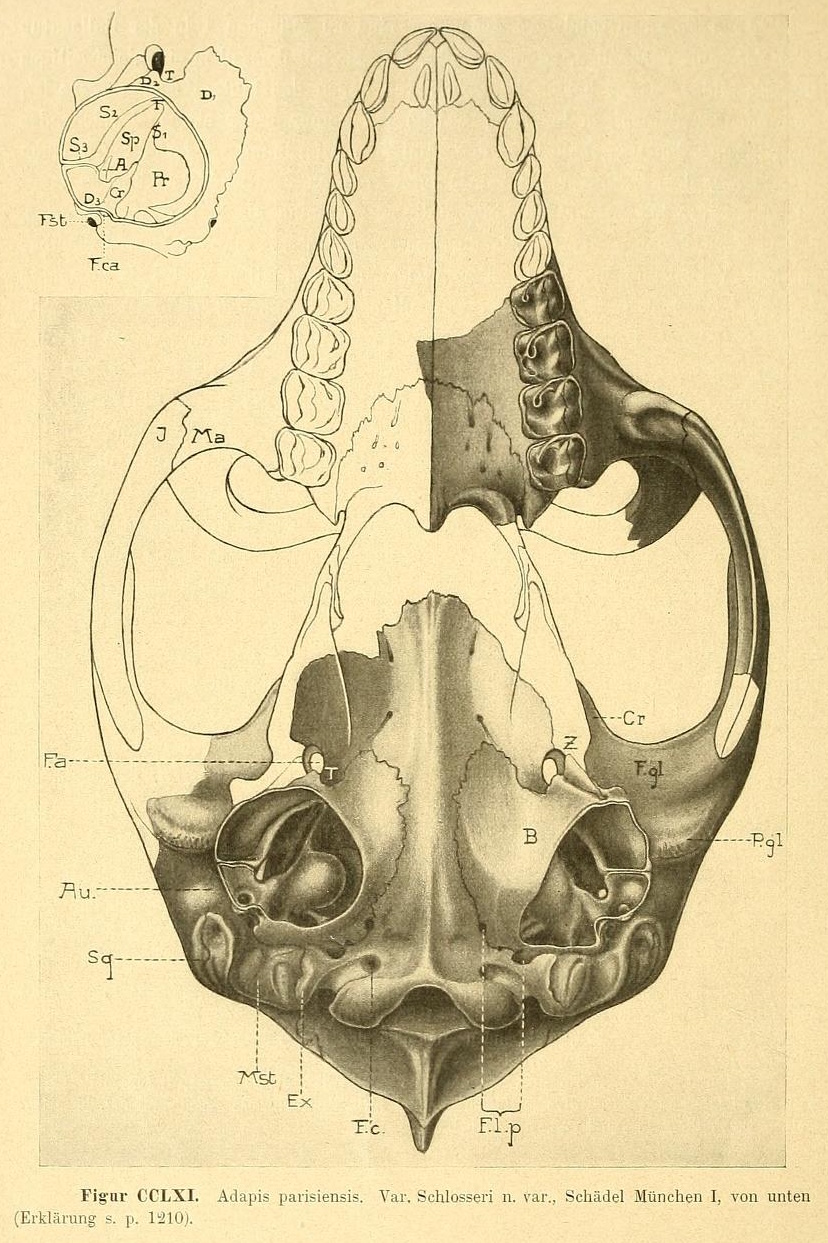
1912 illustrations of the reconstructed skulls of A. bruni (left) and A. schlosseri (right) from the upper (top) and lower (bottom) perspectives

In 1912, Swiss palaeontologist Hans Georg Stehlin wrote an extensive review on Adapis, recognizing multiple taxa within the genus and reviewing others. He supported the synonymizations of Aphelotherium and Palaeolemur with Adapis and Aphelotherium duvernoyi with Adapis parisiensis and reclassified Leptadapis as a subgenus of the latter. In his review, he recognized three variations of A. parisiensis: A. parisiensis var. Schlosseri using some skull material from Munich and Montauban, A. parisiensis var. Bruni using a skull from Montauban, and A. magnus var. leenhardti from Montauban. He erected A. (Leptadapis) Rütimeyeri based on cranial material from Egerkingen that were previously classified under A. duvernoyi in 1888 and A. parisiensis in 1891 by Swiss palaeontologist Ludwig Rütimeyer. Stehlin questioned whether "Aphelotherium" rouxi truly was a reflection of the now-synonymized genus it was described under but was also hesitant on assigning it to Adapis. He was unable to locate the fossil of the species however, considering it to be lost material. He also suggested that A. parisiensis var. mutata was almost identical to A. parisiensis var. mutans and that A. minor could be synonymized with A. parisiensis angustidens. In 1916, Stehlin erected additional Adapis species from Egerkingen, the first being A. priscus based on a mandible and the second being A. sciureus from a molar and mandibular fragments. In 1930, German palaeontologist Florian Heller erected Adapis (Leptadapis) minimus (considering Leptadapis a subgenus of Adapis), basing it off of a partial left maxilla with dentition from the German fossil deposit of Geiseltal.

In 1962, American palaeontologist Elwyn L. Simons considered the holotype specimen of A. minimus to be an indeterminate specimen due to its tooth enamel having been removed by chemical solutions and therefore invalidated the species. He listed A. parisiensis, A. magnus, A. rutimeyeri, A. priscus, and A. sciureus as valid species of Adapis and synonymized Leptadapis with it. In 1971, German palaeontologist Norbert Schmidt-Kittler erected A. ulmensis based on lower dentition from the German locality of Ehrenstein near Ulm, having named it after the city. In 1973, author Peter Edgar Clay follows Simons' classification of Adapis species and also recognized A. parisiensis as the type species. Later in 1974, American palaeontologist Frederick S. Szalay reclassified A. sciureus into its own genus Microadapis and, in another work with fellow American palaeontologist Richard Lee Decker dating to the same year, treated Leptadapis as a distinct genus from Adapis for which A. magnus, A. priscus, and A. ruetimeyeri were to be reclassified to and considered Adapis to have only a single species A. parisiensis.

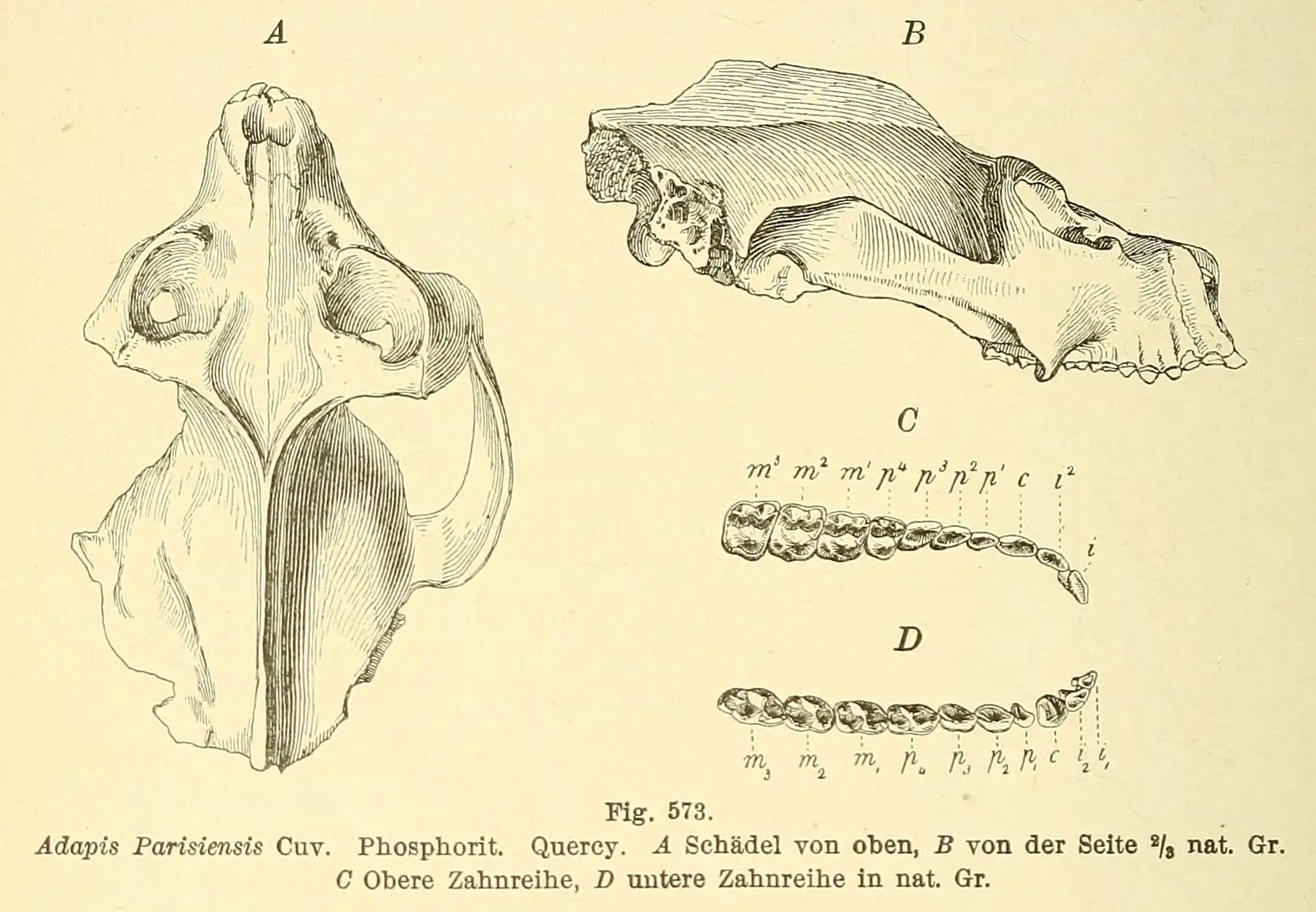
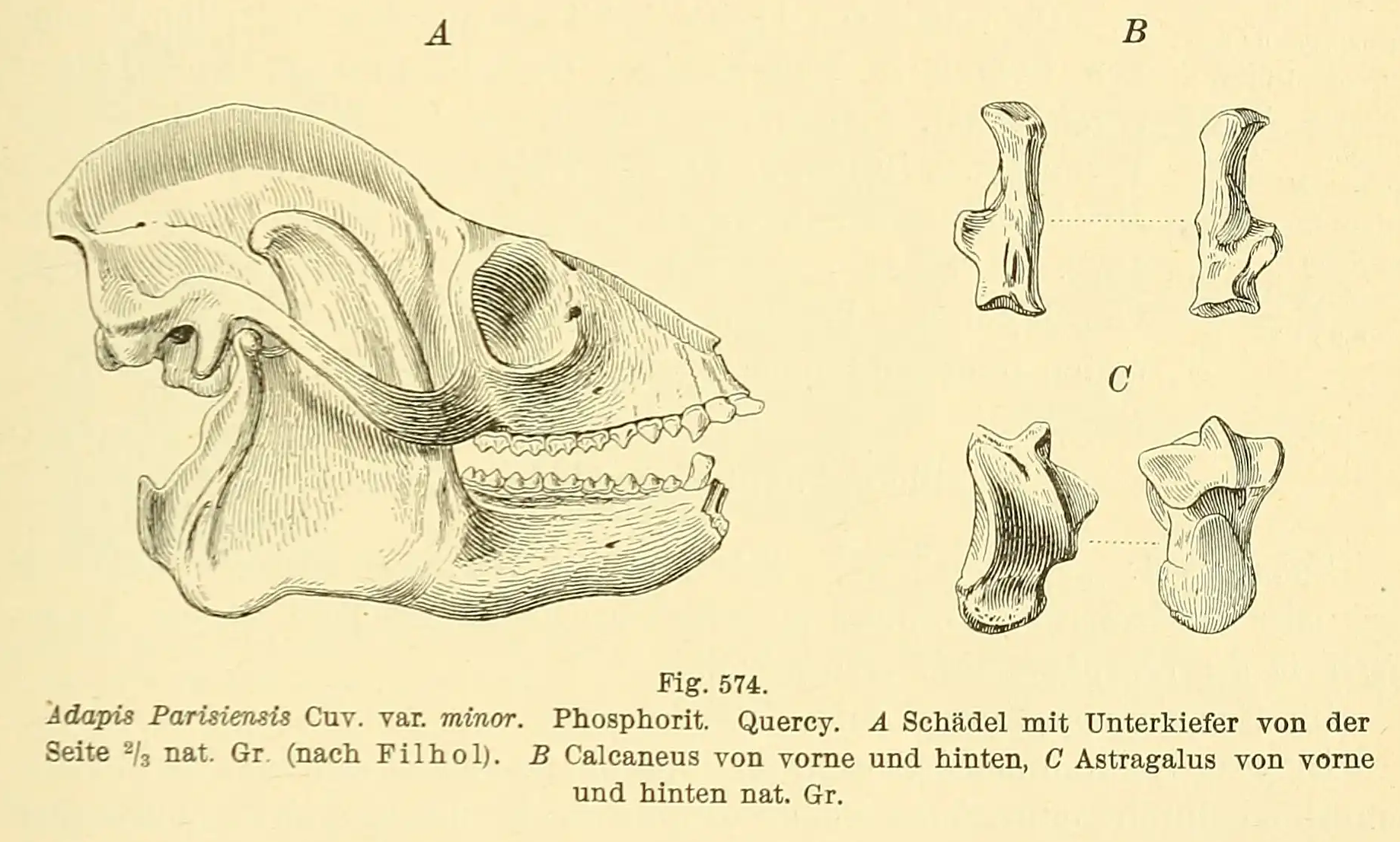
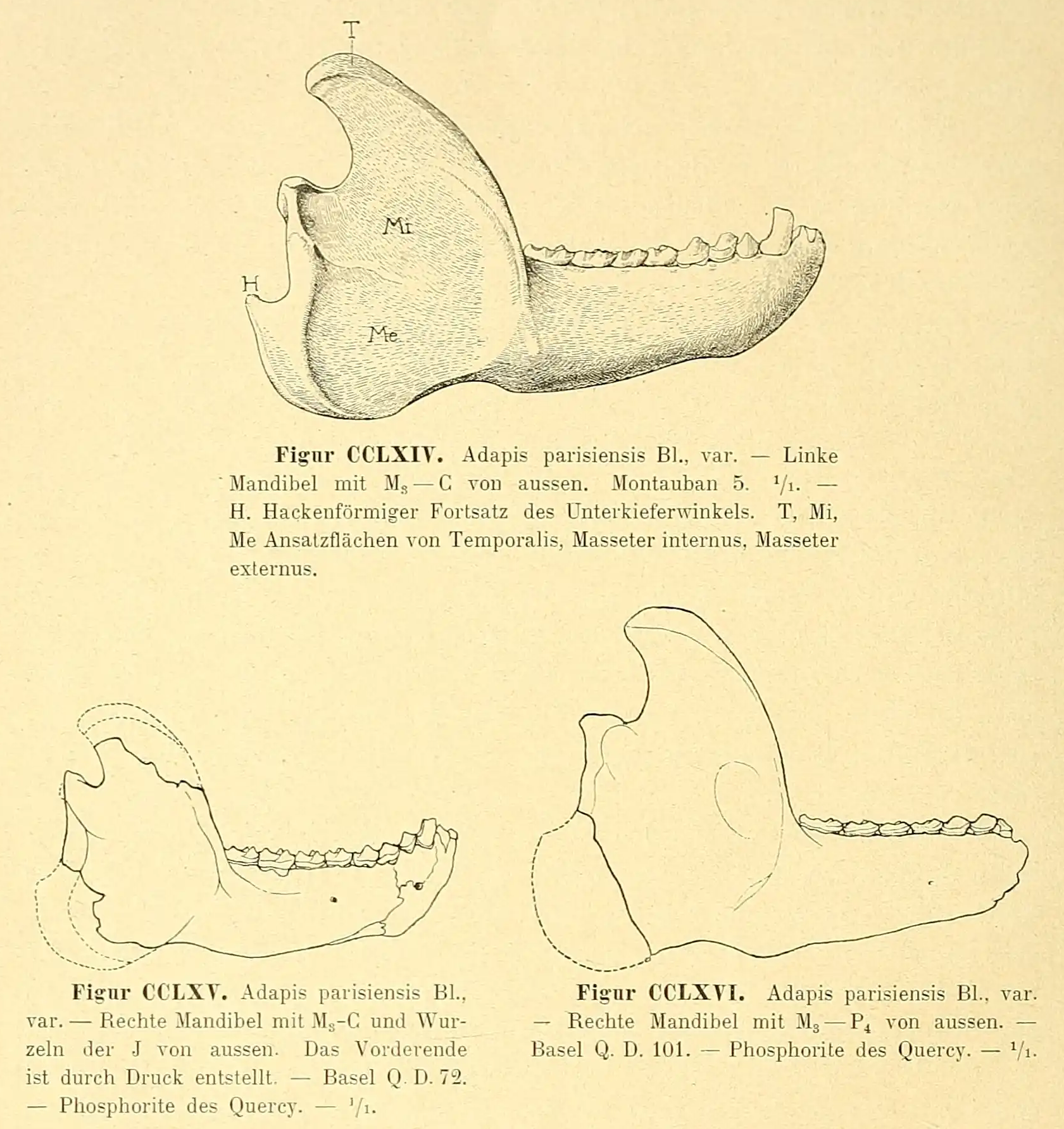
1891–1893 illustrations of A. parisiensis skull, dental, and tarsal bone fossils from Quercy (left and center) and 1912 illustrations of the mandibles of A. spp. (right)

In 1977, Schmidt-Kittler reclassified "A." ulmensis to Protoadapis. The same year, American palaeontologist Philip D. Gingerich made an extensive review on the Adapidae including Adapis itself. He listed "Protoadapis" ulmensis with quotations, questioning the genus-level placement of the species, and listed A. laharpei as an Adapis species. He also questioned the validities of several adapiform genera like Microadapis and Leptadapis, going far as to argue that the latter should not even be used as an Adapis subgenus. The first species of Adapis that he newly named was A. sudrei, which was based on a left maxilla with dentition uncovered from Robiac and named in honor of French palaeontologist Jean Sudre due to his contributions to the field of Eocene primates. The second species he erected was A. stintoni, whose holotype specimens are mandibles and isolated teeth of a single individual from the Headon Hill Formation of the Isle of Wight. It was named after British palaeontologist Fred C. Stinton, who collected the described fossils. Gingerich also suggested that A. crassa was probably a synonym of A. parisiensis and that A. mutans was a synonym of A. betillei. Additionally, he considered A. angustidens (for which A. parisiensis angustidens of 1883 was to be synonymized with) to be a valid species while erecting the name Protoadapis filholi to replace P. angustidens (which A. angustidens as named in 1888 was to be synonymized with). In 1979, Szalay and American palaeontologist Eric Delson considered A. laharpi, A. betillei, A. sudrei, and A. stintoni as synonyms of A. parisiensis and revalidated both Microadapis and Leptadapis, also confirming the genus-level placements of M. sciureus, L. magnus, and L. priscus. However, the authors mentioned that a more detailed study on the various specimens classified to Adapis could result in the recognition of species other than A. parisiensis.

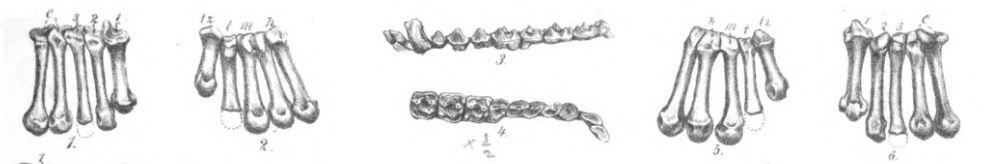
1887 illustrations of the metacarpal (fig. 2, 5) and metatarsal (1, 6) bones and dental rows (3, 4) of A. parisiensis

In 1982, American palaeontologists Ian Tattersall and Jeffrey H. Schwartz recognized that "A." priscus had been previously reassigned to Leptadapis but suggested that it be transferred to another adapiform primate Smilodectes instead. In 1983, Tattersall and Schwartz considered both A. angustidens and P. filholi to be valid species. Tattersall and Schwartz the same year erected another genus Paradapis for the species "L." ruetimeyeri. In 1992, French palaeontologist Laurence Lanèque referenced both A. parisensis bruni and A. parisiensis schlosseri, elevating both subspecies to species rank as A. bruni and A. schlosseri. She had additionally resurrected the genus Palaeolemur, its only species being P. betillei. The same year, French palaeontologist Marc Godinot suggested that "A. parisiensis angustidens" and "A." angustidens were the same species and could both be synonymized with P. angustidens; thus, he argued, there was no need for the alternate species name P. filholi. He additionally revalidated A. stintoni and A. sudrei and tentatively reclassified Europolemur collinsonae to Adapis and A. laharpi to Cryptadapis. In another source dated to 1998, American primatologist John G. Fleagle accepted the validities of both Leptadapis and Microadapis but retained L. priscus within Leptadapis and did not recognize Palaeolemur, instead retaining its species in Adapis. Subsequent academic sources have recognized Palaeolemur as a distinct genus from Adapis. Hooker and Marc Weidmann in 2000 listed A. laharpi as a species of Adapis due to taxonomic problems relating to it and Cryptadapis. In 2004, German palaeontologist Jens Lorenz Franzen retained E. collinsonae within Europolemur. In 2008, British naturalists Jerry J. Hooker and D. L. Harrison erected the primate genus Vectipithex, transferring "A." ulmensis into it.

=== Classification ===
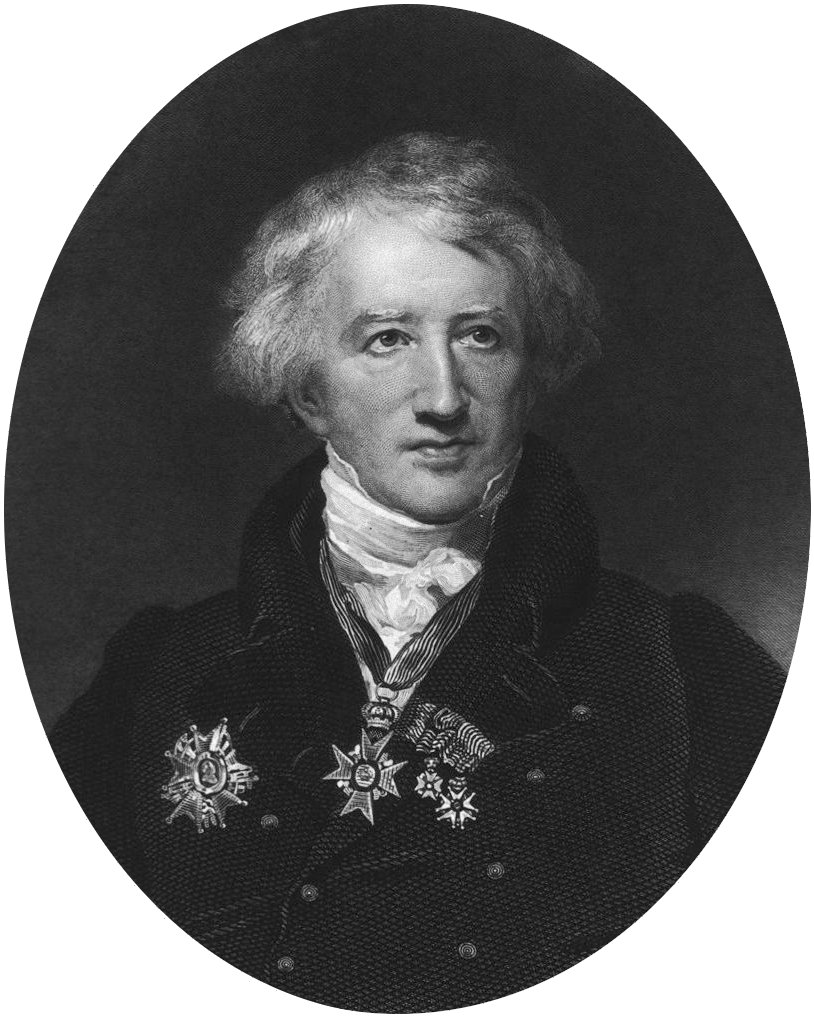
Portrait of Georges Cuvier, the French naturalist who described Adapis in 1822

Adapis is the type genus of the Adapidae, one of several families within the infraorder Adapiformes. The type species of Adapis is A. parisiensis. The Adapidae is typically considered to be part of the superfamily Adapoidea along with several other adapiform families like the Notharctidae and Sivaladapidae; various adapiform taxa have been considered as either family-rank or subfamily-rank (i.e. Notharctidae being subfamily-ranked within the Adapidae (Notharctinae) or Asiadapidae being subfamily-rank within the Northarctidae (Asiadapinae)). The phylogenetic assessments of the Adapiformes have historically considered it closest in modern analogue to the lemurs of Madagascar, but significant anatomical differences, particularly from dentition, have also put the extent of this hypothesis into question. The Adapiformes and by extent the Adapoidea have generally been grouped into the suborder Strepsirrhini (which today includes the Lemuriformes), but some researchers hold the alternate view that they were within Haplorhini (itself containing Tarsiiformes and Simiiformes). The order Primates (or "Euprimates") appeared during the Paleocene as evident by the presence of Altiatlasius during the epoch in Morocco but began diversifying by the Paleocene–Eocene thermal maximum. Within one to two million years into the Early Eocene, the primate clades Adapiformes (Adapoidea) and Omomyiformes (Omomyoidea) appeared and were both present in North America, Europe, and Asia, the former also having been present in Africa.

The Adapidae is a family of adapiforms that is known from Europe, Asia, and Africa and is thought to have ranged from the Middle Eocene to Late Eocene; a small tooth from the Swiss locality of Beuchille (dating to the Mammal Palaeogene zones unit of MP24) is thought to have possibly belonged to the Adapidae, which if true extends the family's record to the Early Oligocene. The Adapidae consists of two subfamilies, both of which are recorded from the Middle to Late Eocene: the Caenopithecinae and Adapinae, the latter of which was exclusive to Europe while the former was present in Europe, Asia, and Africa. Phylogenetic analyses suggest that both subfamilies are monophyletic.

While the evolutionary and geographical history of the Adapidae remains unclear, the family was likely of Asiatic origins and later dispersed to both Europe and Africa. The separate dispersals to different continents, as Marc Godinot and his fellow coauthors suggested, was supported by the "sudden" appearance of adapids in Europe by MP13 to MP14. The first appearances of adapids in Europe had therefore occurred long after the appearances of the first adapiform representatives in the continent by MP7. Both the Caenopithecinae and Adapinae are recorded in localities dating to MP13 as represented by the genera Caenopithecus, Microadapis, and Leptadapis. The temporal record of undisputed Caenopithecinae in Europe, represented solely by Caenopithecus, occurred in MP13 to MP14. In comparison, later representatives of the Adapinae like Adapis and Magnadapis are first recorded at MP16, although the unit also records the last known appearance of Microadapis. Leptadapis is last known by MP17b (if L? assolicus is not a Leptadapis species) whereas Adapis extended all the way to MP19.

An excerpt of a 2018 phylogenetic tree by Erik R. Seiffert et al. focusing on fossil primates, in particular a large part of the Adapiformes clade that includes an Adapis-Leptadapis clade within the Adapinae clade, is shown below:

- - Donrussellia provincialis
  - - - Cantius abditus
      - Cantius ralstoni
    - - - - Asiadapis cambayensis
          - Marcgodinotius indicus
        - - - Hoanghonius stehlini
            - Laomaki yunnanensis
          - - Rencunius zhoui
            - Yunnanadapis folivorus
      - - - Microadapis sciureus
          - - Pronycticebus gaudryi
            - Protoadapis curvicuspidens
        - - - Europolemur klatti
            - - Darwinius masillae
              - - Mahgarita stevensi
                - - Europolemur dunaifi
                  - - - - Adapis parisiensis
                        - Leptadapis magnus
                      - - Leptadapis priscus
                        - Leptadapis ruetimeyeri
                    - - Aframonius diedes
                      - - Masradapis tahai
                        - - Afradapis longicristatus
                          - Caenopithecus lemuroides
          - - - Algeripithecus minutus
              - - Azibius trerki
                - Rooneyia viejaensis
            - - - Mescalerolemur horneri
                - - - Anchomomys frontanyensis
                    - Anchomomys gaillardi
                  - - Mazateronodon endemicus
                    - Nievesia sossisensis
              - - Djebelemur martinezi
                - - Anchomomys milleri
                  - - Plesiopithecus teras
                    - Lemuriformes

== Description ==
=== Skull ===
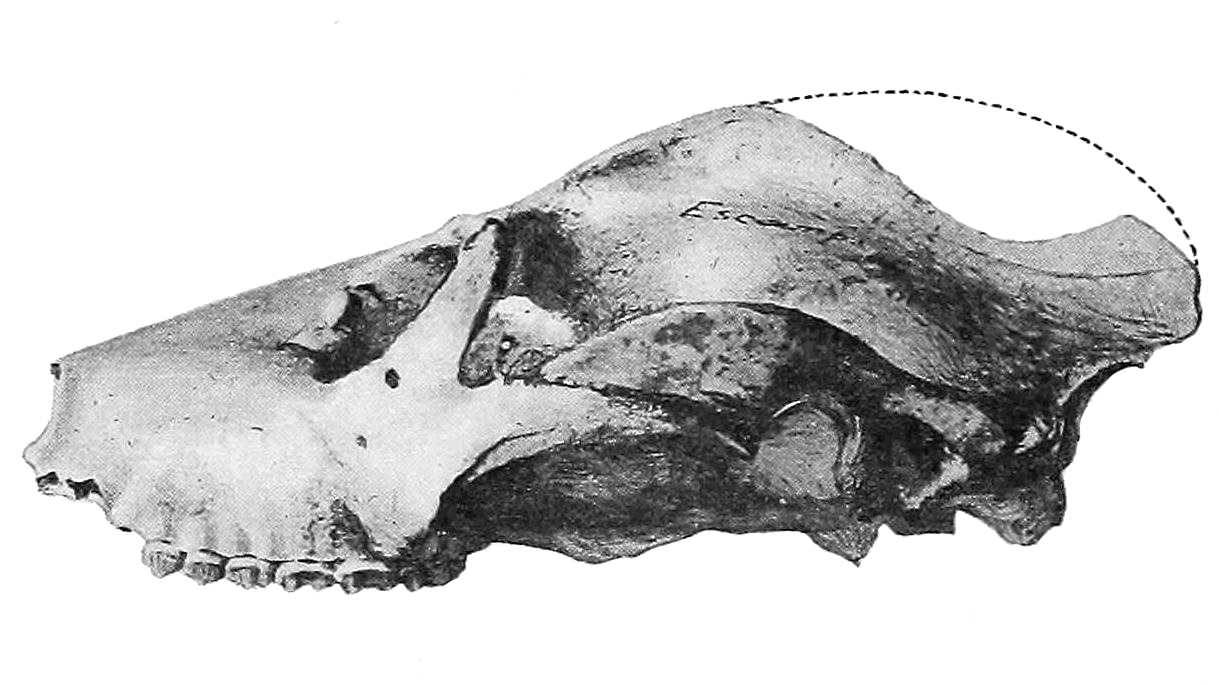
1905 image of the cranium of A. parisiensis, National Museum of Natural History, France

The family Adapidae is noted for multiple cranial features, namely the prominent facial region, high sagittal and occipital crests, a small and egg-shaped neurocranium (or braincase), and a robust but short mandible featuring a large angular region and a recurve-shaped coronoid process. The Adapinae is defined as having high sagittal crests, massive zygomatic arches, and small orbits. The large zygomatic arches as seen in Adapis and Leptadapis imply the prior presences of strong chewing muscles. Both adapine species A. parisiensis and L. magnus have small foramina magna relative to their body sizes in comparison to in modern primates. The prominent facial region in comparison to the braincase is a defining feature of the skull of Adapis, especially in comparison to those of lemuriforms. Adapis is also diagnosed in part by a greatly expanded mandibular angle and the coronoid process being slightly separated by a shallow notch from the condyle. According to Gingerich, Adapis displays strong evidence of sexual dimorphism, with male skulls being larger and more robust than female skulls in addition to the former featuring more prominent zygomatic arches and stronger sagittal crests and occipital crests. However, Lanèque later rejected his explanation, suggesting from a morphometric analysis of the muzzle region that morphological differences between Adapis individuals are greater than in extant primate species, even sexually dimorphic ones. She explained that the morphological differences in Adapis proves the existence of multiple species. A later allometric study indicated that two variation groups of Adapis can be discerned, although further investigations reportedly needed to be made on them: those with low muzzles and those with medium to high muzzles. Adapis differs from Leptadapis most notably on smaller orbits with stronger frontation and orbital convergence. It also differs from Palaeolemur based on a longer cranium but weaker orbit frontation and convergence.^{139}

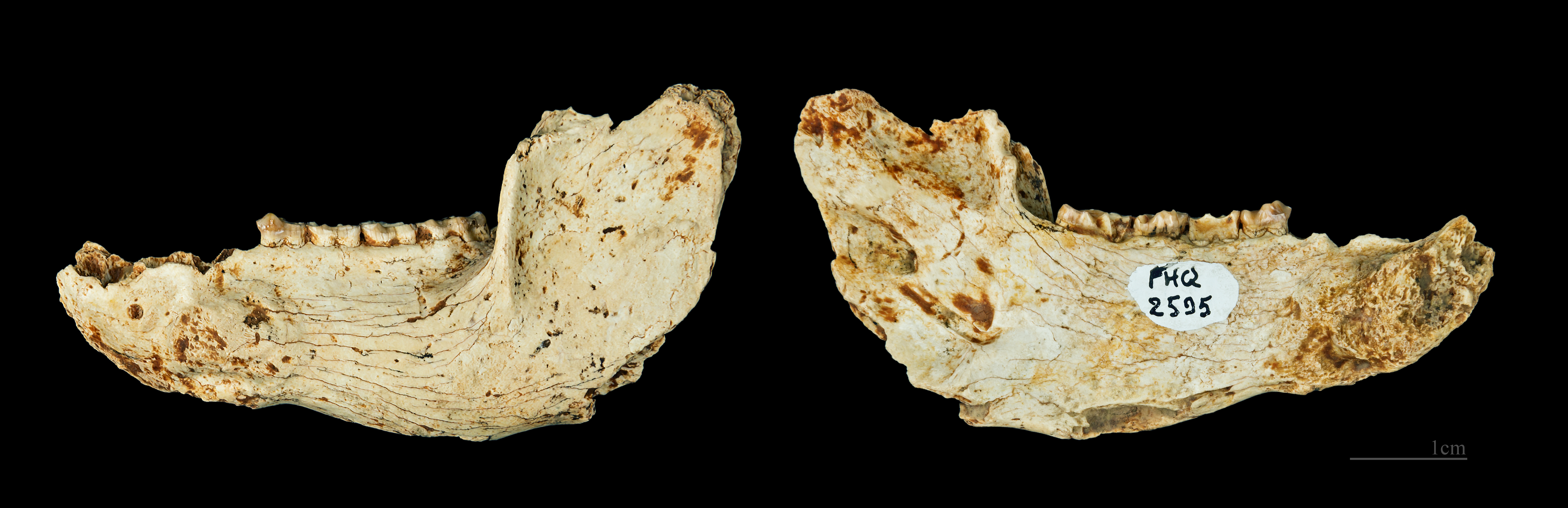
A. parisiensis mandible from different sides

The facial skeleton is moderately elongated while the zygomatic arches have strong projections dip relatively steep towards the surface of the maxilla. The small-sized braincase had led to the sagittal crest being robust to supplement the strength of the temporalis muscle. Such a small braincase had in part also resulted in a strong constriction of the orbits from behind to the point of lacking analogue among modern primates including those with similar traits like slow lorises (Nycticebus); greater galagos (Otolemur); and dwarf lemurs (Cheirogaleus), making the orbits themselves small.^{1191} According to Philip D. Gingerich and Robert D. Martin in 1981, the average diameters of the orbits of A. parisiensis based on three skulls of the species from the Natural History Museum, London and the University of Cambridge ranged from 13 mm (0.51 in) to 14.2 mm (0.56 in). Adapis was recorded to have had smaller orbits than extant lemurs, diurnal and nocturnal. In a 1993 article by Laurence Lanèque, the mean of the orbital diameter of Adapis was 12.79 mm (0.504 in) in a sample size of 18 skulls, smaller than in Leptadapis and modern primates; Adapis as a genus has a large range in orbital width. Adapis has generally greater-positioned front-facing orbits (or convergences) than Leptadapis, a trait caused by the former having smaller eyes that therefore are not shifted from the postorbital area by the zygomatic arch's presence. The plane of the orbital rim (the most anterior bony margin of the orbit) is forward-facing like in the ring-tailed lemur (Lemur catta) but is more oblique in angle, therefore pointing somewhat upward.^{1191} The upward-facing orbital planes seen in adapines point to weaker frontation compared to in most lemuriforms. The high convergences seen in the orbits of Adapis despite their small sizes imply that vision was a particularly vital trait for it. Laurence suggested that the degrees of orbital diameter, frontation, and convergence in adapines do not correlate with sexual dimorphism. In comparison to extant mammals, including non-adapid strepsirhine primates, the infraorbital foramen of Adapis, appears to be exceptionally small. Unlike in lemurs, the lacrimal bones of adapiforms like Adapis and Pronycticebus are reduced.^{57}

The premaxilla is a prominent feature in Adapis compared to in modern primates, and the maxilla somewhat contacts the nasal bones at their upper area. Like in lemurs, the nasals are narrow. The borders of the frontal bone and maxillae have corners that project. The front ends of the skull are short and wide, extending no farther than the anterior edge of the premaxilla. The frontal bones are very small, covering only a small part of the cerebrum. The jugal bone of Adapis resembles those of indris (Indri indri) but is thicker and more robust. Compared to in lemurs, the lacrimal region is not a major part of the facial skeleton of Adapis. The outline of the cranial vault, highlighted by the appearance of the sagittal crest, is strongly convex. The occipital bone, low and broad, is separated from the skull roof that is positioned posteriorly above the ear opening initially extends across the squamosal bone and mastoid processes' borders then takes a winglike shape and extends along the parietal and supraoccipital processes. The parietal bones form the largest section of the cranial vault and extends more in a lateral position than in the ring-tailed lemur. The extension of the squamosal bone, going from more than halfway between the ear opening and the sagittal crest, is greater than in lemurs. The palatine bone has a transversely concave form, its incisive foramen extending to the back or middle of the first bottom molar (M_{1}) and the greater palatine foramen being behind the maxillary suture.^{1192–1202} The diversity of the palate's shape in Adapis further attests to the existence of multiple species within the genus. The auditory bullae of adapiforms like Adapis and Notharctus are inflated and ossified, potentially implying auditory specializations over primitive conditions. The development of the tympanic cavity in Adapis is similar to that in Lemur, but the former may have been more advanced to a degree. The roof of the side chamber of the tympanic cavity is extended to the bottom of the cavity itself, appearing elongated at its middle. The promontory of the tympanic cavity appears to be a roughly egg-shaped projection positioned in a longitudinal axis.^{1211–1215} The tympanic bulla is large, formed by the periotic bone, and surrounds the developed hypotympanic sinus, itself separated from the tympanic cavity by a bony wall.^{57–58} The internal carotid artery passed through the middle ear to help transfer blood to the brain and has the stepedial branch and promontory branch, the former of which has a bony canal four times the size of that of the latter in A. parisiensis.

Like the zygomatic arch, the mandible is robust in form, therefore showing few analogues with lemurs. The anterior surface of the region of the mandibular symphysis is gently curved in both the vertical and horizontal directions. The end of the symphysis is usually aligned with the second bottom premolar (P_{2}) but can instead be aligned with its back. The horizontal ramus is thick and ascends in slope from the area of the chin to the end of area with dentition with a slightly convex curve. The angle of the mandible sometimes has a strong projection and can curve slightly inward. The ascending ramus can be diminished upwards due to the sloped position of its anterior margin. The coronoid process of the mandible is very elongated and ascends, although its ends up moderately narrower and curving at its back. The mandibular condyle is transversely elongated and projects slightly beyond the mandibular notch. The anterior borders of the insertion of the masseter muscles, part of the coronoid process of the mandible, are not distinct while the posterior border has the shape of a sharp crest. The border for the insertion of the temporalis muscles for the coronoid process also is as sharp in appearance and crestlike. The mandibular foramen is roughly aligned in position with the dental arch and is closer to the third lower molar (M_{3}) than the posterior border of the jaw.^{1219–1222} A. sudrei has an unfused mandibular symphysis while A. parisiensis has a fused one.

=== Endocast anatomy ===
The brain endocast anatomy of A. parisiensis had been first studied by L. Neumayer in 1906 based on an incomplete endocranial cast. Subsequent studies, starting from 1945 by British primatologist Wilfrid Le Gros Clark, primarily focused on a more complete specimen from A. parisiensis held at the Natural History Museum of London. The brain's form is primitive, as evident by the wide and poorly developed temporal lobes. It is seemingly more primitive in form than in any extant lemur. The brain is wide in relation to the temporal region, has a longitudinal fissure that is positioned nearly at the dorsal midline, and a cerebellum that is expanded at its back. The traits observed in the brain of Adapis have also been recorded in other adapiforms like Smilodectes and Notharctus. However, its brain was more advanced than those of Middle Eocene adapiforms because of the more well-developed lateral sulcus (or Sylvian sulcus) and a well-expanded frontal lobe. The frontal lobe in Adapis is smaller than in modern primates. The brain appears to be flattened in the vertical direction, causing the temporal lobes of both sides to be unusually spread outward. Several traits of the brain cast are considered evolutionarily primitive in nature, namely pedunculated and projecting olfactory bulbs, the cerebrum being small compared to the cerebellum, a very slim build of the frontal lobes at the cerebral hemisphere, and the small sized lateral lobes of the cerebellum. The temporal lobe of is larger than those of mammals with equivalent brain sizes. The cerebral hemisphere contains two prominent sulci: the lateral sulcus, which has an upward and backward oblique extension in between the frontal lobe and temporal lobe, and the longitudinal fissure, which extends back from the frontal lobe to the border of the occipital region. The extent of the longitudinal folding of the overall brain is consistent with the primitive form found in early eutherians. The olfactory bulbs are large, their approximate volumes relative to body weight falling into the range of extant nocturnal eulipotyphlans and lemuriforms. The flocculus of the cerebellum is huge, a primitive brain trait. The fissuring of the neocortex is very simple. The encephalization quotient of A. parisiensis, as calculated by Gingerich and Martin in 1981, is 0.45, meaning the brain relative to the body size is smaller than those of modern prosimians.

=== Dentition ===
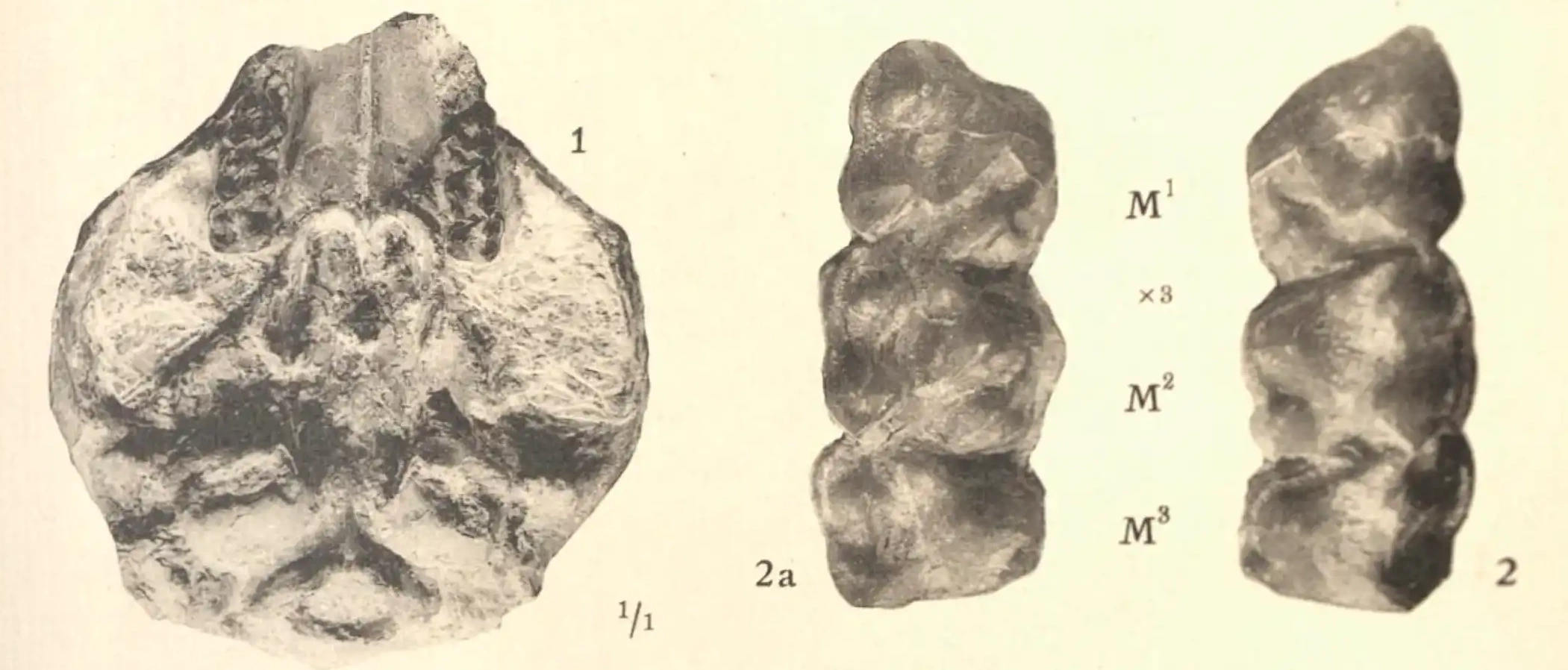
A. parisiensis partial skull with molars from Mormoiron

The Adapidae usually has a continuous dental series, meaning that the sets have no prominent diastemata. The incisors (I/i) are usually wide-crowned and sharp. The upper canines (C/c) are straight whereas the lower canines are short and premolariform. The upper molars (M/m) have three to four tubercles along with a large and V-shaped protocone cusp. The hypocone cusp is small and is formed from the back cingulum, and the mesostyle is usually gone. The lower molars have very reduced to lack of paraconid cusps and underdeveloped entoconid cusps. Other than on M_{3}, the hypoconulid is underdeveloped to absent on them. The dental formula of the Adapinae is 2.1.4.32.1.4.3 for a total of 40 teeth. Within the subfamily, the second premolars (P/p) are well-developed and the fourth ones are molarized. The upper molars do not have mesostyle cusps on them. In them, the crest between the protocone and metacone cusps are weak to absent.

In Adapis, the incisors are broad, nearly vertically implanted, and are spatula-shaped; these traits are typical of adapids. The canines are reduced to medium size but project significantly beyond the premolars and form cutting edges that essentially function like the incisors. The canines of Adapis strongly differ from most other adapids like Leptadapis, which have large and projecting canines. The dental row shows progressive size increases and molarizations from the first to fourth premolars; the fourth premolars are essentially molariform as a result. The cheek teeth, especially the molars, have sharp and high crests, a trait observed in other adapiforms like Notharctus and Sivaladapis. Both M^{1} and M^{2} have hypocones. M_{3} is elongated and, like in most other primitive primates, has well-developed hypoconulids.

=== Postcranial skeleton ===
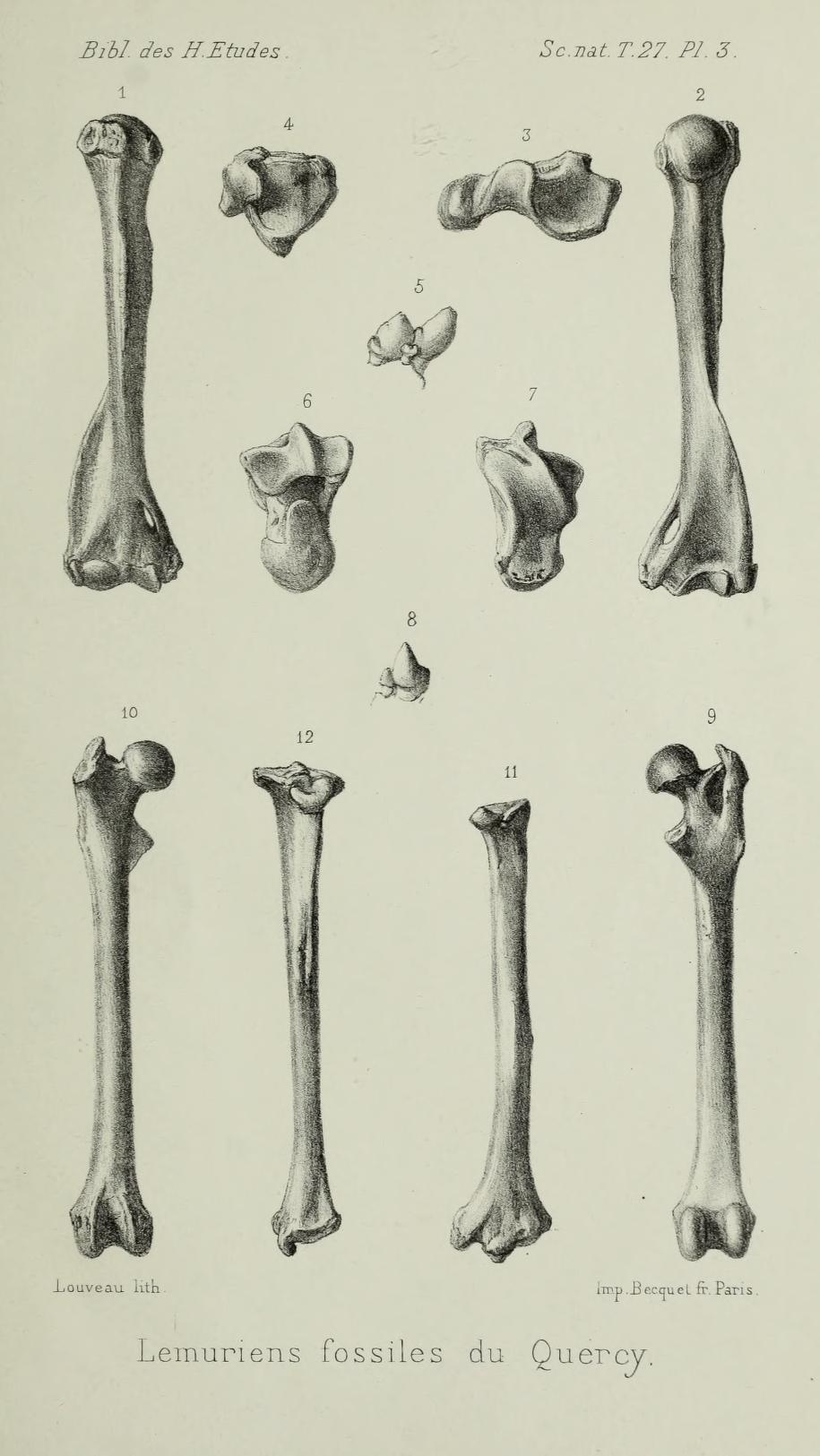
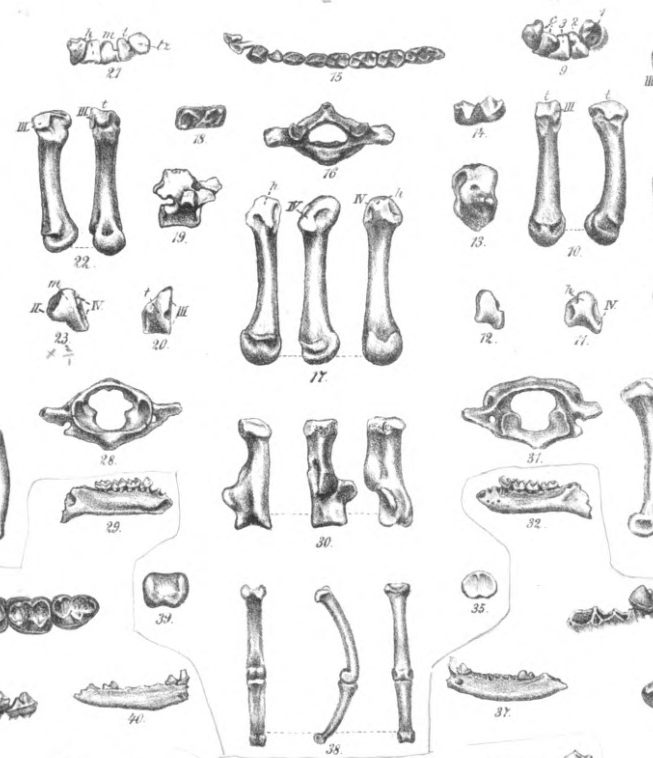
Illustrations of various assortments of postcranial fossils from 1883 (left) and 1887 (right), many of which were assigned to A. parisiensis

The postcranial skeleton of the Adapinae is diagnosed with several traits, among them the forelimbs and hindlimbs being about as equally long and the metacarpal bones being as long as the bottom phalanx bones. The intratrochanteric fossa of the femur is short. The front of the calcaneus and the neck of the astragalus are both short. The astragalus' trochlea is described as proximodistally long and having relatively parallel ridges while its shelf is small. The cuboid bone, from a back perspective, is shaped like a square. The postcranial anatomy of adapines is considered by researchers to be drastically different from other adapiforms. Postcranial fossil evidence of Adapis is known primarily from limb bones, as there are very few vertebrae known for it but not Leptadapis. The first postcranial fossil evidence of the Adapidae to have been described was a fragmented proximal humerus by Gaudry in 1875 (later figured in 1878 and assigned to A. parisiensis by the same author). Additional postcranial fossils were later first described by Filhol in 1882 and by German palaeontologist Max Schlosser in 1887. The only known bones of the spinal column of A. parisiensis are the axis and the first thoracic vertebra, both of which were described by Schlosser in 1887 as being typical of primates, especially resembling that of Lemur. He argued that Adapis had a tail as long as a ring-tailed lemur because of his speculation that it probably had many caudal vertebrae but provided no evidence to his claim. A. parisiensis is known postcranially from multiple limb bones, namely the humerus, radius, ulna, tibia, and femur; some of the bones were described in the 19th century while some others like the radius and ulna were unknown until later studies in the 20th century. The robustness of the limb bones of A. parisiensis are similar to those of modern strepsirrhines. While most postcranial remains belonging to the Adapinae are assigned to A. parisiensis, evidence based on geochronology and the morphology of the bones suggest that the bones themselves potentially represent multiple species of Adapis.

==== Front limbs ====
The length of the humerus is equivalent to 85% of that of the femur and 95% of that of the tibia. The head of the humerus is similar to in other strepsirrhines because of it being round and facing the back. Neither the greater tubercle nor lesser tubercle, despite being prominent enough, extend beyond the head. The humerus of Adapis contrasts with those of most other strepsirrhines based on a broader and shallower bicipital groove, a thick ridged deltopectoral crest, the tuberosity for the teres major muscle being prominent and extensive at the sides, and the small-sized brachioradialis crest extending forward; the last trait is shared with Notharctus and is thought to have been a primitive trait. Adapis differs from other adapiforms in the trochlea of the humerus being short and conical like in lorisines. Both the radius and ulna are thick and robust. The back articular surface of the radius is high in the dorso-palmar direction, and the ulnar styloid process is high; round; and, in certain aspects, broad and compressed.

Adapis has the shortest hand of all known Eocene-aged adapiforms relative to their forearm lengths and also differ from them by the shorter digits and longer metacarpal bones. The scaphoid bone is thin, its palmar tubercle that projects from the plane of the facet for articulation to the radius. The ulnar surface of the scaphoid for articulation with the lunate bone is flat. The extra digit, called the prepollex, is very small and has two articular facets. The centrale bone has a more extensive rectangular dorsal surface than that of Smilodectes gracilis. Its back articulation with the trapezoid bone is flat. Compared to living strepsirrhines, A. parisiensis did not have articulation of the centrale and hamate bones. The lunate bone has a convex articular facet for the radius that is faced dorsally, and its palmar surface is extensive, triangular, and seemingly does not articulate with other bones. The dorsal surface of the triquetral bone is similar to those of other lemuriforms while its radial side has a notable articular facet for the lunate bone. The trapezium bone is noted for unusual traits compared to extant primates, namely its relatively thin shape in terms of the dorso-palmar area with a convex and triangle-shaped dorsal surface and the presence of a thin and concave facet that articulates with the trapezoid. The trapezoid's largest side is a distal surface that articulates with the second metacarpal bone. The capitate bone is elongated in the proximo-distal direction and extended radially. The hamate bone is both extensive in multiple directions and large, the proximal facet for the triquetrum being broad and a mix of concave and convex, the distal facets for the fourth and fifth metacarpal bones being somewhat concaves, and the hamulus having a moderate form. Adapis having a pronograde body position (body parallel with the ground) is evident by the dorsiflexion (or bending movement to the back) of the hand's postures, making it differ from Notharctus.

The overall morphology of the metacarpals is more similar to lemurs than lorisines. The metacarpal bones are thick, their distal heads being inflated in appearance. A palmar process is present on the first and fifth metacarpals, although that on the latter is not as extensive. The third metacarpal is the largest front digit followed by the fourth, second, fifth, and first ones. The first metacarpal is the thickest dorsally followed by the third, second, fourth, and fifth digits. The proximal phalanges are shorter than those of Smilodectes and are slightly curved, their distal articular surfaces being extended palmarly. The proximal phalanges also imply a greater degree of bending movements for digits in regard to hand postures than in Smilodectes. The distal phalanges are very short and appear high when viewed sideways.

==== Hind limbs ====
The greater trochanter of the femur is relatively small and it about equal in height to the femoral head; it is a derived primate trait also found in other strepsirrhines including other adapiforms but differs from most of them in its less laterally extensive shape. The lesser trochanter is more of a large and flat plane that is medial in angle like in some extant strepsirrhines and is positioned more distally in relation to the body of the femur than is typically known for most strepsirrhines except large-sized lorisines. The lesser trochanter is also described as triangular in shape like in Palaeolemur and New World monkeys. Like in lorisines, the third trochanter is very small. The femoral head is nearly spherical and has a proximomedial orientation like in several strepsirrhines, and the femoral neck is short. The small femoral neck and greater trochanter makes the femur's front end appear narrow like those of lorisines. The trochanteric fossa is deep and narrow. The femoral body is straight, but its front end slightly bends anteroposteriorly. The back end of the femur differs from most strepsirrhines and adapiforms in its greater broadness than deepness and the patellar surface of the femur being broad and flat. The body of the tibia is also straight and has a small lateral curve at its front part like in Lemur; its back end is triangular in outline while its side surfaces slope medially. The tibial malleolus, as in other strepsirrhines, is both short and hook-shaped. The malleolar sulcus, a groove for the tibialis posterior and flexor digitorum longus muscles, is deep.

The astragali of Adapis and Leptadapis, like those of other Palaeogene primates, have rounded naviculoastragalar and astragalocalcaneal facets. The astragalus of Adapis has a mix of primitive and derived traits among primates. Its trochlea is a surface that is long, broad, and with middle and side crests that are all well-developed in height. It extends into the astragalus' neck, forms a "squatting facet", and makes up for 61% of the total length of the astragalus. The astragalus' body is flattened in the dorsoventral area like in lorisines and unlike in other strepsirrhines. The medial facet, articulating with the malleolus of the tibia, has a deep concavity distally next to the astragalur neck. The astragalar head is shaped like an ovoid and is large. The calcaneus of Adapis is similar to that of Leptadapis. The astragalus of the adapids differ from those of other strepsirrhines based on the lack of any front elongation. Otherwise, the calcaneum of the adapids are very similar to those of other strepsirrhines. The calcaneum of Adapis differs from Leptadapis only in the less-developed peroneal tubercle in the former.

The metatarsal bones are about as long relative to body sizes as those of Leptadapis and are more comparable to lemurids than those with short metatarsals like Notharctus and lorisines. The distal ends of the metatarsals of both Adapis and Leptadapis were relatively wider than in lemurids and are more comparable in size to Notharctus and lorisines. The first metatarsal is an opposable hallux (or big toe) with a large and distal-oriented peroneal tubercle, a surface to articulate with the entocuneiform bone, and a head oriented to the middle. The base (or proximal area) of the other four metatarsal bones of Adapis and Leptadapis appear to be primitive and generalized forms like in lemurs and unlike in lorisines. The two adapid genera differ from Lemur based on the second metatarsal's base not being as laterally extensive and the side process of the fifth metatarsal being large (a trait more pronounced in Leptadapis). The proximal phalanges of the two adapid genera are slightly shorter than the metatarsals. The similarities of the hind feet bones of adapids and non-adapid strepsirrhines might suggest that the former also shared with the latter the presence of prehensile hands and feet. The adapine genera were also potentially plantigrade in foot locomotion like the ring-tailed lemur.

=== Size ===
Estimated Adapis species size comparisons based on known fossil specimens

Adapis is described as an adapid of medium size in contrast to some of the larger genera like Leptadapis and Magnadapis; the larger-sized Adapis species and smaller-sized Leptadapis species appear to roughly correspond in size, however. Adapis has a wide range in skull size. According to Gingerich and Martin (some measurements estimated), the condylobasal lengths of two male A. parisiensis, one from the University of Cambridge and another from the Natural History Museum, London, and one female A. parisiensis skull from the London museum measured 75 mm (3.0 in), 75.5 mm (2.97 in), and 65 mm (2.6 in), respectively. The maximum skull lengths of the two male skulls from the aforementioned museums are 84 mm (3.3 in) and 85 mm (3.3 in), respectively. The width of the Cambridge male skull is 55.5 mm (2.19 in) whereas the other male skull from the London museum is 54.5 mm (2.15 in) and the female skull from the London museum 45 mm (1.8 in). Jonathan M.G. Perry et al. listed cranial measurements for Adapis as well, the A. parisiensis cranium lengths measuring from 61.59 mm (2.425 in) to 89.07 mm (3.507 in). Two crania of A. bruni are 69.70 mm (2.744 in) and 74.90 mm (2.949 in) long, respectively. A cranium of A. schlosseri measures 83.94 mm (3.305 in) long while another of A. cf. schlosseri is 76.25 mm (3.002 in) long and A. sp. 68.40 mm (2.693 in) long. The cranium of Palaeolemur has a comparable cranium length of 65 mm (2.6 in) while the listed Leptadapis and Magnadapis skulls all measured more than 100 mm (3.9 in) long.

Adapids are relatively small primates, but European species showed generally increased body weight over the course of evolutionary history. Gingerich in one article said that based on two skulls, A. parisiensis had a body weight of 2 kg (4.4 lb) based on the size of M^{1}. In a later study from Gingerich and Martin, two male A. parisiensis individuals measured 2.35 kg (5.2 lb) and 2.45 kg (5.4 lb) in average weight. They also suggested that female individuals probably had an average weight of 1.6 kg (3.5 lb) and male individuals 2.4 kg (5.3 lb). According to a doctorate thesis by Jacqueline Angelique Runestad, the body mass distribution of Adapis can be separated into two groups that suggest multiple species in the sample: one of individuals with weights of between 1.5 kg (3.3 lb) to 2.5 kg (5.5 lb) and another between 3 kg (6.6 lb) and 4 kg (8.8 lb). Perry et al. listed the weight range of Adapis at 1.1 kg (2.4 lb) to 3.9 kg (8.6 lb), significantly lighter than Leptadapis at 4.3 kg (9.5 lb) to 11.4 kg (25 lb). Arianna R. Harrington et al. documented dramatic body mass estimate differences for A. parisiensis (in particular a skull from the Natural History Museum, London) due to different equations. The M^{1} equation yielded a body mass estimate of 1.074 kg (2.37 lb) for A. parisiensis while the skull length equation as applied to the same individual yielded another estimate of 2.602 kg (5.74 lb).

== Palaeobiology ==
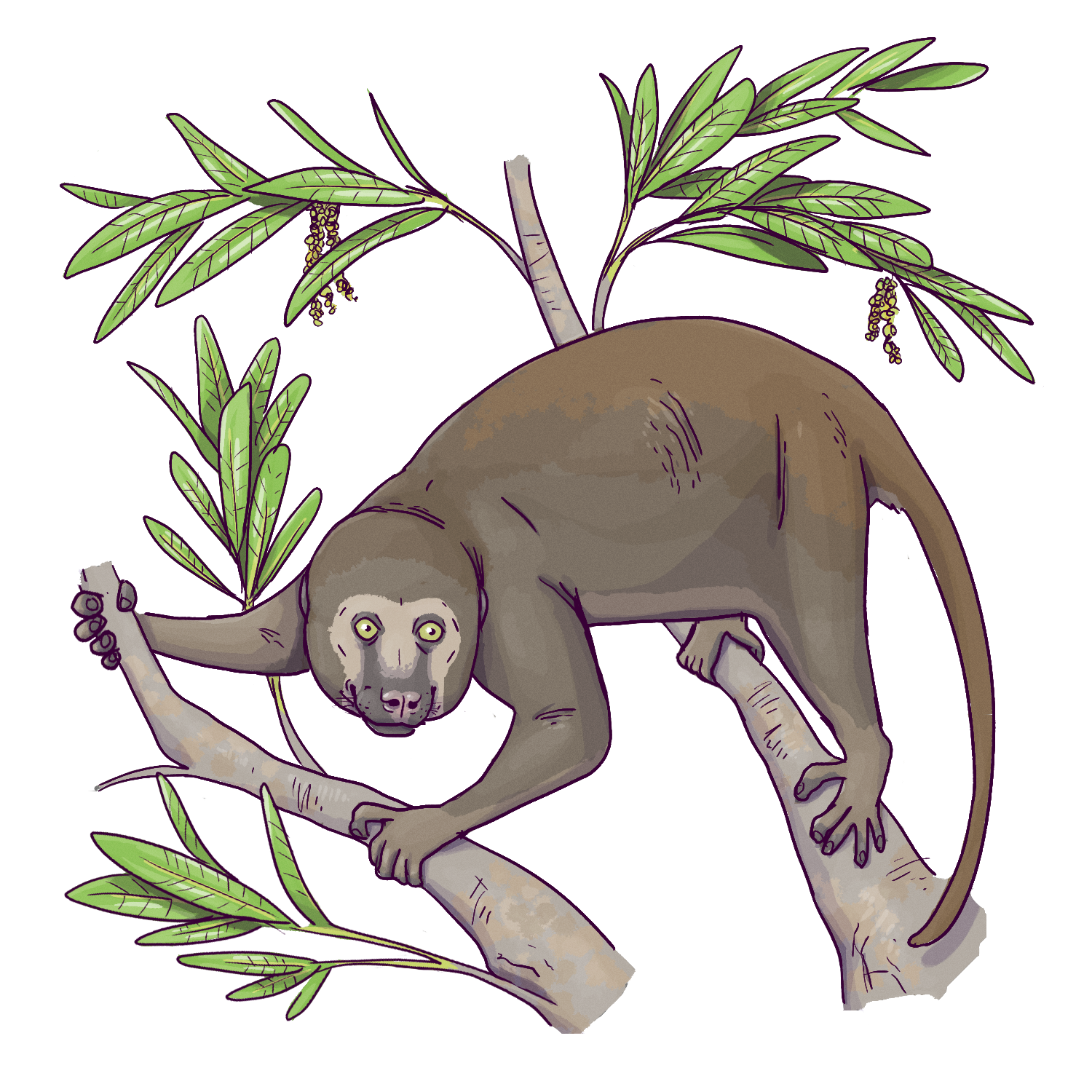
Life restorations of A. parisiensis climbing on between branches of Eotrigonobalanus

Many studies on the dentitions of adapids suggest primarily folivorous (leaf-eating) diets, although others had also suggested at least some extent of frugivorous (fruit-eating) and insectivorous (insect-eating) diets as well. The small body size and the high and crested molars with shearing crests both suggest that Adapis was folivorous and frugivorous in dietary habits, probably largely leaning towards the former but with no dietary specialization. While the large cranial crest of Adapis and Leptadapis have been suggested as evidence of folivory, mammals that eat hard objects like seeds also have similar traits. The temporalis mass for Adapis, relative to the mandible's size, is average while the bite force of it and Leptadapis are high compared to in extant strepsirrhines because of greater jaw adductor muscle leverage. Adapis and Leptadapis do not show any adaptations towards gaping capacity and therefore did not appear to have tree-gouged (or consumed exudate on trees after biting on them) or consumed large and ripe fruits. Evidence for folivory in adapines like Adapis, Leptadapis, and Palaeolemur are further supported by the constrictions of the front talonid basin and the high degree of torsion of the trigonid, traits also observed in extant folivorous primates. The ears of A. parisiensis were seemingly more sensitive to high frequencies than low frequencies; its hearing range supports the theory that A. parisiensis was a solitary and monogamous primate that lived in small territory ranges. Although Adapis had small orbits, it probably did not have poor vision, as demonstrated by extant mammals with small orbits but keen vision. Some authors have suggested that the small orbits of Adapis meant that it was diurnal in activity, but Lanèque argued that orbits sizes do not accurately predict activity patterns. The potential presence of keen vision in Adapis could have been due to the brain morphology of the occipital and temporal lobes like in extant primates.

There is no close modern analogue to A. parisiensis in postcranial anatomy. Historically, palaeontologists suggested that Adapis was closest to lorisines in locomotion. While Adapis shares many similar postcranial traits to lorisines, some are more aligned with the anatomies of lemurs. Thus, Adapis did not have the same levels of limb mobility or strong grasps like lorisines did. Marian Dagosto speculated that Adapis was a slow-moving and non-leaping arboreal quadruped with no strict mobility preferences for the forelimb or hindlimb, moving. She also wrote that Adapis probably sought continuous large-sized objects for arboreal movements rather than "bridging" (or extending all its limbs to move between two surfaces) as seen in lorisines. Pottos (Perodicticus) have been suggested as an analogue for Adapis in arboreal locomotion. Some studies supported the idea of A. parisiensis being a slow climber while some others like Godinot and F. K. Jouffroy in 1984 suggested that Adapis was a tree walker-runner. Godinot in 1991 interpreted A cf. parisiensis from Rosières as a branch walker-runner, differing from Palaeolemur betillei, which he wrote was more of an arboreal locomotor. In a 2017 article, Margot Bernardi and Sébastien Couette argued that the coefficient of agility of A. parisiensis demonstrates that it was a slow to medium slow quadrupedal climber like the red slender loris (Loris tardigradus). Doug M. Boyer et al. in 2013 hypothesized that A. parisiensis had a mobile wrist for increased climbing as an arboreal quadruped. Judit Marigó et al. in 2019 agreed with previous studies demonstrating that Adapis did not have any adaptation towards vertical clinging and leaping. However, they also brought up the possibility that Adapis species were broad in category for arboreal quadrupeds and could even have had different specializations in locomotion. Still, they agreed that Adapis overall did not show the same types of specializations that extant slow-climbing primates had.

== Palaeoecology ==
=== Middle Eocene ===
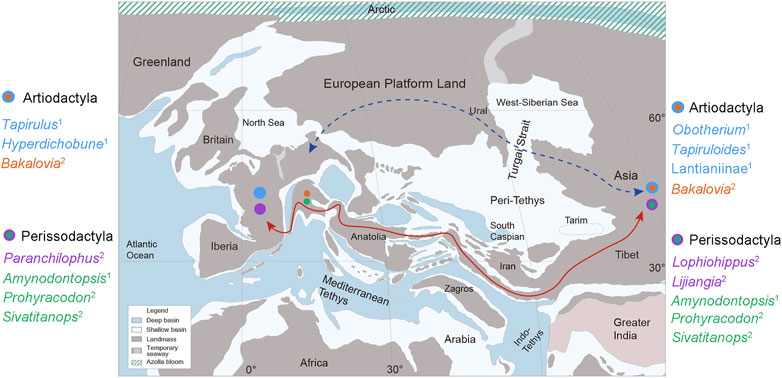
Palaeogeography of Europe and Asia during the Middle Eocene with possible artiodactyl and perissodactyl dispersal routes.

For much of the Eocene, a hothouse climate with humid, tropical environments with consistently high precipitations prevailed. Modern mammalian orders including the Perissodactyla, Artiodactyla, and Primates (or the suborder Euprimates) appeared already by the Early Eocene, diversifying rapidly and developing dentitions specialized for folivory. The omnivorous forms mostly either switched to folivorous diets or went extinct by the Middle Eocene (47–37 million years ago) along with the archaic "condylarths". By the Late Eocene (approx. 37–33 mya), most of the ungulate form dentitions shifted from bunodont (or rounded) cusps to cutting ridges (i.e. lophs) for folivorous diets.

Land connections between western Europe and North America were interrupted around 53 Ma. From the Early Eocene up until the Grande Coupure extinction event (56–33.9 mya), western Eurasia was separated into three landmasses: western Europe (an archipelago), Balkanatolia (in-between the Paratethys Sea of the north and the Neotethys Ocean of the south), and eastern Eurasia. The Holarctic mammalian faunas of western Europe were therefore mostly isolated from other landmasses including Greenland, Africa, and eastern Eurasia, allowing for endemism to develop. Therefore, the European mammals of the Late Eocene (MP17–MP20 of the Mammal Palaeogene zones) were mostly descendants of endemic Middle Eocene groups.

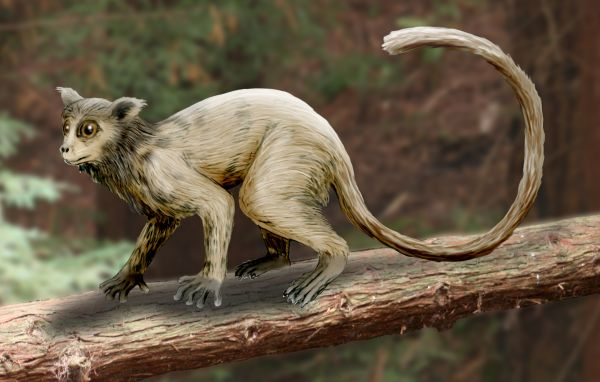
Restoration of Necrolemur, a contemporaneous primate that coexisted with Adapis in the Middle to Late Eocene

The earliest species of Adapis to have appeared were A. aff. parisiensis, A. sudrei, and A. laharpi, the latter two of which appeared exclusively in localities dating to MP16. The former two appeared in the French locality of Robiac while the latter is known from the Swiss site of Eclépens-Gare and the British locality of Creechbarrow. The earliest species of Adapis coexisted in western Europe with perissodactyls (Palaeotheriidae, Lophiodontidae, and Hyrachyidae), non-endemic artiodactyls (Dichobunidae and Tapirulidae), endemic European artiodactyls (Choeropotamidae, Cebochoeridae, Mixtotheriidae, Anoplotheriidae, Amphimerycidae, and Xiphodontidae), and other primates (Omomyidae (subfamily Microchoerinae). It also cooccurred with metatherians (Herpetotheriidae), rodents (Ischyromyidae, Theridomyoidea, Gliridae), eulipotyphlans, bats, apatotherians, carnivoraformes (Miacidae), and hyaenodonts (Hyainailourinae, Proviverrinae).

In the MP16 locality of Robiac, A. aff. parisiensis and A. sudrei were present with the herpetotheriids Amphiperatherium and Peratherium, apatemyid Heterohyus, nyctithere Saturninia, omomyids (Necrolemur, Pseudoloris, and Microchoerus), ischyromyid Ailuravus, glirid Glamys, pseudosciurid Sciuroides, theridomyids Elfomys and Pseudoltinomys, hyaenodonts (Paracynohyaenodon, Paroxyaena, and Cynohyaenodon), carnivoraformes (Simamphicyon, Quercygale, and Paramiacis), cebochoerids Cebochoerus and Acotherulum, choeropotamids Choeropotamus and Haplobunodon, tapirulid Tapirulus, anoplotheriids (Dacrytherium, Catodontherium, and Robiatherium, dichobunid Mouillacitherium, robiacinid Robiacina, xiphodonts (Xiphodon, Dichodon, Haplomeryx), amphimerycid Pseudamphimeryx, lophiodont Lophiodon, hyrachyid Chasmotherium, and other palaeotheres (Palaeotherium, Plagiolophus, Leptolophus, Anchilophus, Metanchilophus, Lophiotherium, Pachynolophus, Eurohippus). MP16 was also the period marking a major faunal turnover caused by major environmental shifts, although the environments were still subhumid and full of subtropical evergreen forests.

=== Late Eocene ===
Beginning after MP16, newer species of Adapis made appearances in the fossil record, in particular A. cf. parisiensis from the MP17a locality of the Spanish locality of Sossís. A. stintoni is recorded from the British localities of the Totland Bay Member of the Hordle Cliff and Headon Hill localities (dating to MP17a and MP17b, respectively) and the Hatherwood Limestone Member of the Headon Hill Formation (MP18). A. parisiensis is recorded from localities dating to MP18 (French locality of La Débruge) and MP19 (French localities of Escamps and Rosières 2). In the late Eocene, the endemic artiodactyl family Cainotheriidae made its first appearance while several migrant mammal groups had reached western Europe by MP17a-MP18, namely the Anthracotheriidae, Hyaenodontinae, and Amphicyonidae.

In the locality of La Débruge, A. parisiensis is recorded with the likes of the herpetotheriids Peratherium and Amphiperatherium, nyctitheres Saturninia and Euronyctia, ischyromyid Plesiarctomys, theridomyids Theridomys and Blainvillimys, glirid Glamys, hyaenodontids Pterodon and Hyaenodon, amphicyonid Cynodictis, palaeotheres (Palaeotherium, Plagiolophus, Metanchilophus), dichobunid Dichobune, choeropotamid Choeropotamus, cebochoerids Cebochoerus and Acotherulum, tapirulid Tapirulus, amphimerycid Amphimeryx, xiphodonts Xiphodon and Dichodon, anoplotheriids (Anoplotherium, Diplobune, Dacrytherium), cainothere Oxacron, anthracothere Elomeryx, omomyid Necrolemur, bat Stehlinia, and the testudines Landreatchelys and Cheirogaster. A decrease in body size of adapids over the course of the Eocene could have been tied to changes in periods of gestation (or births) and lifespans, all in correlations with rapid reproduction rates in response to major climactic changes. The diversity of the Adapidae declined in the Late Eocene with the last known records of Adapis and Palaeolemur, although it is unclear if the Adapidae could have survived to MP24, dated to the Early Oligocene.
