= Adapinae =

Adapinae Temporal range: Eocene

Scientific classification
- Kingdom: Animalia
- Phylum: Chordata
- Class: Mammalia
- Order: Primates
- Suborder: Strepsirrhini
- Family: †Adapidae
- Subfamily: †Adapinae; Trouessart, 1879

Genera
- †Adapis; †Cryptadapis; †Leptadapis; †Magnadapis; †Microadapis; †Palaeolemur; †Paradapis

Extinct subfamily of primates

Adapinae is a subfamily within the extinct primate family Adapidae, primarily found in Europe until the end of the Eocene. They are thought to have originated in Asia.
