= Lynn Emanuel =

American poet

Lynn Collins Emanuel (born March 14, 1949) is an American poet. Some of her poetry collections are Then, Suddenly— and Noose and Hook (University of Pittsburgh Press).

She has received two grants from the National Endowment for the Arts and the Eric Matthieu King Award from the Academy of American Poets. She also won the 1992 National Poetry Series Open Competition for The Dig, and has been awarded a Pushcart Prize. Her poems have been published in literary magazines and journals including Parnassus, The American Poetry Review, Poetry, Boston Review, Harvard Review, The Hudson Review, Slate and Ploughshares, and in anthologies including The Best American Poetry anthologies in 1994, 1995, 1998, 1999, and 2000, and the Oxford Book of American Poetry (Oxford University Press, 2006).

Emanuel is Director of the Writing Program, and Director of the Pittsburgh Contemporary Writers Series, and a professor of English at the University of Pittsburgh. She has also taught at the Warren Wilson Program in Creative Writing, and the Iowa Writers’ Workshop. She is married to the anthropologist, Jeffrey H. Schwartz, and they reside in Pittsburgh, Pennsylvania. The early primate Microadapis lynnae is named after her.

== Personal ==
Emanuel was born in Mt. Kisco, New York and has lived, worked, and traveled in North Africa, Europe, and the Near East. She received a B.A. from Bennington College in 1972, and an M.A. from City College of New York in 1975, and an M.F.A. from the Iowa Writers' Workshop, University of Iowa in 1983.

== Bibliography ==
- The Nerve of It: Poems New and Selected, poetry (Pittsburgh: University of Pittsburgh Press, 2015, and winner of the 2016 Lenore Marshall Poetry Prize)
- Noose and Hook, poetry (Pittsburgh: University of Pittsburgh Press, 2010)
- Then, Suddenly—, poetry (Pittsburgh: University of Pittsburgh Press, 1999)
- The Dig, poetry (Urbana: University of Illinois Press, 1992)
- Hotel Fiesta, poetry (Athens: University of Georgia Press, 1984)
- Oblique Light, poetry (Pittsburgh: Slow Loris Press, 1979)
