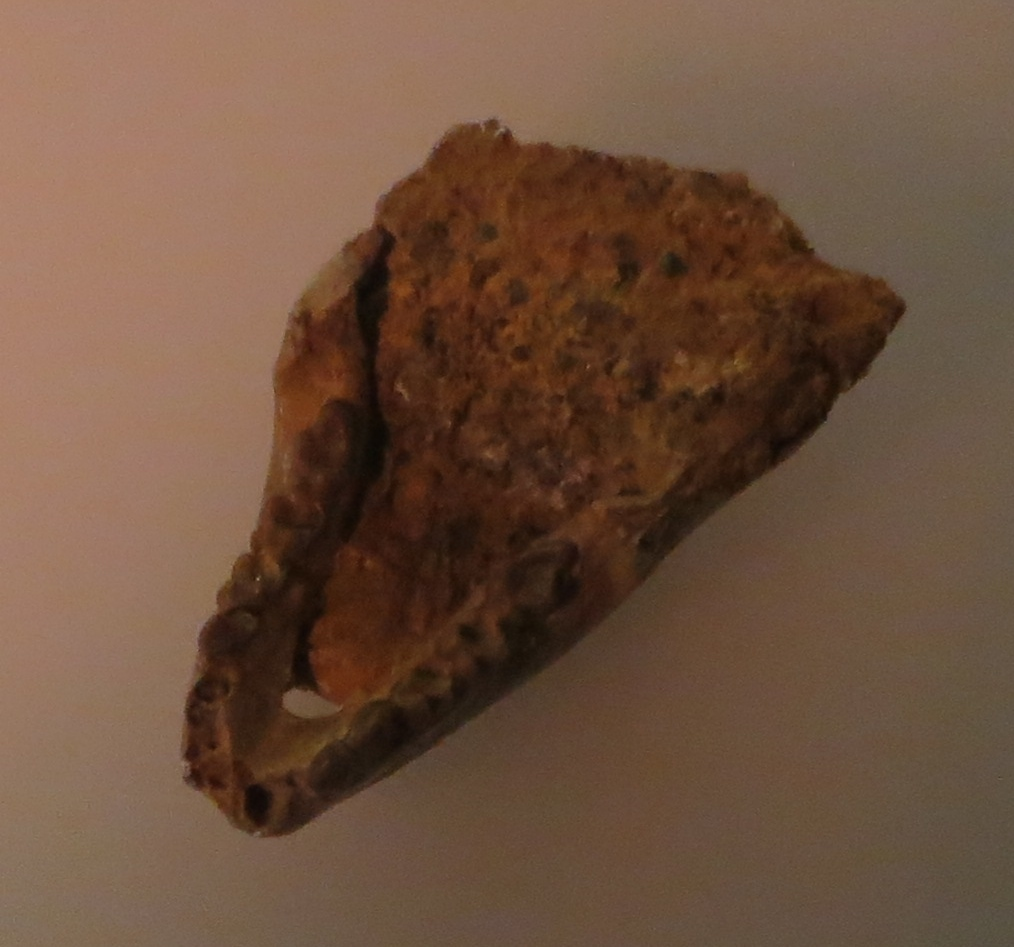
- Jaw

Scientific classification
- Domain: Eukaryota
- Kingdom: Animalia
- Phylum: Chordata
- Class: Mammalia
- Order: Primates
- Suborder: Strepsirrhini
- Family: †Adapidae
- Genus: †Caenopithecus; Rütimeyer, 1862
- Species: †C. lemuroides

Binomial name
- †Caenopithecus lemuroides Rütimeyer, 1862

= Caenopithecus =

Caenopithecus Temporal range: Middle Eocene

Extinct genus of primates

Caenopithecus is a genus of adapiform primate that lived in Europe during the middle Eocene.
