= Magnadapis =

Magnadapis Temporal range: Late Eocene

Scientific classification
- Kingdom: Animalia
- Phylum: Chordata
- Class: Mammalia
- Infraclass: Placentalia
- Order: Primates
- Suborder: Strepsirrhini
- Family: †Adapidae
- Subfamily: †Adapinae
- Genus: †Magnadapis; Godinot & Couette, 2008

Species
- †M. quercyi Godinot & Couette, 2008; †M. fredi Godinot & Couette, 2008; †M. laurenceae Godinot & Couette, 2008; †M. intermedius Godinot & Couette, 2008

Extinct genus of primates

Magnadapis is a genus of adapiform primate that lived in Europe during the late Eocene.
