= Cryptadapis =

Cryptadapis Temporal range: Late Eocene

Scientific classification
- Domain: Eukaryota
- Kingdom: Animalia
- Phylum: Chordata
- Class: Mammalia
- Order: Primates
- Suborder: Strepsirrhini
- Family: †Adapidae
- Subfamily: †Adapinae
- Genus: †Cryptadapis; Godinot, 1984

Type species
- †Cryptadapis tertius Godinot, 1984

Species
- †Cryptadapis laharpei Godinot, 1984; †Cryptadapis tertius Godinot, 1984

Extinct genus of primates

Cryptadapis is a genus of adapiform primate that lived in Europe during the late Eocene.
