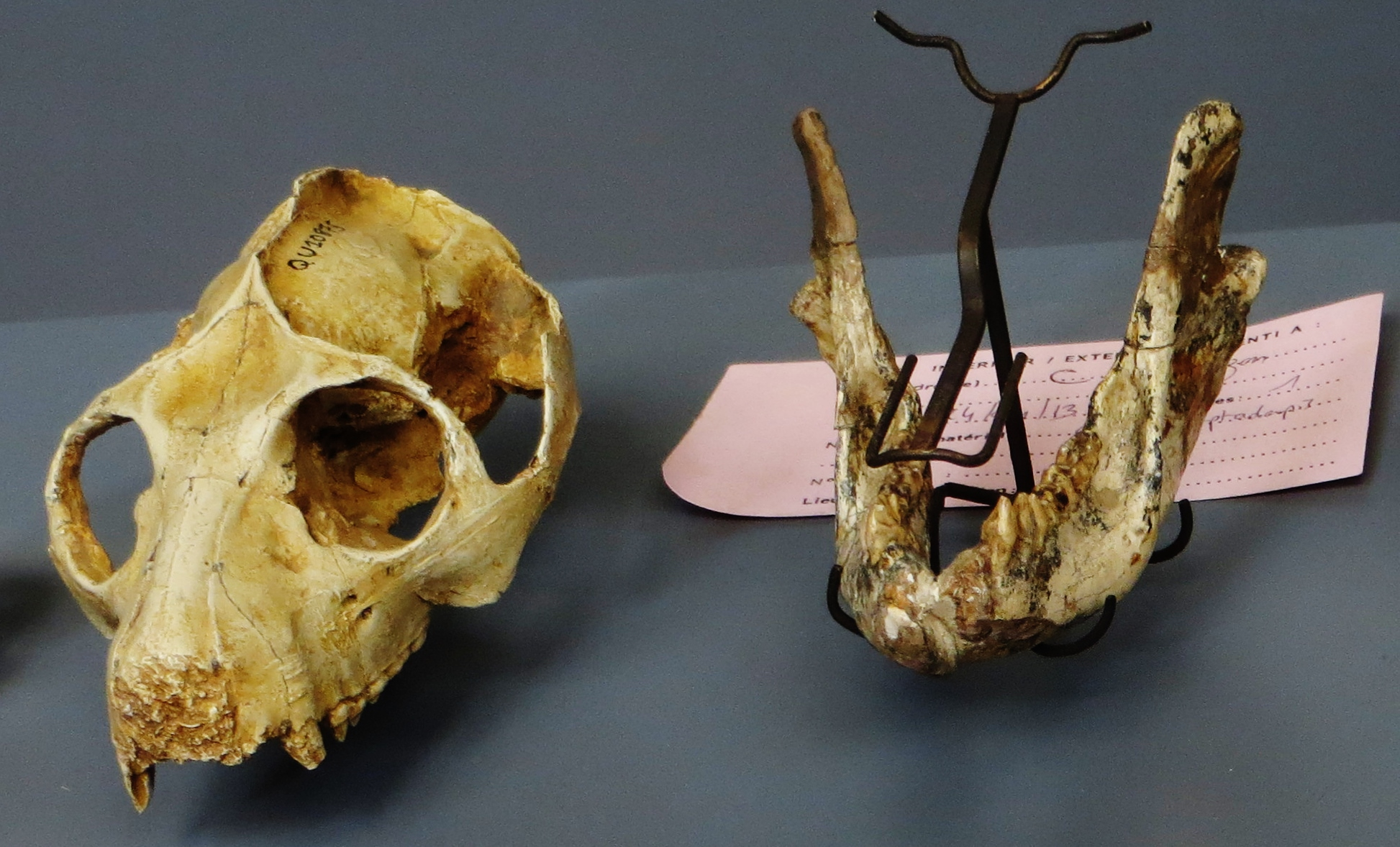
- L. magnus

Scientific classification
- Kingdom: Animalia
- Phylum: Chordata
- Class: Mammalia
- Order: Primates
- Suborder: Strepsirrhini
- Family: †Adapidae
- Subfamily: †Adapinae
- Genus: †Leptadapis; Gervais, 1876

Species
- †L. assolicus; †L. filholi Godinot & Couette, 2008; †L. capellae Crusafont-Pairo, 1967; †L. leenhardti Stehlin, 1912; †L. magnus Filhol, 1874; †L. ruetimeyeri Stehlin, 1912

Synonyms
- Paradapis Tattersall & Schwartz, 1983

= Leptadapis =

Leptadapis Temporal range: Middle Eocene ~40–37 Ma

Extinct genus of primates

Leptadapis is an extinct genus of adapiform primate that lived in Europe during the middle Eocene. Fossils of the genus have been found in the Escanilla Formation of Spain, at the sites of La Bouffie and Perrière in France, and at Egerkingen in Switzerland.

== Palaeobiology ==
=== Palaeoecology ===
Dental microwear of Leptadapis magnus from La Bouffie, a closed canopy tropical rainforest, shows that its dietary habit was a mixture of folivory and frugivory. In the more open woodland of Perrière, however, L. magnus strictly fed on leaves.

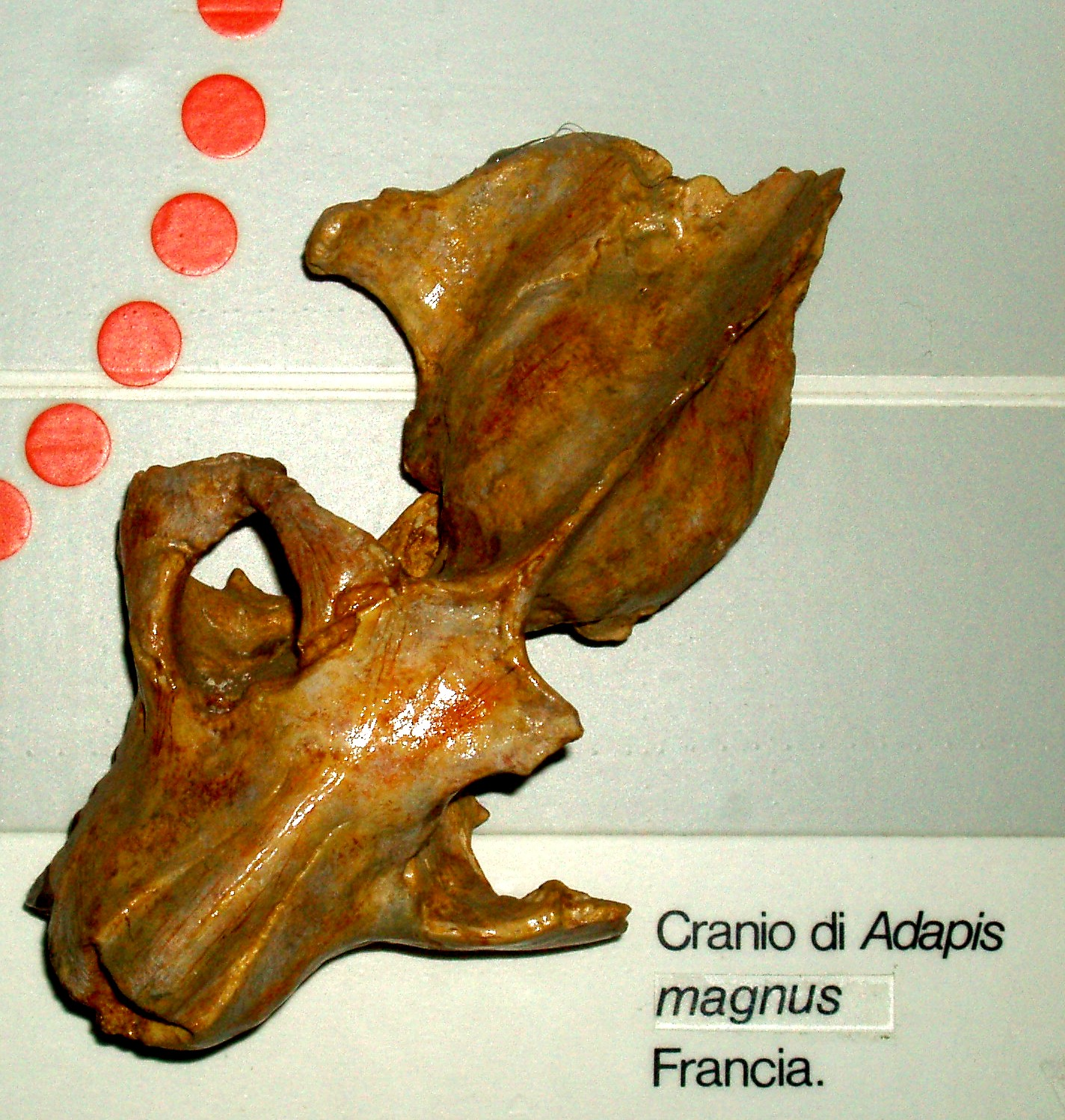
L. magnus skull
