= Caenopithecinae =

Caenopithecinae Temporal range: Eocene

Scientific classification
- Kingdom: Animalia
- Phylum: Chordata
- Class: Mammalia
- Order: Primates
- Suborder: Strepsirrhini
- Family: †Adapidae
- Subfamily: †Caenopithecinae; Szalay & Delson 1979

Genera
- †Adapoides; †Afradapis; †Aframonius; †Caenopithecus; †Darwinius; †Europolemur; †Mahgarita; †Masradapis; †Mescalerolemur

Extinct subfamily of primates

Caenopithecinae is a subfamily within the extinct primate family Adapidae, found in Europe and northern Africa from the Eocene to the Oligocene.
