= Palaeolemur =

Palaeolemur Temporal range: Late Eocene

Scientific classification
- Domain: Eukaryota
- Kingdom: Animalia
- Phylum: Chordata
- Class: Mammalia
- Order: Primates
- Suborder: Strepsirrhini
- Family: †Adapidae
- Genus: †Palaeolemur; Delfortrie, 1873
- Species: †P. betillei

Binomial name
- †Palaeolemur betillei Delfortrie, 1873

Extinct genus of primates

Palaeolemur is a genus of adapiform primate that lived in Europe during the late Eocene.
