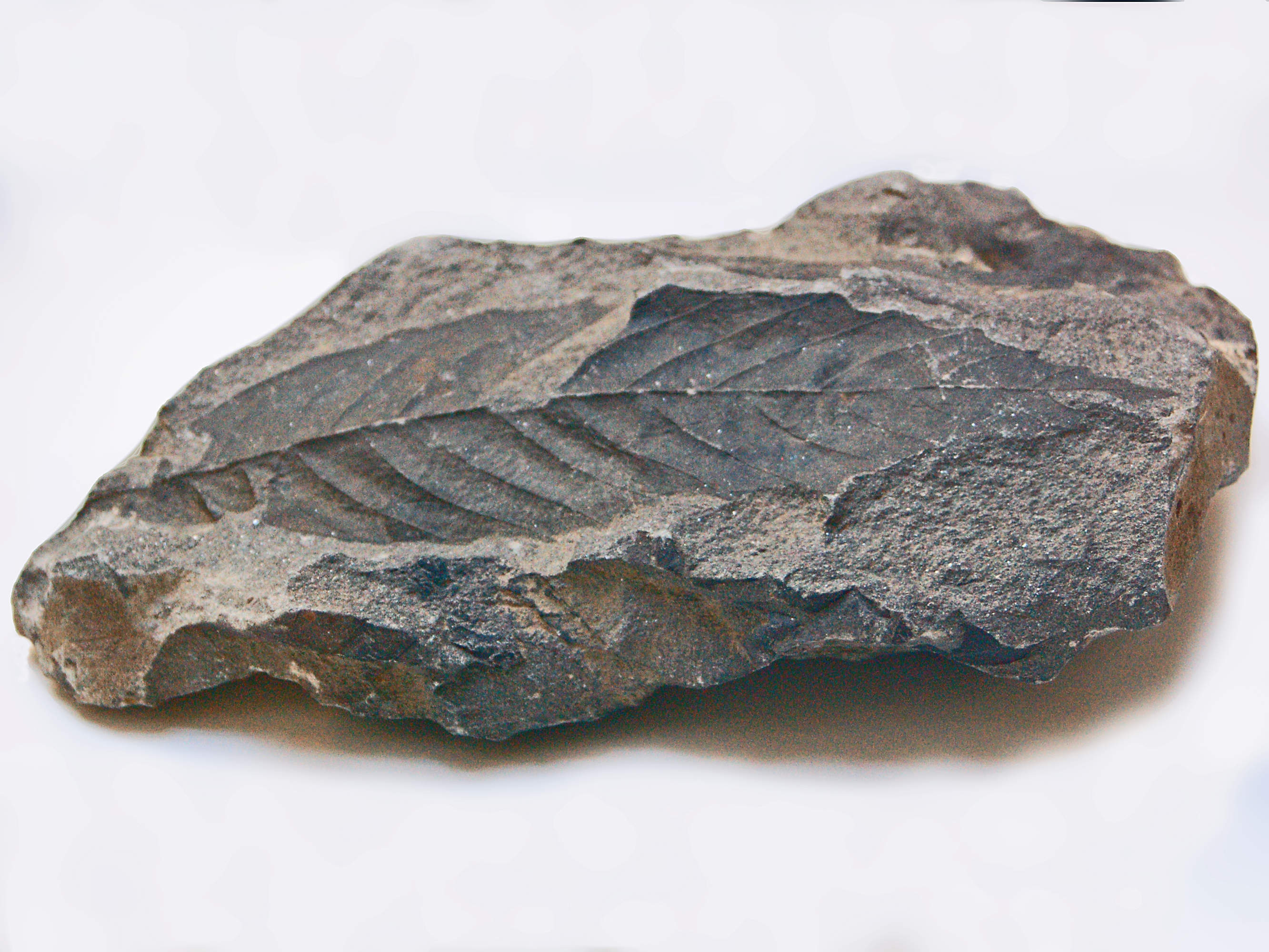
- Fossil leaf of Eotrigonobalanus furcinervis

Scientific classification
- Kingdom: Plantae
- (unranked): Angiosperms
- (unranked): Eudicots
- (unranked): Rosids
- Order: Fagales
- Family: Fagaceae
- Genus: Eotrigonobalanus H.Walther & Z.Kvacek

= Eotrigonobalanus =

Genus of deciduous trees

Eotrigonobalanus is an extinct genus of deciduous trees in the family Fagaceae. This genus is known in the fossil record from the Late Eocene to the Latest Oligocene.

== Bibliography ==
- Roth-Nebelsick, Anita; Grein, Michaela; Utescher, Torsten; Konrad, Wilfried (2012), "Stomatal pore length change in leaves of Eotrigonobalanus furcinervis (Fagaceae) from the Late Eocene to the Latest Oligocene and its impact on gas exchange and CO2 reconstruction", Review of Palaeobotany and Palynology, 174: 106–112, doi:10.1016/j.revpalbo.2012.01.001
- Velitzelos, E.; Kvaček, Z.; Walther, H. (2008), "Erster Nachweis von Eotrigonobalanus furcinervis (ROSSM.) WALTHER & KVAČEK (Fagaceae) in Griechenland", Feddes Repertorium, 110 (5–6): 349–358, doi:10.1002/fedr.19991100506
- Grímsson, Friðgeir; Zetter, Reinhard; Grimm, Guido W.; Pedersen, Gunver Krarup; Pedersen, Asger Ken; Denk, Thomas (2015), "Fagaceae pollen from the early Cenozoic of West Greenland: Revisiting Engler's and Chaney's Arcto-Tertiary hypotheses", Plant Systematics and Evolution, 301 (2): 809–832, Bibcode:2015PSyEv.301..809G, doi:10.1007/s00606-014-1118-5, PMC 4299674, PMID 25620836
