= Microadapis =

Microadapis Temporal range: Middle Eocene

Scientific classification
- Domain: Eukaryota
- Kingdom: Animalia
- Phylum: Chordata
- Class: Mammalia
- Order: Primates
- Suborder: Strepsirrhini
- Family: †Adapidae
- Subfamily: †Adapinae
- Genus: †Microadapis; Szalay, 1974

Type species
- †Microadapis sciureus Stehlin, 1916

Species
- †M. lynnae; †M. sciureus Stehlin, 1916

Extinct genus of primates

Microadapis is a genus of adapiform primate that lived in Europe during the middle Eocene.
