= Robert D. Martin =

British-born biological anthropologist (born 1942)

Robert D. Martin PhD
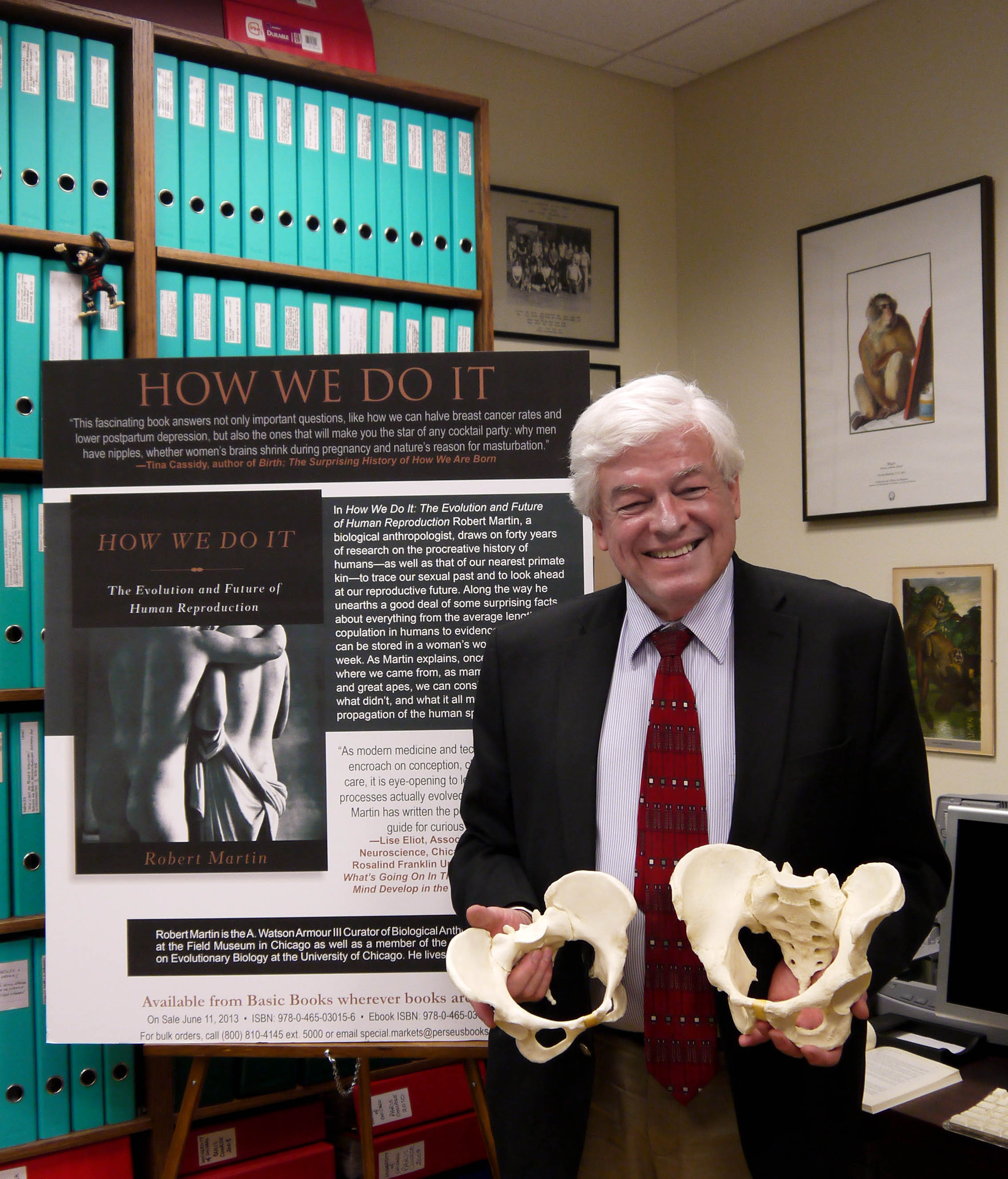
- Martin in his office at The Field Museum holding human pelvises
- Born: 1942 (age 83–84); England, United Kingdom
- Education: University of Oxford (PhD; 1967)
- Organization: The Field Museum
- Website: www.fieldmuseum.org

Robert D. Martin (born 1942) is a British-born biological anthropologist who is currently an emeritus Curator at The Field Museum of Natural History in Chicago, Illinois. He is also an adjunct professor at University of Chicago, Northwestern University, and University of Illinois Chicago. His research spans the fields of anthropology, evolutionary biology and human reproductive biology. Additionally, he writes a blog on human reproduction for Psychology Today.

== Early life and education ==
Martin was born in 1942 in the United Kingdom, where he also grew up. He studied zoology at Worcester College at University of Oxford and also earned his PhD from there in 1967. His PhD project (1964–67) on the behavior and evolution of treeshrews (Tupaiidae) was based on research with Konrad Lorenz and Irenäus Eibl-Eibesfeldt (Max-Planck-Institut, Seewiesen), supervised by Nikolaas Tinbergen (University of Oxford). Treeshrews were, at the time, widely thought to be the most primitive living primates. Through his study on their maternal behavior and later through studies of their brains, he concluded in his PhD thesis that treeshrews are not close relatives of primates.

== Career ==
Immediately after his PhD, Martin received a NATO postdoctoral grant (1967–69) to work with J.J. Petter and A. Petter-Rousseaux (Museum National d'Histoire Naturelle, Brunoy) to study the reproductive biology of mouse lemurs while continuing his work on primate morphology. Afterwards, he received a lecturer position in biological anthropology at University College London (1969–74), where he continued his research on the reproduction of mouse lemurs and comparative work on morphology of the skull, brain, postcranial skeleton and reproductive system in primates. In 1974, Martin became a senior research fellow at the Wellcome Laboratories at the Zoological Society of London, where he coordinated research on mammalian reproduction. In 1975, he spent a semester at Yale University as visiting professor in the Department of Anthropology. Martin then returned to University College London, first as reader (1978–82) and then as professor (1982–86) in biological anthropology, during which his research became focused on allometric scaling, particularly regarding the brain. In 1986, he became the director and professor of the Anthropological Institute at the University of Zurich in Switzerland, where he started a range of research activities. In 2001, Martin accepted an appointment at The Field Museum, first as vice president and then as provost for Academic Affairs while holding the position as curator in the Department of Anthropology. In 2006, he stepped down from his administrative role and became the A. Watson Armour III Curator of Biology Anthropology. He became emeritus curator at the end of 2013.

== Research ==
Martin's research uses a wide range of approaches to identify reliable general principles in human evolution. In order to interpret human origins, he has conducted comprehensive comparisons across primates with studies that cover anatomy of both living and fossil representatives, ecology, behaviour, reproduction and molecular evolution. Throughout his research, the study of size relationships (allometric scaling or allometry) has been a prevalent theme. His synthetic approach to primate evolution has revealed a number of important relationships. This was exemplified in a study by Martin and colleagues on times of divergence in the primate tree, notably the split between humans and chimpanzees. Because of major gaps in the fossil record, estimation of divergence times from earliest known fossil relatives can be misleading. So they used statistical analyses of living and fossil primates in combination with an evolutionary tree based on DNA evidence, which revealed that divergence times within the primate tree are generally substantially earlier than has often been claimed. Specifically, the divergence between humans and chimpanzees — which was to be around 5 million years ago — appears to be closer to 8 million years ago. Another example is provided by the connection between brain size and reproductive biology. By examining these features together, Martin and colleagues inferred that maternal energy resources played a vital part in the evolution of the brain. The resulting "Maternal Energy Hypothesis" is particularly relevant to interpreting the evolution of the very large brain of humans.

Martin has over 300 publications, including peer-reviewed papers, books, book chapters, and book translations. Two major book publications include Primate Origins and Evolution (1990) and How We Do It: The Evolution and Future of Human Reproduction (2013). Additionally, he has translated numerous publications from both French and German to English. As a curator, he has also overseen a number of exhibits at The Field Museum, including Images of the Afterlife and "Scenes from the Stone Age: The Cave Paintings of Lascaux.

== Awards and recognition ==
- Thomas Henry Huxley Award from the Zoological Society of London in 1968 for Ph.D. thesis completed in 1967.
- Invited to give the 52nd James Arthur Lecture in 1982 on the Evolution of the Human Brain, American Museum of Natural History, New York.
- Invited to give the 11th Curl Lecture in Anthropology in 1983 by the Royal Anthropological Institute (London).
- Invited to give the Osman Hill Memorial Lecture in Primatology (with Memorial Medal) in 1990 by the Primate Society (Great Britain)..
- Award for Excellence in the category "Best Specialist Reference Work 1992" awarded in 1993 by the Literati Club (UK) for The Cambridge Encyclopedia of Human Evolution (shared with S.Bunney, J.S.Jones, and D.R.Pilbeam).
- D.Sc. degree awarded by the University of Oxford in 1995.
- Invited to give the Ernst Mayr Lecture in 2003 by the Berlin-Brandenburgische Akademie der Wissenschaften and the Wissenschaftskolleg zu Berlin.
- Elected Fellow of the American Association for the Advancement of Science, Section on Anthropology in 2004.
- Distinguished Primatologist Award from the Midwest Primate Interest Group, USA.
