= Ludwig Ruetimeyer =

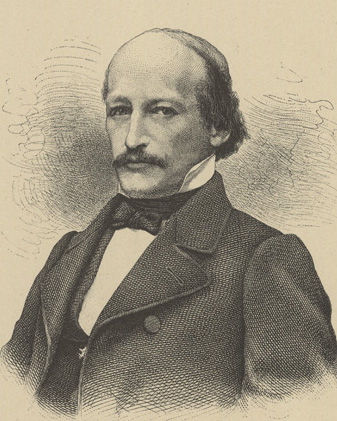
Ludwig Rütimeyer (1825-1895)

(Karl) Ludwig Rütimeyer (26 February 1825 in Biglen, Canton of Bern – 25 November 1895 in Basel) was a Swiss zoologist, anatomist and paleontologist, who is considered one of the fathers of zooarchaeology.

== Career ==
Rütimeyer studied at the University of Bern. He began his studies in theology before switching to medicine. Additional studies in Paris, London, and Leyden were in natural science. Ultimately, he got a habilitation from Bern, becoming the professor of zoology and comparative anatomy at the University of Basel. An area of specialization was the extinct fauna of Switzerland. Another area was the history of various mammalian species. His work in zooarchaeology included a report in 1861 about the remains of fish and domesticated animals from Swiss palafitte settlements.

Rütimeyer was an advocate of evolution but rejected natural selection and held anti-materialist views. In the 1860s from his studies of mammal teeth, he placed fossil mammals in some of the first evolutionary lineages. Rütimeyer wrote a supportive review of Charles Darwin's The Descent of Man and defended Darwin's ideas. However, Ernst Haeckel described Rütimeyer as a "half-Darwinist" and criticized him for his anti-materialist views. Rütimeyer was an advocate of neo-Lamarckian evolution.

In 1868, he was the first scientist to criticize Haeckel's embryo drawings, which had been used as justification for the development of recapitulation theory.

He was elected as a member to the American Philosophical Society in 1869.

== Publications ==
- Lebende und fossile Schweine, 1857
- Beiträge zur Kenntniss der fossilen Pferde, 1863 and 1878
- Die Rinder der Tertiärepoche, 1878
- Crania helvetica, 1864
- Die Grenzen der Thierwelt, 1868
- Beiträge zur Naturgeschichte der Hirschfamilie, 1882
