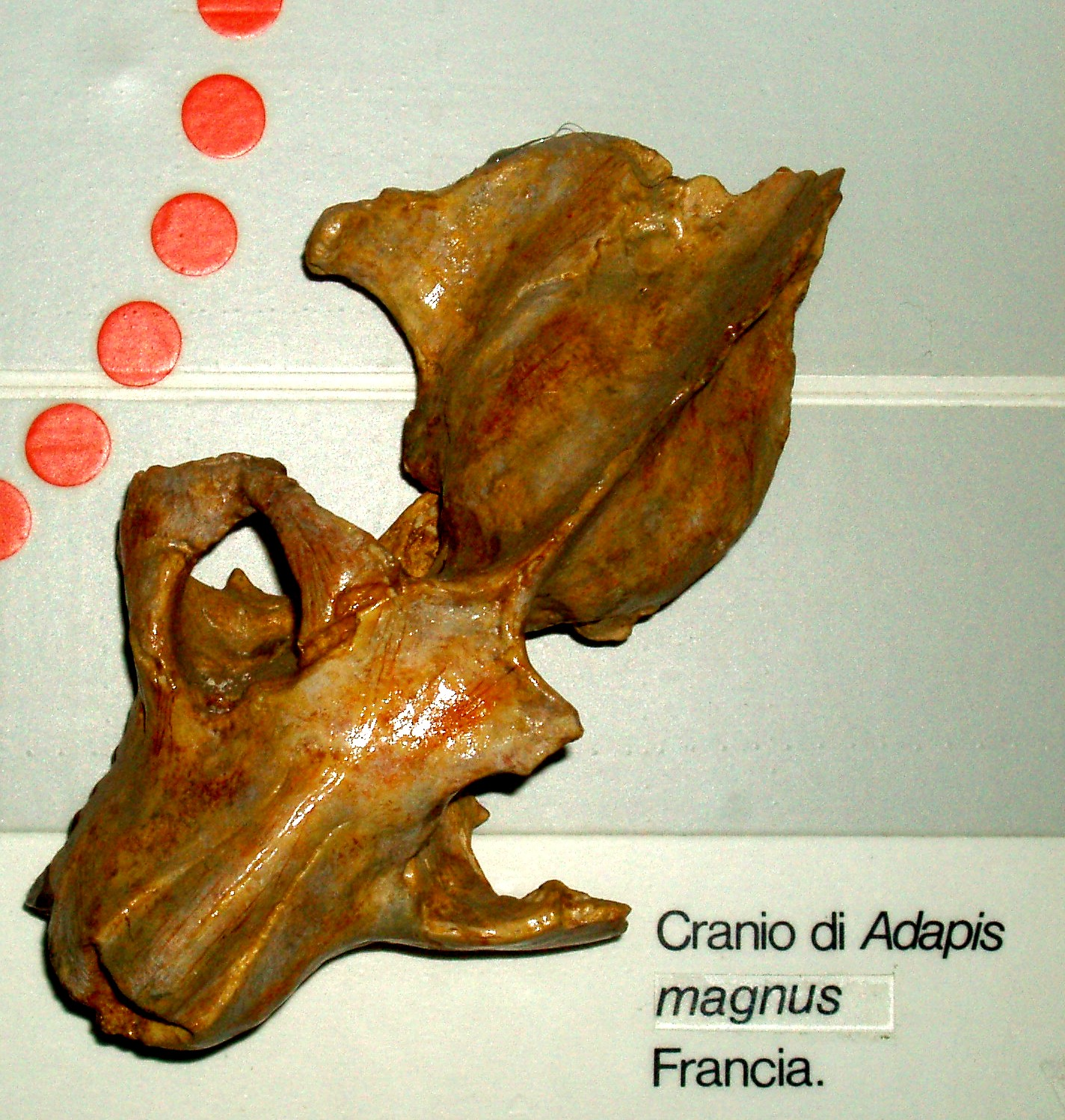
- Adapis magnus

Scientific classification
- Kingdom: Animalia
- Phylum: Chordata
- Class: Mammalia
- Infraclass: Placentalia
- Order: Primates
- Suborder: Strepsirrhini
- Superfamily: †Adapoidea
- Family: †Adapidae; Trouessart, 1879

Subfamilies
- †Adapinae; †Caenopithecinae

= Adapidae =

Adapidae Temporal range: Early - Late Eocene

Extinct family of primates

Adapidae is a family of extinct primates that primarily radiated during the Eocene epoch.

Adapid systematics and evolutionary relationships are controversial, but there is fairly good evidence from the postcranial skeleton (everything but the skull, or cranium) that adapids were stem strepsirrhines, members of the group including the living lemurs, lorises, and bushbabies. In particular, the anatomy of the adapid wrist and ankle, such as the position of the groove for the flexor fibularis tendon on the talus bone and the presence of a sloping talo-fibular facet, show derived similarities with those of living strepsirrhines.

However, adapids lacked many of the anatomical specializations characteristic of living strepsirrhines, such as a toothcomb, a toilet-claw on the second pedal digit, and a reduction in the size of the promontory branch of the internal carotid artery.

There are two major branches of adapids, the subfamilies Adapinae and Caenopithecinae. Caenopithecines are sometimes assigned to their own family, Caenopithecidae.
