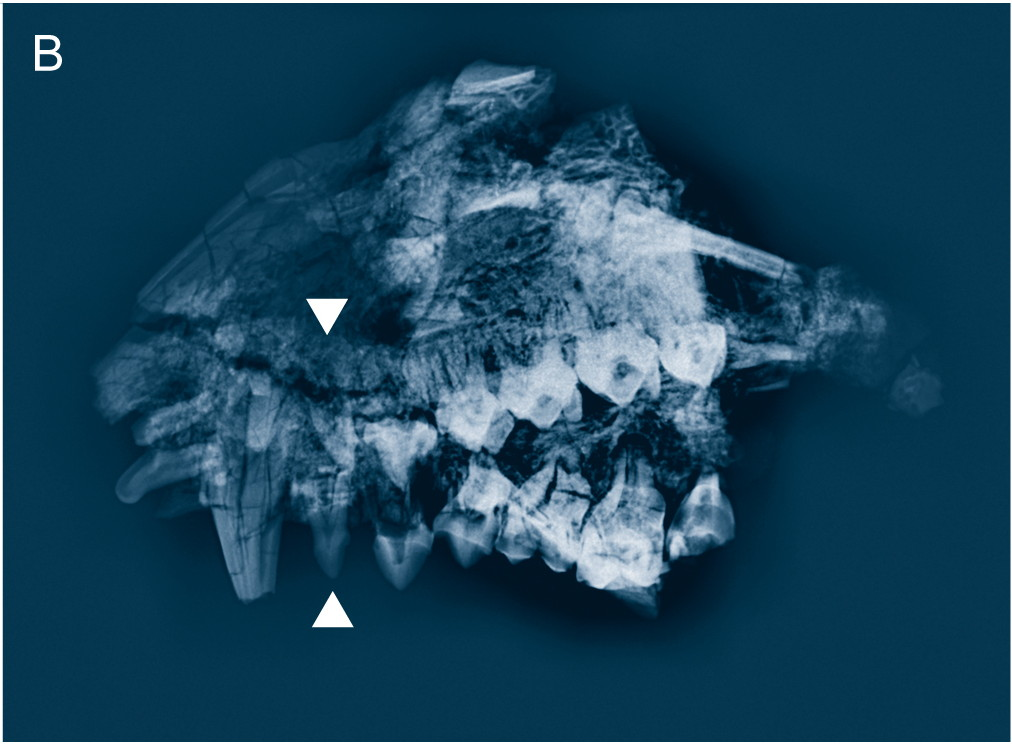
- Skull x-ray

Scientific classification
- Kingdom: Animalia
- Phylum: Chordata
- Class: Mammalia
- Infraclass: Placentalia
- Order: Primates
- Suborder: Strepsirrhini
- Family: †Adapidae
- Genus: †Europolemur
- Species: †E. klatti

Binomial name
- †Europolemur klatti Weigelt, 1933

= Europolemur klatti =

Europolemur klatti Temporal range: Eocene

Extinct species of mammal

Europolemur klatti was a medium to large size adapiformes primate that lived on the continent of Europe from the middle to early Eocene. One possible relative to this species is Margarita stevensi, whose type specimen is about the size of a white-footed sportive lemur (Lepilemur leucopus). Characteristic of most adapines are the reduced or absence of a paraconid and morphology of the paracristid. These and a few other features are synapomorphies that were used to link E. klatti with Leptadapis priscus and Microadapis sciureus, as well as Smilodectes.

== Morphology ==
Europolemur klatti is part of a group of long-digited fossils, and most likely approximates early euprimate hand proportions. E. klatti has a grasping hallux and there is evidence that supports that E. klatti may have had nails instead of claws. This insinuates that stabilizing the tips of the digits and hand must have in some way been an important function for them and their lifestyle in their habitat. Relative to the forearm, the hand of E. klatti was large which may be related to vertical climbing or posture. The shape of the calcaneus (heel) resembles that found in Smilodectes and Notharctus. E. klatti had an average body mass of 1.7 kilograms.

== Dentition ==
In 1995, two isolated upper molars belonging to E. klatti were found in an old lake deposit during excavations by the Natural History Museum of Mainz (Naturhistorisches Museum Mainz/Landessammlung fur Naturkunde Rheinland-Pfalz). The museum determined that the molars — as well as a mandible with nearly complete dentition belonging to another cercamoniine, Periconodon — were representative of the first primates from the Middle Eocene Eckfeld maar in Southwest Eifel, Germany. E. klatti has a dental formula of 2:1:3:3 and the milk dentition of this species consisted of four premolars while the adults only had three premolars.
