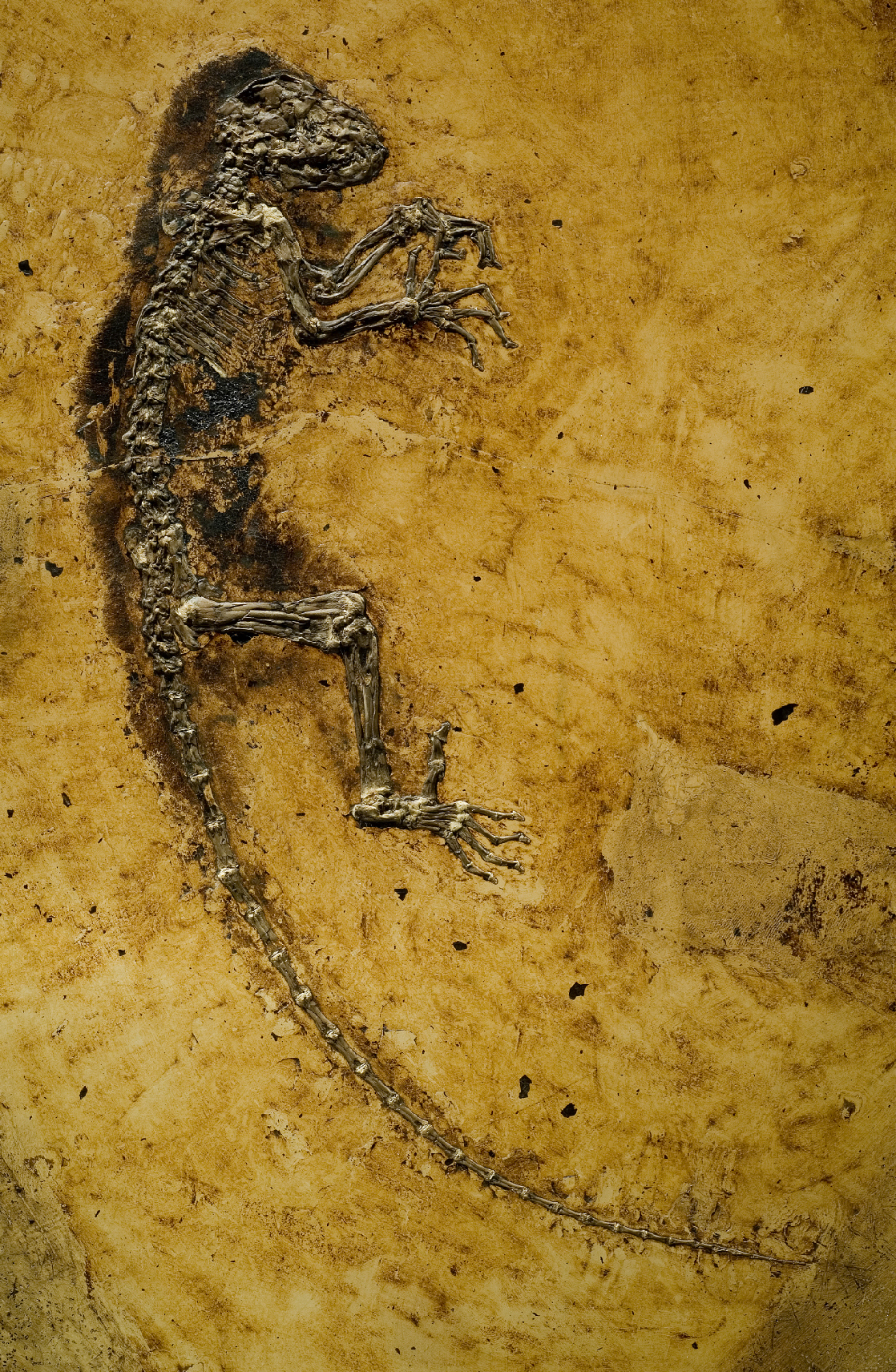
- Main slab of the Darwinius masillae holotype fossil (specimen PMO 214.214)

Scientific classification
- Kingdom: Animalia
- Phylum: Chordata
- Class: Mammalia
- Infraclass: Placentalia
- Order: Primates
- Suborder: Strepsirrhini
- Family: †Adapidae
- Genus: †Darwinius; Franzen et al., 2009
- Species: †D. masillae

Binomial name
- †Darwinius masillae Franzen et al., 2009

= Darwinius =

Darwinius Temporal range: Middle Eocene, 47 Ma

Extinct genus of primates

Darwinius is a genus within the infraorder Adapiformes, a group of basal strepsirrhine primates from the middle Eocene epoch. Its only known species, Darwinius masillae, lived approximately 47 million years ago (Lutetian stage) based on dating of the fossil site.

The only known fossil, called Ida, was discovered in 1983 at the Messel pit, a disused quarry near the village of Messel, about 35 km (22 mi) southeast of Frankfurt, Germany. The fossil, divided into a slab and partial counterslab after the amateur excavation and sold separately, was not reassembled until 2007. The fossil is of a juvenile female, approximately 58 cm (23 in) overall length, with the head and body length excluding the tail being about 24 cm (9.4 in). It is estimated that Ida died at about 80–85% of her projected adult body and limb length.

The genus Darwinius was named in commemoration of the bicentenary of the birth of Charles Darwin, and the species name masillae honors Messel where the specimen was found. The creature appeared superficially similar to a modern lemur.

The authors of the paper describing Darwinius classified it as a member of the primate family Notharctidae, subfamily Cercamoniinae, suggesting that it has the status of a significant transitional form (a "link") between the prosimian and simian ("anthropoid") primate lineages. Others have disagreed with this placement.

Concerns have been raised about the claims made about the fossil's relative importance and the publicising of the fossil before adequate information was available for scrutiny by the academic community. Some of Norway's leading biologists, among them Nils Christian Stenseth, have called the fossil an "exaggerated hoax" and stated that its presentation and popular dissemination "fundamentally violate scientific principles and ethics."

== Taxonomy ==
Franzen et al. (2009) place the genus Darwinius in the subfamily Cercamoniinae of the family Notharctidae within the extinct infraorder Adapiformes of early primates.

Darwinius masillae is the third primate species to be discovered at the Messel locality that belongs to the cercamoniine adapiforms, in addition to Europolemur koenigswaldi and Europolemur kelleri. Darwinius masillae is similar but not directly related to Godinotia neglecta from Geiseltal. The partially-fabricated counterslab of Darwinius was originally interpreted as a specimen of Godinotia neglecta, before being united with the main slab.

The adapiforms are early primates which are known only from the fossil record, and it is unclear whether they form a monophyletic or a paraphyletic grouping. They are usually grouped under Strepsirrhini—including lemurs, aye-ayes and lorisoids—and as such would not be ancestral to Haplorrhini, which includes tarsiers and simians. Simians are usually called "anthropoid": while this term can be confusing, the paper uses it, as does associated publicity material. Simians (anthropoids) include monkeys and apes, which in turn includes humans.

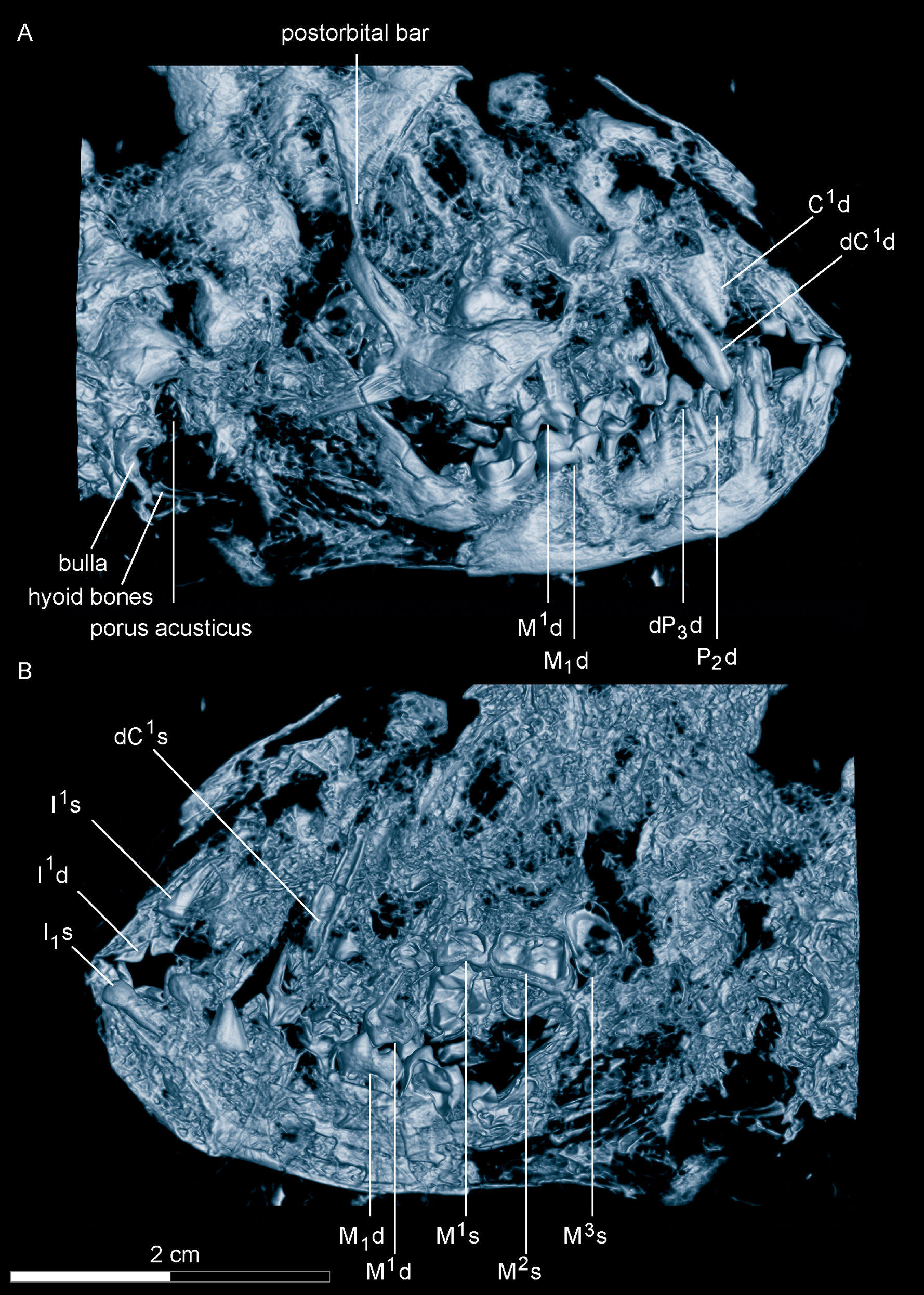
CT image of the skull of Darwinius.

Franzen et al. in their 2009 paper place Darwinius in the "Adapoidea group of early primates representative of early haplorhine diversification". This means that, according to these authors, the adapiforms would not be entirely within the Strepsirrhini lineage as hitherto assumed, but would qualify as a transitional fossil (a "missing link") between Strepsirrhini and Haplorrhini, and so could be ancestral to humans. They also suggest that tarsiers have been misplaced in the Haplorrhini and should be considered Strepsirrhini. To support this view they show that as many as six morphological traits found in "Darwinius" are derived characters present only in the Haplorrhini lineage, but absent in the Strepsirrhini lineage, which they interpret as synapomorphies. These include, among others, a cranium with a short rostrum, deep mandibular ramus, loss of all grooming claws. They note "that Darwinius masillae and adapoids contemporary with early tarsioids could represent a stem group from which later anthropoid primates evolved, but we are not advocating this here, nor do we consider either Darwinius or adapoids to be anthropoids."

=== Concerns over cladistic analysis ===
Paleontologists have expressed concern that the cladistic analysis compared only 30 traits when standard practice is to analyze 200 to 400 traits and to include fossils such as anthropoids from Egypt and the primate genus Eosimias which were not included in the analysis. This contrasts with the motive openly stated by the authors, which was to list 30 anatomical and morphological characteristics "commonly used" to distinguish extant strepsirrhine and haplorrhine primates. Paleontologist Richard Kay of Duke University thought the data could have been cherry-picked. Paleontologist Callum Ross of the University of Chicago considered the claim that Darwinius should be classified as haplorhine was "unsupportable in light of modern methods of classification." The opinion of Chris Beard, curator of vertebrate paleontology at the Carnegie Museum of Natural History, was that Darwinius was not a "missing link" between anthropoids and more primitive primates, but that further study of this remarkably complete specimen would be very informative and could reveal relationships amongst "the earliest and least human-like of all known primates, the Eocene adapiforms." In an interview published on 27 May 2009, Jørn Hurum stated that he had an open mind about the possibility that the fossil might turn out to be a lemur and that a paper on systematics to be published within about a year would mainly focus on the partial counterslab containing the inner ear and the foot bones.

Most experts hold that the higher primates (simians) evolved from Tarsiidae, branching off the Strepsirrhini before the appearance of the Adapiformes. A smaller group agrees with Franzen et al. that the higher primates descend from Adapiformes (Adapoidea). The view of paleontologist Tim White is that Darwinius is unlikely to end the argument.

Philip D. Gingerich states that the seven superfamilies of primates are commonly associated in the higher taxonomic groupings of suborders Anthropoidea and Prosimii as an alternative to Haplorhini and Strepsirrhini, depending on the position of Adapoidea and Tarsioidea. He puts forward a phylogeny in which the higher primates evolved from Darwinius, which he groups with other Adapoidea. He shows the Adapoidea together with the Tarsioidea as representing early diversification of the suborder Haplorhini and shows the Strepsirrhini as having branched off directly from the earliest primates. The Revealing the Link website uses this taxonomic grouping and states that Darwinius is from an early group of primates just prior to diversification into the anthropoids (monkeys, apes and humans) and the prosimians (lemurs, lorises and tarsiers).

Erik Seiffert and colleagues at Stony Brook University argue that Darwinius is on the branch towards the Strepsirrhini and is not a 'missing link' in the evolution of the Anthropoidea. A phylogenetic analysis of 360 morphological characters in 117 extinct and modern primates places Darwinius in a now-extinct group of strepsirrhines along with a newly discovered 37-million-year-old Egyptian primate, Afradapis. Seiffert believes that characteristics that appeared to show a relationship to haplorrhines are due to convergent evolution and has said that "the PR hype surrounding the Darwinius description was very confusing."

== Type specimen ==
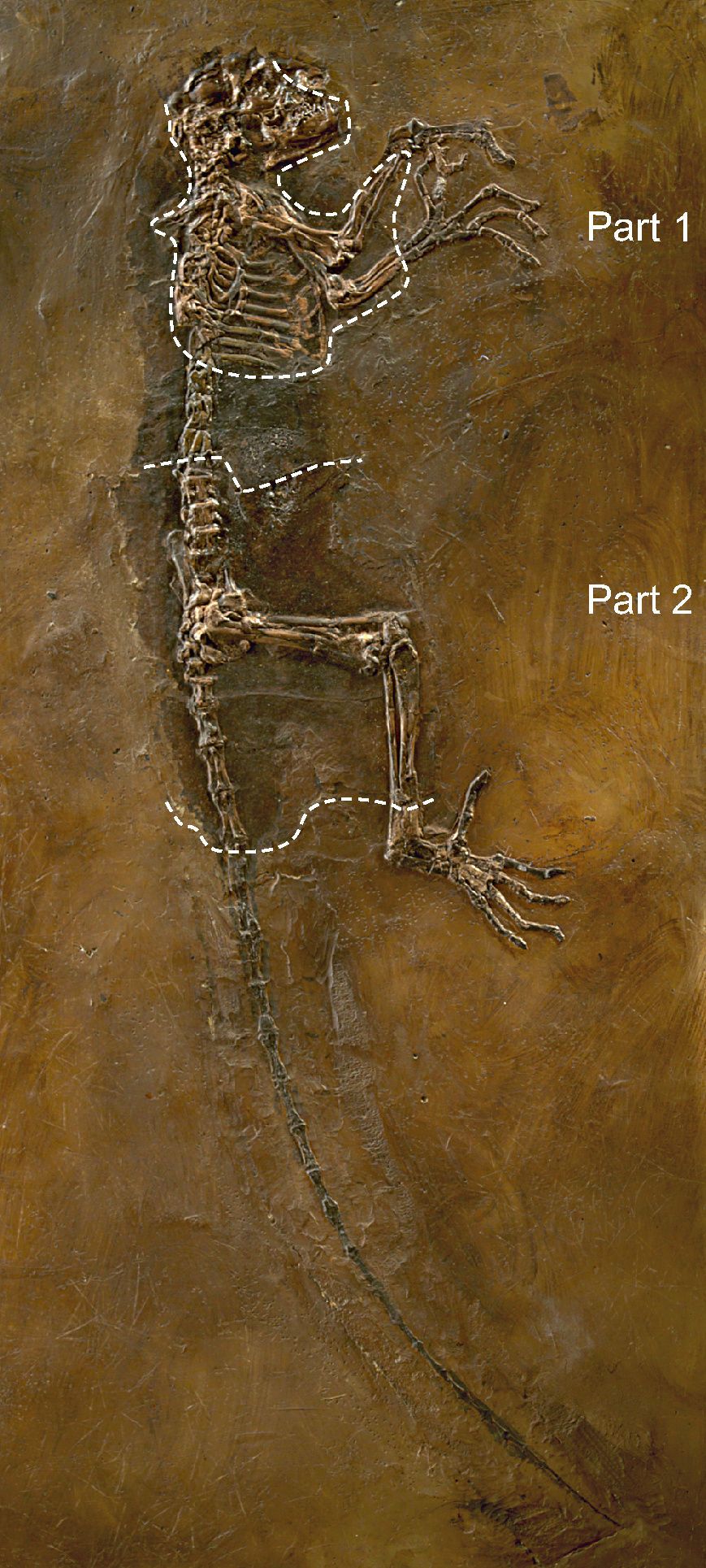
Counter-slab of the Darwinius masillae holotype fossil (specimen WDC-MG-210 reversed for comparison). Parts 1 and 2 (enclosed in dashed lines) are genuine; remainder of plate B was fabricated during preparation

The type specimen is missing only its left rear leg. It has been named Ida after the daughter of Jørn Hurum, the Norwegian vertebrate paleontologist from the Natural History Museum, University of Oslo, who secured one section of the fossil from an anonymous owner and led the research. In addition to the bones, remains of Ida's soft tissue and fur outline are present along with remnants of her last meal of fruit and leaves. The animal is about 58 cm (23 in) from nose to tail, or roughly the size of a small, long-tailed cat.

The lemur-like skeleton of the fossil features primate characteristics of grasping hands with opposable thumbs and nails instead of claws. These would have provided a "precision grip" which, for Ida, was useful for climbing and gathering fruit. Ida also has flexible arms and relatively short limbs. The fossil is missing two anatomical features found in modern lemurs: a grooming claw on the foot and a fused row of teeth, a toothcomb, in the bottom jaw.

Digital reconstructions of Ida's teeth reveal that she has unerupted molars in her jaw, indicating by comparison with modern squirrel monkeys that she was 9–10 months old and would have weighed 485 grams (17.1 oz); it was also initially suggested that Darwininus reached adulthood at 36 months with a body mass of 650–900 grams (23–32 oz), and that it likely had a maximum age of 20 years. Both the age of Ida's death and the possible adult body mass has been questioned by López-Torres and colleagues in 2015, who suggested that Ida would have died between 1.05 and 1.14 years (12 to 14 months) of age based on its dental erruptions resembling more of strepsirrhines, and that an adult Darwinius would have weighed between 622–642 grams (21.9–22.6 oz) based on the growth model of lemurids. The shape of Ida's teeth provides clues as to her diet; jagged molars would have allowed her to slice food, suggesting that she was a leaf and seed eater. This is confirmed by the remarkable preservation of her gut content. Furthermore, the lack of a baculum (penis bone) found in all lower primates means that the fossil was from a female. X-rays performed on Ida revealed that her right wrist was healing from a fracture which may have contributed to her death. The scientists speculate whether she was overcome by carbon dioxide fumes while drinking from the Messel lake. Hampered by her broken wrist, she slipped into unconsciousness, was washed into the lake and sank to the bottom, where unique fossilisation conditions preserved her for 47 million years.

=== Palaeopathology ===
The type specimen of D. masillae exhibits a wrist injury. Based on studies of ring-tailed lemurs, it is unlikely that this injury was fatal, as ring-tailed lemurs have been shown to survive and maintain their ability to climb with similar or more traumatic injuries.

== Discovery and acquisition ==
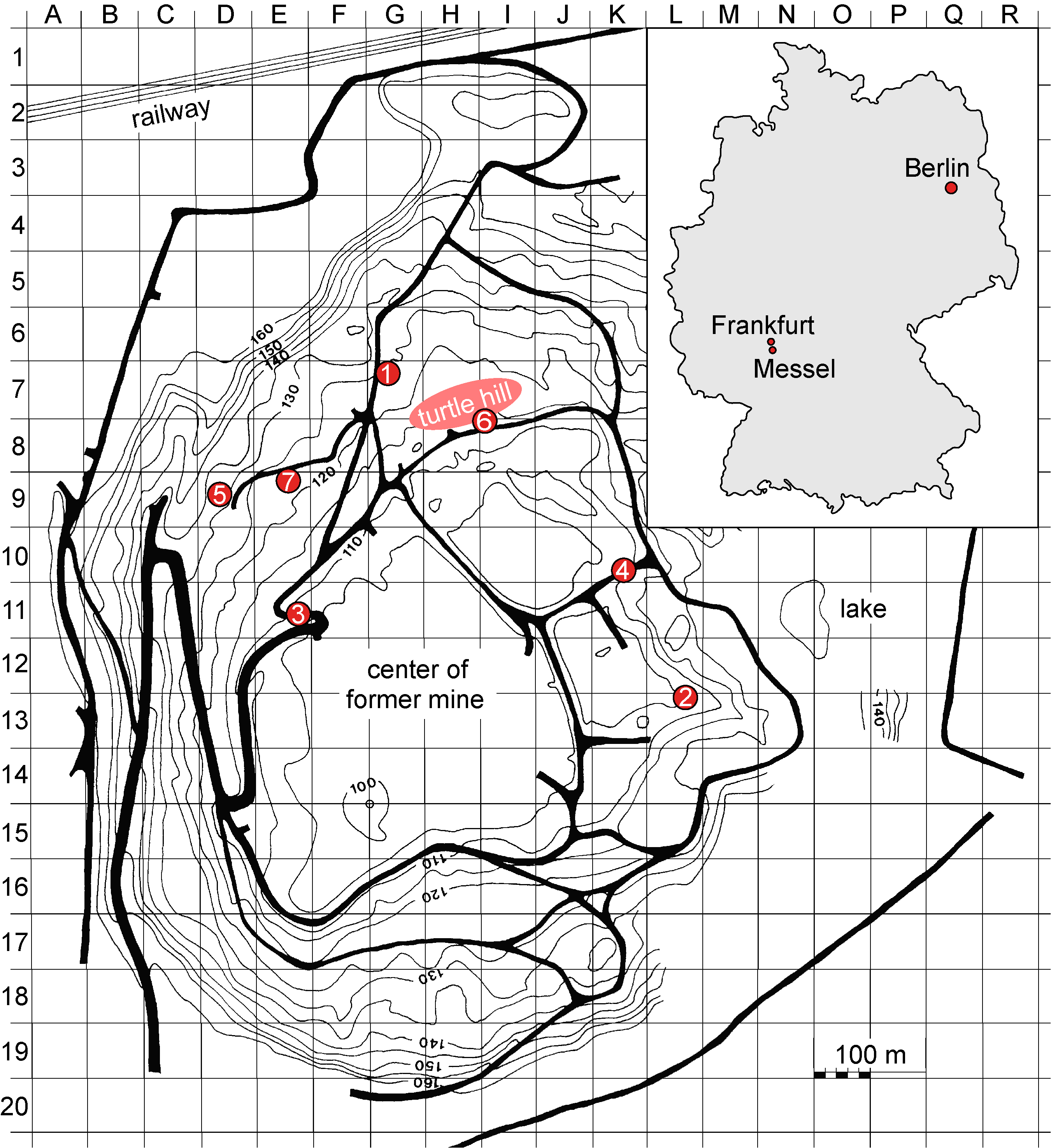
Map showing where Darwinius (6) and other primates have been found in the Messel pit

The events regarding the original unearthing of the fossil are not clear, though some facts are known. It was found at the Messel pit in 1983, a disused shale quarry noted for its astonishing fossil preservation, near the village of Messel about 35 km (22 mi) southeast of Frankfurt am Main in Germany. The fossil came as a slab and partial counter slab and was expertly prepared by encasing each slab in resin using the transfer technique necessary to conserve Messel fossils. At some point the slab and counter slab went separate ways. The counter slab was incorporated in a composite of fabricated parts to represent a complete specimen and arrived at the Wyoming Dinosaur Center, a private museum, in 1991. Analysis by Jens Franzen of the Natural History Museum of Basel, Switzerland revealed the mixed actual and faked nature of this slab. A comparison of the two slabs indicates that the forger had access to the whole fossil.

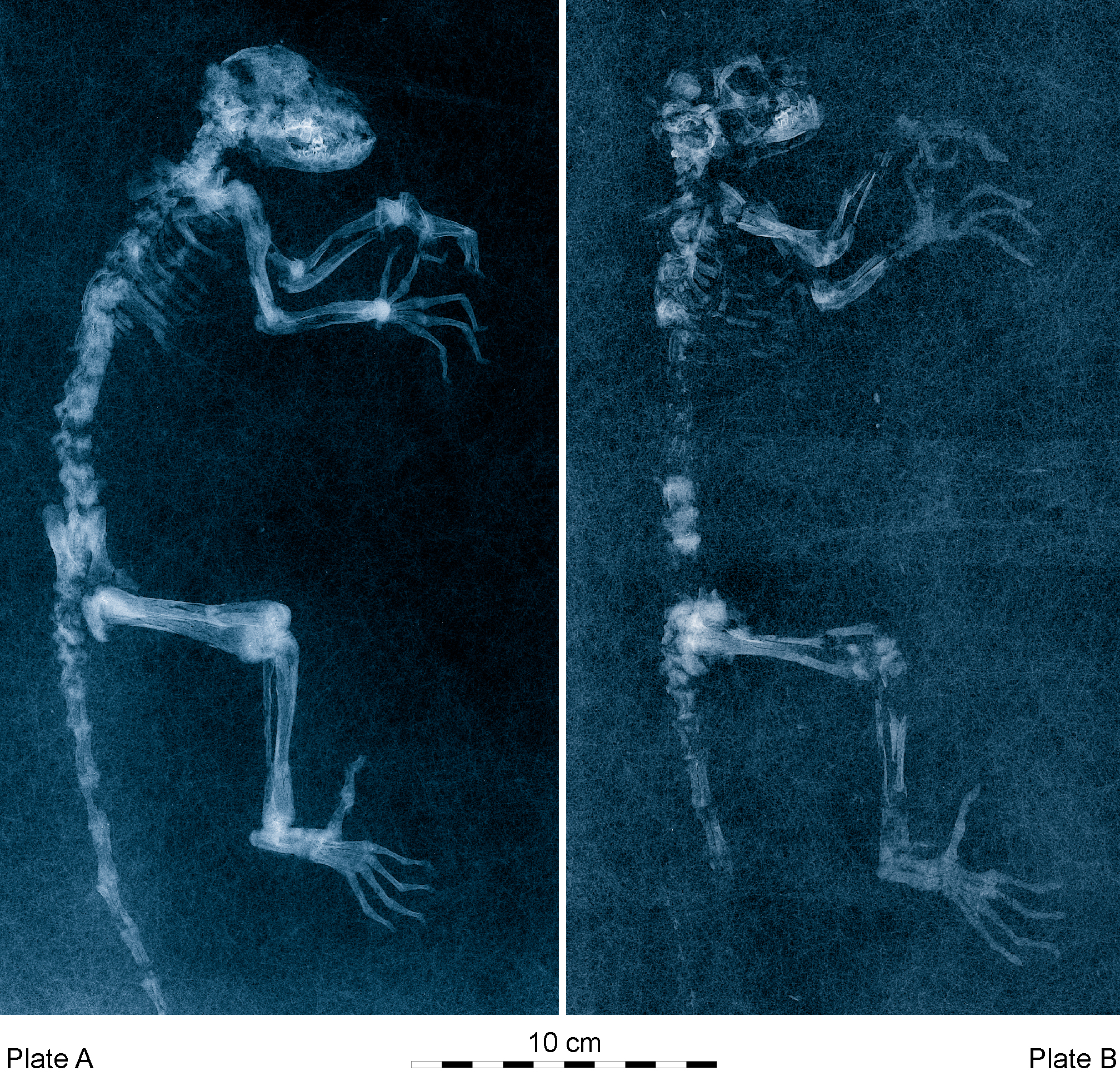
Radiographs of the Darwinius holotype fossil, revealing the fabricated parts of the counter-slab

The primary slab remained in Germany in the possession of a private collector who kept it secret for twenty years before deciding to sell it anonymously via a German fossil dealer. Two German museums turned it down as too expensive. A year later at the Hamburg Fossil and Mineral Fair in December 2006, the dealer asked Norwegian vertebrate palaeontologist Jørn Hurum, who had done some previous deals, to discuss something privately. The dealer showed Hurum three high resolution colour photographs of the fossil and told him that the asking price was $1 million. Hurum knew that it was a primate and according to Tudge's book "was fast concluding that the specimen he was looking at could be one of the holy grails of science — the 'missing link' from the crucial time period." He asked for time until after Christmas to organise funding to pay for the specimen and ensure that it had been legally collected, had an export permit and would be legitimately available for study. His first choice was the Natural History Museum of Oslo, but it was beyond their means and he began to think of other museums with sponsors available. He persuaded the Oslo museum to make half the funding available with the remainder to be paid only after X-ray scans proved conclusively that it was not a fake, a process which took several months. He put together a team including leading German experts on the Messel fossils, ensuring international ownership.

After its acquisition it was studied in secret for two years by a team of scientists led by Hurum, who was joined by primate evolution expert Professor Philip Gingerich of the University of Michigan and palaeontologists Jens Franzen, who had studied the counter slab, and Jörg Habersetzer of the Senckenberg Museum's Research Institute.

== Publication ==
While studies were in progress, negotiations were put in place for a book and with various broadcasters for documentary programs, all of whom agreed to keep the project secret. A deal went through in the summer of 2008 with The History Channel which has been reported as paying more for this than any other documentary. The team decided to publish their findings online in PLoS ONE, an open access journal of the Public Library of Science. The paper for publication was received by PLoS ONE on March 19, 2009 and accepted on May 12, 2009.

On 15 May The Wall Street Journal carried a report with interviews with Gingerich and with Tim White, who cautioned that "Lemur advocates will be delighted, but tarsier advocates will be underwhelmed". At about the same time a press release headed "World Renowned Scientists Reveal a Revolutionary Scientific Find That Will Change Everything" announced that the find was "lauded as the most significant scientific discovery of recent times."

On May 19, 2009 the team revealed their findings to the world at a press conference simultaneously with online publication of the paper in PLoS ONE (for naming purposes, the paper was officially published in print on May 21, 2009). The paper included a statement that the authors were not advocating the possibility that the species could be ancestral to later anthropoid primates; Professor John Fleagle, of Stony Brook University in New York state, asserted that he was one of the anonymous scientific reviewers of the paper and that he had explicitly requested before publication that the authors tone down their original claims that the fossil was on the human evolutionary line. At the press conference the fossil was described as the "missing link" in human evolution. Hurum said that "this fossil rewrites our understanding of the evolution of primates...it will probably be pictured in all the textbooks for the next 100 years" and compared its importance to the Mona Lisa. He also said that Darwinius was "the closest thing we can get to a direct ancestor" and that finding it was "a dream come true". Team member Jens Franzen said the state of preservation was "like the Eighth Wonder of the World", with information "palaeontologists can normally only dream of", but while he said it bore "a close resemblance to ourselves" in some aspects, other features indicated that it was not a direct ancestor.

Independent experts were quick to question the claims. Henry Gee, a senior editor at Nature, said the term "missing link" was misleading and that the scientific community would need to evaluate its significance, which was unlikely to match that of Homo floresiensis or feathered dinosaurs. Chris Beard, curator of the Carnegie Museum of Natural History, said he "would be absolutely dumbfounded if it turns out to be a potential ancestor to humans."

== Publicity and media coverage ==
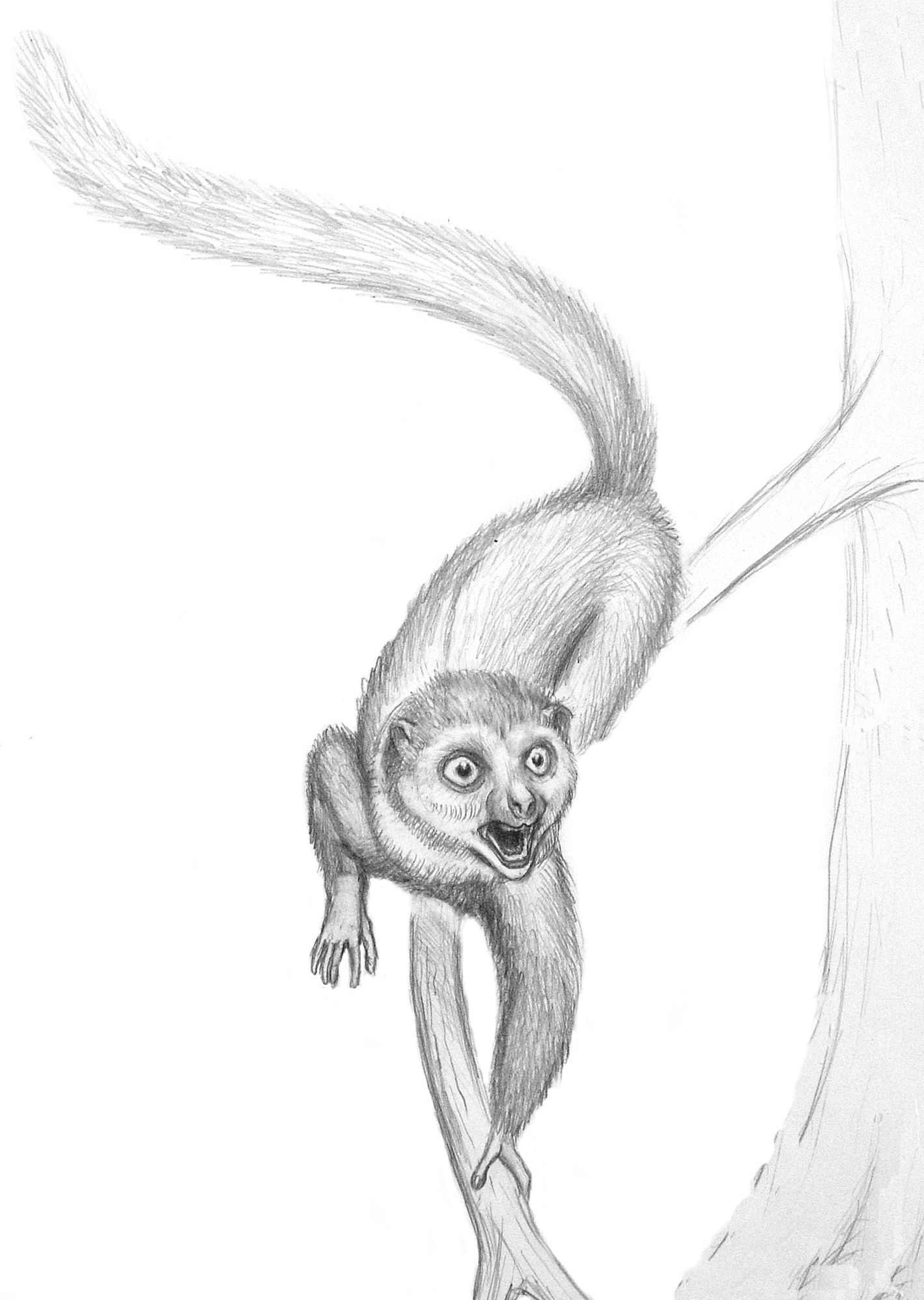
Life restoration of Darwinius

Having previously experienced how the blogosphere had picked up on his work, and seen Chinese dinosaur finds the object of bad early descriptions from blogging, Jørn Hurum decided to orchestrate launch of the fossil in a combined scientific and public event. Atlantic Productions, which had cooperated with Hurum on a program on the Predator X, a giant pliosaur from Svalbard, was brought in on the project in order to "take story straight to the masses in a way that would appeal to the average person, especially kids". The press conference and paper on the fossil was accompanied by the launch of a website the publication of a book which had already been distributed to bookstores, The Link: Uncovering Our Earliest Ancestor by Colin Tudge, and the announcement of a documentary (Uncovering Our Earliest Ancestor: The Link), made by Atlantic Productions in the UK, directed by Tim Walker and produced by Lucie Ridout, to be screened six days later on the History Channel (US), BBC One (UK), and various stations in Germany and Norway. The New York Daily News noted that "The unveiling of the fossil came as part of an orchestrated publicity campaign unusual for scientific discoveries".

One of the paper's co-authors, paleontologist Philip D. Gingerich, expressed dissatisfaction with the media campaign, telling The Wall Street Journal that they had chosen to publish in PLoS ONE as "There was a TV company involved and time pressure" and they had been pushed to finish the study. "It's not how I like to do science", Gingerich concluded. In an interview, Jørn Hurum said that PLoS ONE had been chosen as it was open access and the research had been funded by Norwegian taxpayers who would benefit from free access, it did not restrict the length of manuscript or number of illustrations, and "PLoS ONE is the quickest way to publish a large work in the world!"

At the time its discovery was announced in the scientific and the popular press, the fossil was characterized as the "most complete fossil primate ever discovered"; Sir David Attenborough has described it as "extraordinary". Google commemorated the unveiling with a themed logo on May 20, 2009. During a ceremony at the American Museum of Natural History Hurum said that "This specimen is like finding the Lost Ark for archeologists" and "It is the scientific equivalent of the Holy Grail. This fossil will probably be the one that will be pictured in all textbooks for the next 100 years." Regarding the publicity, Matt Cartmill an anthropologist from Duke University said "The P.R. campaign on this fossil is I think more of a story than the fossil itself".

Independent experts have raised concern about publicity exaggerating the importance of the find before information was available for scrutiny. Chris Beard, curator of the Carnegie Museum of Natural History, was "awestruck" by the publicity machine but concerned that if the hype was exaggerated, it could damage the popularisation of science if the creature was not all that it was hyped up to be. Paleoanthropologist Elwyn Simons of Duke University stated that it is a wonderful specimen but most of the information had been previously known, and paleoanthropologist Peter Brown of the University of New England said that the paper had insufficient evidence that Darwinius was ancestral to the simians. Others have also criticized claims that the fossil represents the "missing link in human evolution", arguing that there is no such thing unless evolution is visualized as a chain as there are an enormous number of missing branches, and that while the fossil is a primate, there is no evidence to suggest that its species is a direct ancestor of humans. ScienceBlogger Brian Switek questioned the sensationalist coverage of claims of ancestral relationships made before a full cladistic analysis, and in a column in The Times he stated that a unique opportunity to communicate science had been lost, with press releases forestalling the necessary discovery and debate which should now proceed.

Hurum considered that the risk of buying the fossil had paid off, and said that "You need an icon or two in a museum to drag people in, this is our Mona Lisa and it will be our Mona Lisa for the next 100 years." He has been described as "a modern-era, media-savvy scientist with the right amounts of showmanship, populist sensibility, and disregard for the normal avenues of scientific prestige required to pull this off". The debut in "an astonishingly slick, multi-component media package" required exceptional coordination between networks, museums, producers and scientists while maintaining a level of secrecy which is hard to attain in modern circumstances. In interviews published on 27 May, Hurum stated that it was good that they had got the message out that primates were rooted deep in time, but that some of the slogans were too much and the publicity got completely out of control. He disclosed that he paid nearly $750,000 (£465,000) for the specimen, but felt it was worthwhile to make the fossil available for scientific investigation instead of it being bought by a private collector and hidden away. Others including Chris Beard were concerned that the price and publicity could lead to profiteering by amateur collectors, and make acquisition of specimens for research purposes more difficult.

== See also ==
- List of fossil primates
- List of transitional fossils
- Geiseltal (fossil deposit)
- Notharctus
