= Buxella =

Buxella Temporal range: Middle Eocene

Scientific classification
- Domain: Eukaryota
- Kingdom: Animalia
- Phylum: Chordata
- Class: Mammalia
- Order: Primates
- Suborder: Strepsirrhini
- Family: †Notharctidae
- Subfamily: †Cercamoniinae
- Genus: †Buxella; Godinot, 1988

Type species
- †Buxella prisca Godinot, 1988

Species
- B. magna; B. prisca

Extinct genus of primates

Buxella is a genus of adapiform primate that lived in Europe during the middle Eocene.
