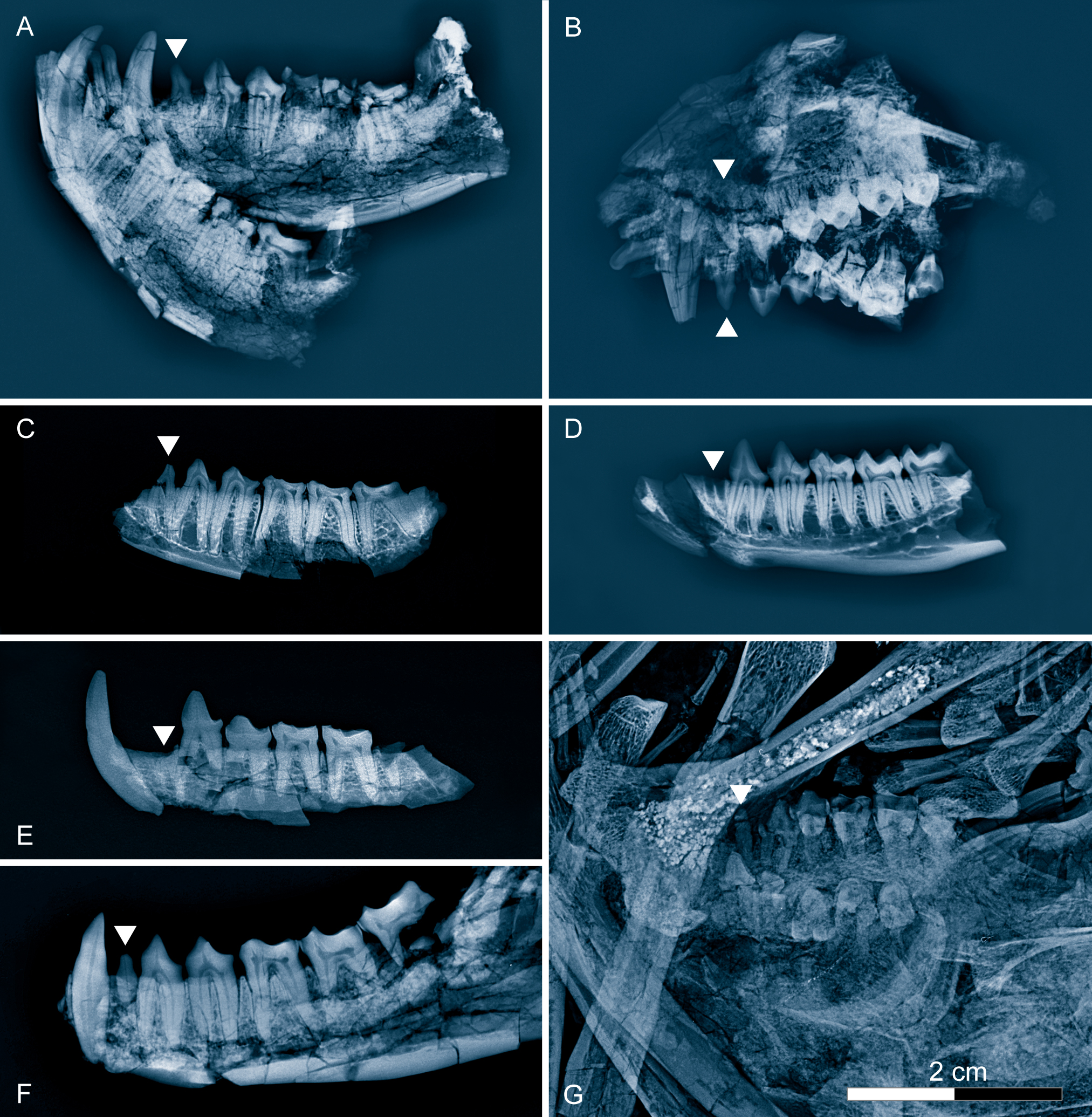
- Radiographic comparison of middle Eocene primates from Geiseltal in eastern Germany. G is part of the Godinotia neglecta holotype fossil, A-D are Europolemur, and E-F are Protoadapis.

Scientific classification
- Kingdom: Animalia
- Phylum: Chordata
- Class: Mammalia
- Order: Primates
- Suborder: Strepsirrhini
- Family: †Adapidae
- Genus: †Godinotia; Franzen, 2000
- Species: †G. neglecta

Binomial name
- †Godinotia neglecta (Thalmann et al., 1989)

Synonyms
- Pronycticebus neglectus Thalmann et al., 1989; Caenopithecus neglectus n. comb. Franz, 1994

= Godinotia =

Godinotia Temporal range: Lutetian (Middle Eocene), Mammal Paleogene zone MP 12, 46.3–44.9 Ma

Extinct genus of primates

Godinotia is an extinct genus of strepsirrhine (wet-nosed primate) from the Eocene of Germany. It belongs to the order Adapiformes, a widespread early primate group distantly related to modern lemurs. Godinotia fossils are found in Middle Eocene strata of Geiseltal. The genus contains a single species, Godinotia neglecta, which was previously regarded as a species of Pronycticebus or Caenopithecus.

In 1991, a partially forged primate skeleton from the Messel Pit, supposedly representing a fossil of Godinotia, was recovered from the fossil market. However, a 2009 study noted that this skeleton was actually a different closely-related adapiform, Darwinius masillae; specifically, being the counterpart of its holotype specimen.

== Description ==
Like Darwinius, Godinotia has a vestigial second premolar with a single root, rather than a double root like Europolemur. Its molar teeth are relatively large and have a high trigonid region, so it was probably well-adapted for eating fruit, with a large proportion of insects in its diet for added protein. A supposed Godinotia fossil from the Messel Pit preserves fruit seeds and leaf fragments as gut content, though this fossil was later recognized as Darwinius.

Compared to the Messel Pit primates, Godinotia has particularly long and slender limbs. In Godinotia, the intermediate phalanges (middle bone in each finger) are nearly as long as the proximal phalanges (inner bone in each finger). This is an unusual case more similar to plesiadapiforms than to any other primate. Like many primates, Godinotia's fingers ended at flattened nails rather than sharp claws.

The hindlimbs are significantly longer than the forelimbs, but the sacrum is unfused. As a result, Godinotia was not highly adapted for either active leaping (like some lemurs) or a slow high-grip crawl (like lorises). Instead, it probably had an intermediate approach to climbing, by grasping thin branches and vertical surfaces through all four limbs. Godinotia is estimated to have weighed around 800–850 grams (1.76–1.87 lb), similar in size to the Eastern lesser bamboo lemur.

== Discovery ==
=== Geiseltal fossils ===
A former coal mining district in Geiseltal, Germany is now regarded as one of the best sources of fossils from the Eocene epoch of central Europe. In 1989, Thalmann, Haubold, and Martin described a disarticulated but nearly complete primate skeleton from the lower middle coal of Geiseltal. This layer is from Mammal Paleogene zone MP 12. It corresponds to part of the Lutetian stage of the middle Eocene, around 45 million years old.

The fossil, GMH L-2, served as the holotype of a new primate species, which they named Pronycticebus neglectus. At the time, GMH L-2 was the most complete Eocene primate fossil ever found in Europe. According to Thalmann et al. (1989), it represented a second species of Pronycticebus, after Pronycticebus gaudryi from Quercy, France. The holotype of Pronycticebus neglectus was collected in 1969 but sat unstudied for decades, hence the species name neglectus. Thalmann et al. (1989) also referred to Pronycticebus neglectus a partial lower jaw from a slightly higher layer of the Geiseltal deposits. Thalmann discussed the primate fossils of Geiseltal more extensively in 1994.

In 2000, Jens Lorenz Franzen gave "Pronycticebus" neglectus a new genus and species combination: Godinotia neglecta. Franzen named Godinotia after French primate researcher Marc Godinot. Marc Godinot was also the namesake of Marcgodinotius, an adapiform described from Eocene India in 2005.

=== Confusion with Darwinius ===
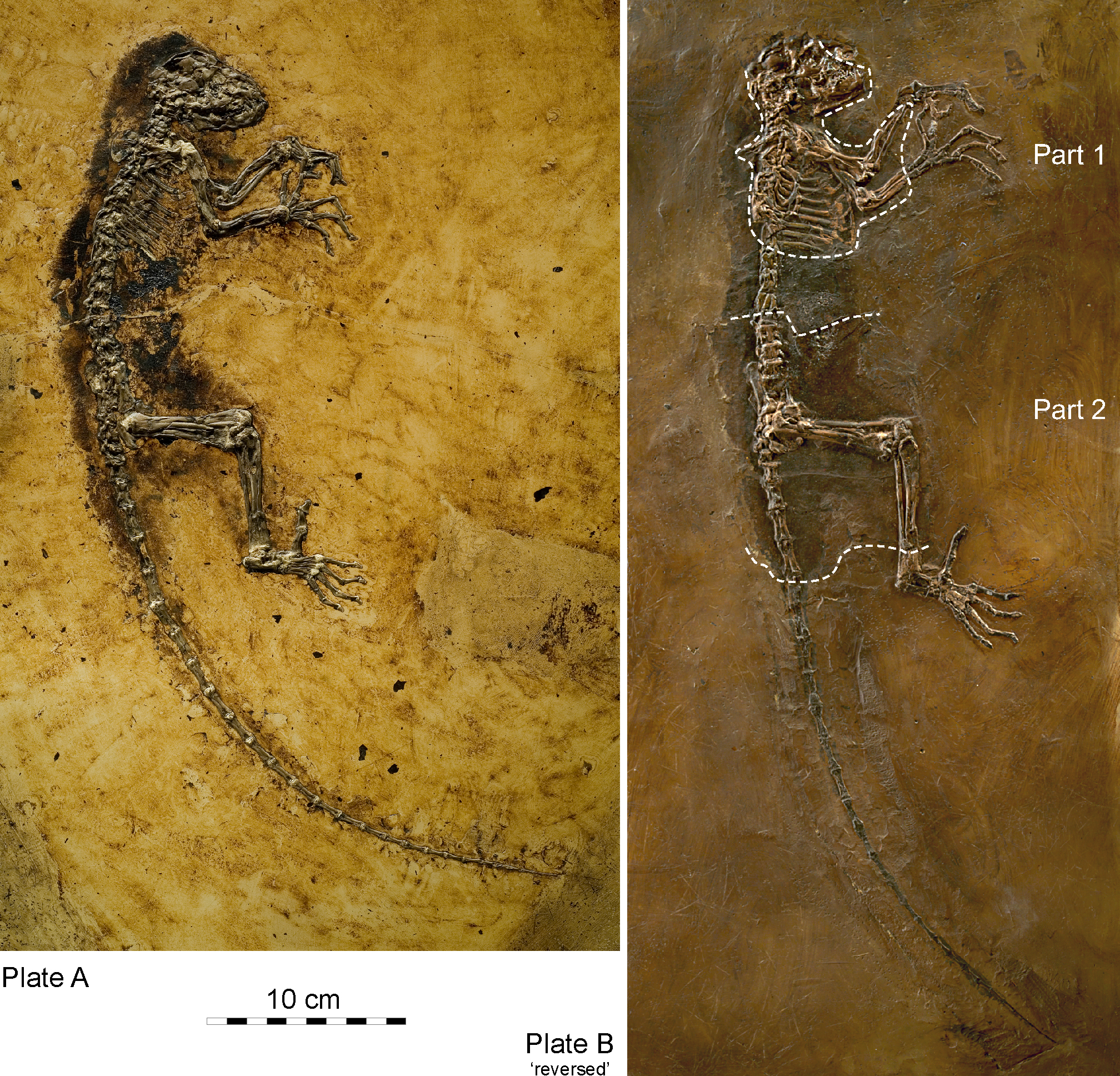
The holotype of Darwinius: the complete part slab ("Ida") in Norway (left), and the partially-forged counterpart slab in Wyoming (right), previously considered a Godinotia fossil.

One purported Godinotia fossil was later recognized as a fossil of Darwinius masillae, an adapiform from the Messel Pit which was formally described in 2009. The fossil in question is a partial skeleton purchased in 1991 by Swiss fossil collector Burkhard Pohl, founder of the Wyoming Dinosaur Center (WDC) in Thermopolis, Wyoming. Though some details of its origin are unknown, it was found it 1983 at the Messel Pit, a shale quarry near Hesse renowned for its fossil preservation. The skeleton is a partial forgery; fossil traders had previously added fake bones to create a more marketable appearance. The hands, feet, and portions of the snout and torso are completely sculpted from polyester, and tail is a replica of another mammal fossil. Yet enough genuine bone was preserved to indicate that the rest of the skeleton belonged to an adapiform primate, the sixth primate fossil discovered in the Messel Pit.

Franzen (1994) noted similarities between the Geiseltal fossils of "Pronycticebus" neglectus and Pohl's new fossil. He suggested that P. neglectus was actually a species of Caenopithecus, a proposal criticized by Godinot (1998). When Franzen fully described Pohl's specimen in 2000, he considered it a juvenile specimen of his new genus, Godinotia, adding to the fossils previously described from Geiseltal. In 2009, Franzen and his colleagues took another look at the WDC fossil. They recognized it as the missing counterpart of a far more complete and unblemished fossil purchased by the Natural History Museum of the University of Oslo (PMO) in 2007. Some of the fake parts of the WDC fossil were apparently modeled directly off of the PMO fossil. The Norway fossil ("Ida") was united with the Wyoming specimen as the holotype of a new species, Darwinius masillae. This left the only valid Godinotia fossils as the material from Geiseltal, not the Messel pit. The main difference between Darwinius and the original Godinotia holotype is that Godinotia has longer and more slender limbs.
