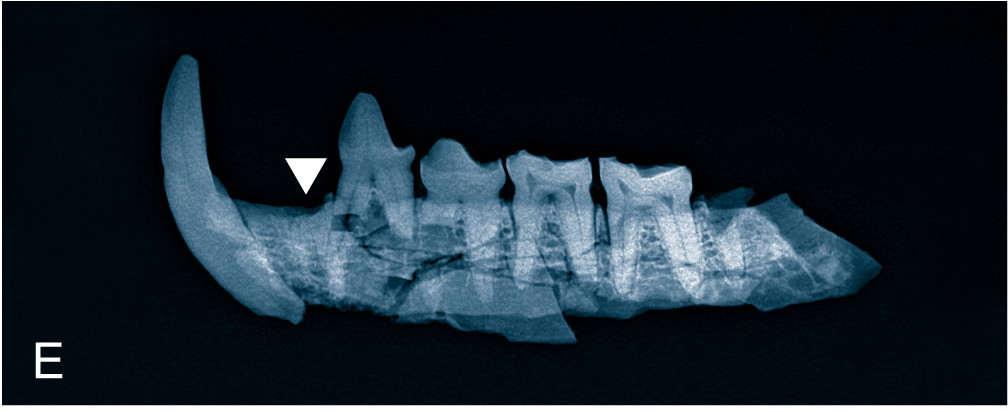
- Radiograph of Protoadapis ignoratus jaw

Scientific classification
- Kingdom: Animalia
- Phylum: Chordata
- Class: Mammalia
- Order: Primates
- Suborder: Strepsirrhini
- Family: †Notharctidae
- Subfamily: †Cercamoniinae; Gingerich, 1975

Diversity
- About 10 genera

= Cercamoniinae =

Cercamoniinae Temporal range: 56.0–33.9 Ma Eocene

Extinct subfamily of mammals

Cercamoniinae is a subfamily within the extinct primate family Notharctidae primarily found in Europe, although a few genera have been found in North America and Africa.

== Classification ==
- Family Notharctidae
  - Subfamily Cercamoniinae
    - Genus Agerinia
    - Genus Anchomomys
    - Genus Barnesia
    - Genus Buxella
    - Genus Donrussellia
    - Genus Mazateronodon
    - Genus Panobius
    - Genus Periconodon
    - Genus Pronycticebus
    - Genus Protoadapis
