= Pronycticebus =

Pronycticebus Temporal range: Early–Middle Eocene

Scientific classification
- Kingdom: Animalia
- Phylum: Chordata
- Class: Mammalia
- Order: Primates
- Suborder: Strepsirrhini
- Family: †Notharctidae
- Subfamily: †Cercamoniinae
- Genus: †Pronycticebus; G. Grandidier, 1904

Type species
- †Pronycticebus gaudryi G. Grandidier, 1904

Species
- P. gaudryi

Extinct genus of primates

Pronycticebus was a genus of adapiform primates that lived during the early to middle Eocene. It is represented by Pronycticebus gaudryi, from the Quercy Phosphorites Formation of France. A second species, P. neglectus, was moved to its own genus Godinotia in 2000.
