= Panobius =

Panobius Temporal range: Early or Middle Eocene

Scientific classification
- Domain: Eukaryota
- Kingdom: Animalia
- Phylum: Chordata
- Class: Mammalia
- Order: Primates
- Suborder: Strepsirrhini
- Family: †Notharctidae
- Genus: †Panobius; Russell & Gingerich, 1987
- Species: †P. afridi

Binomial name
- †Panobius afridi Russell & Gingerich, 1987

Extinct genus of primates

Panobius is a genus of adapiform primate that lived in Asia during the early or middle Eocene.
