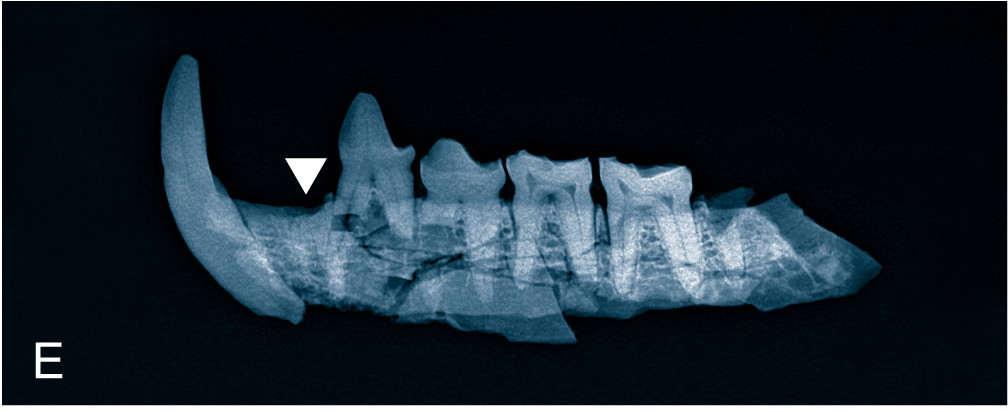
- Radiograph of Protoadapis ignoratus jaw

Scientific classification
- Kingdom: Animalia
- Phylum: Chordata
- Class: Mammalia
- Infraclass: Placentalia
- Order: Primates
- Suborder: Strepsirrhini
- Family: †Notharctidae
- Subfamily: †Cercamoniinae
- Genus: †Protoadapis; Lemoine, 1878

Type species
- †Protoadapis curvicuspidens Lemoine, 1878

Species
- P. andrei; P. angustidens; P. curvicuspidens; P. ignoratus; P. muechelnensis; P. recticuspidens; P. weigelti

= Protoadapis =

Protoadapis Temporal range: Middle Eocene

Extinct genus of primates

Protoadapis is a genus of adapiform primate that lived in Europe during the early middle Eocene.
