= Jørn Hurum =

Norwegian paleontologist

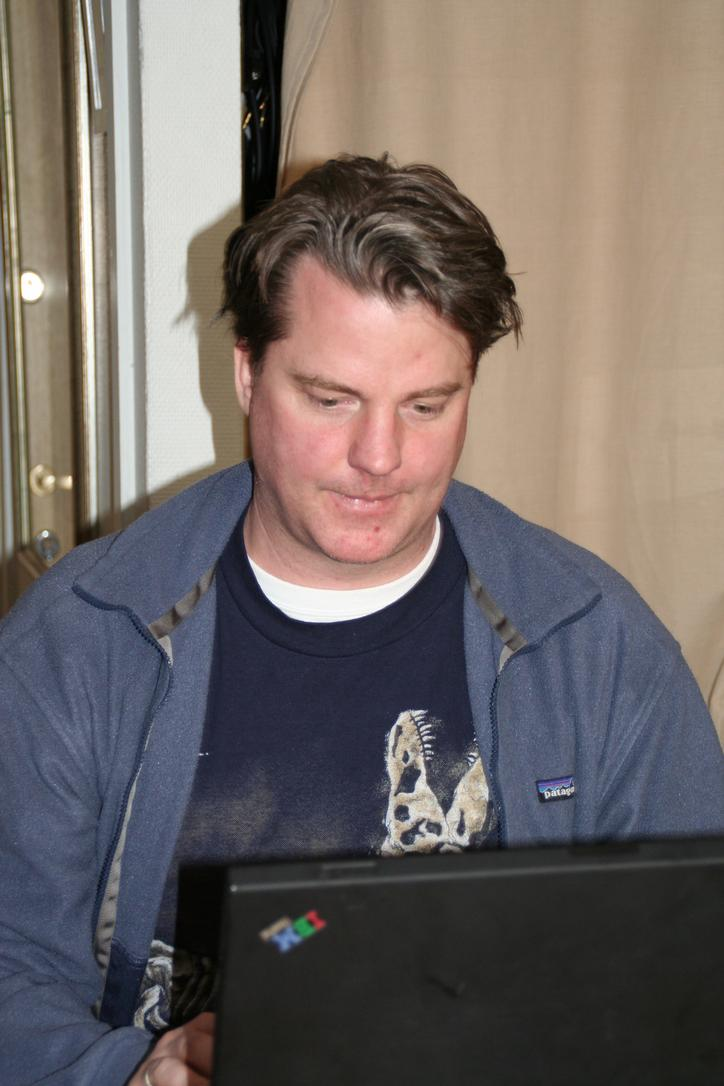
Hurum in 2006

Jørn Harald Hurum (born November 4, 1967) is a Norwegian paleontologist and popularizer of science. He is a vertebrate paleontologist and holds an associate professor position at the Natural History Museum of the University of Oslo. He has studied dinosaurs, primitive mammals and plesiosaurs.

== Media ==
Hurum is known as a popularizer of science with a high media profile. He is the author of the book Menneskets utvikling ("The Evolution of Man") and the host of the segment Jørns hjørne ("Jørn's Corner") on the popular-science program "Newton" on Norwegian television. He also co-hosts the radio program Hurum og Ødegaard ("Hurum and Ødegaard") with astrophysicist Knut Jørgen Røed Ødegaard on Norwegian radio. In 2001, Hurum was awarded Oslo University's "Formidlingspris," an award for the popularization of science, which he shared with Hans Arne Nakrem and Geir Søli. He was awarded the prize again in 2009 for his work publicizing "Ida", the Darwinius find.

Hurum appears in the documentary The Colour of Ink, discussing pigment that he recovered from the ink sac of a 95-million-year-old fossilized octopus, which was then used by paleo artist Esther van Hulsen to produce an illustration of the octopus.

== Discoveries ==
Hurum has done work on a wide range of vertebrate palaeontology, ranging from Mesozoic mammals, theropod dinosaurs and plesiosaurs from Svalbard. In 2006 his team uncovered an enormous short-necked plesiosaur, the Pliosaurus funkei, possibly the largest carnivore found to date. His main work continues to be in the field of plesiosaurs and ichthyosaurs from Svalbard.

In May, 2009, he announced the acquisition and scientific description of a 47-million-year-old, 95% complete skeleton of a primitive primate, Darwinius masillae, that had been in the private collection of an amateur fossil collector for 25 years.

Hurum named the specimen "Ida", after his daughter.

== Controversy ==
Some experts in the scientific community were critical of the 2009 media campaign Hurum orchestrated to publicize his find Darwinius masillae. Matt Cartmill, an anthropologist from Duke University, said "The P.R. campaign on this fossil is I think more of a story than the fossil itself". Hurum's reputation was further tarnished when it turned out that the fossil was not a "Revolutionary Scientific Find That Will Change Everything," as he had claimed in his press release, and that some of the key scientific claims he had made for Darwinius masillae failed scientific scrutiny.

Hurum was named a 2011 National Geographic Emerging Explorer.
