= Periconodon =

Periconodon Temporal range: Middle Eocene

Scientific classification
- Kingdom: Animalia
- Phylum: Chordata
- Class: Mammalia
- Infraclass: Placentalia
- Order: Primates
- Suborder: Strepsirrhini
- Family: †Notharctidae
- Subfamily: †Cercamoniinae
- Genus: †Periconodon; Stehlin, 1916

Type species
- †Periconodon helveticus Stehlin, 1916

Species
- P. helleri; P. helveticus; P. huerzeleri; P. jaegeri; P. lemoinei

Extinct genus of primates

Periconodon is a genus of adapiform primate that lived in western Europe during the early middle Eocene.
