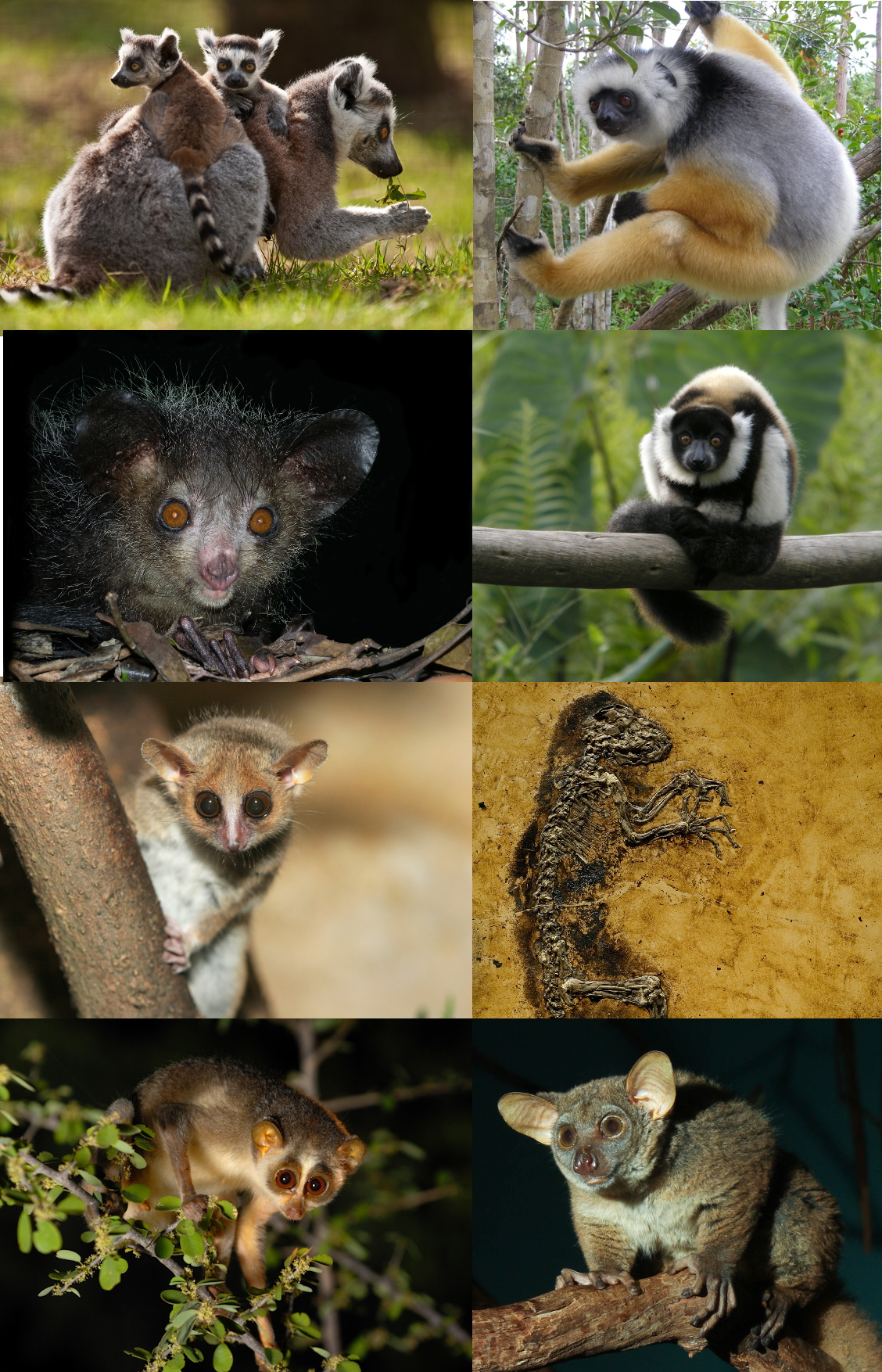
- A sample of strepsirrhine diversity; eight biological genera are depicted (from top, left to right): Lemur, Propithecus, Daubentonia, Varecia, Microcebus, †Darwinius, Loris, Otolemur

Scientific classification
- Kingdom: Animalia
- Phylum: Chordata
- Class: Mammalia
- Order: Primates
- Suborder: Strepsirrhini; É. Geoffroy, 1812

Infraorders
- †Adapiformes; Lemuriformes (Note: Although the monophyletic relationship between lemurs and lorisoids is widely accepted, their clade name is not. The term lemuriform is used here because it derives from one popular taxonomy that clumps the clade of toothcombed primates into one infraorder and the extinct, non-toothcombed adapiforms into another, both within the suborder Strepsirrhini. However, another popular alternative taxonomy places the lorisoids in their own infraorder, Lorisiformes.) (See text)
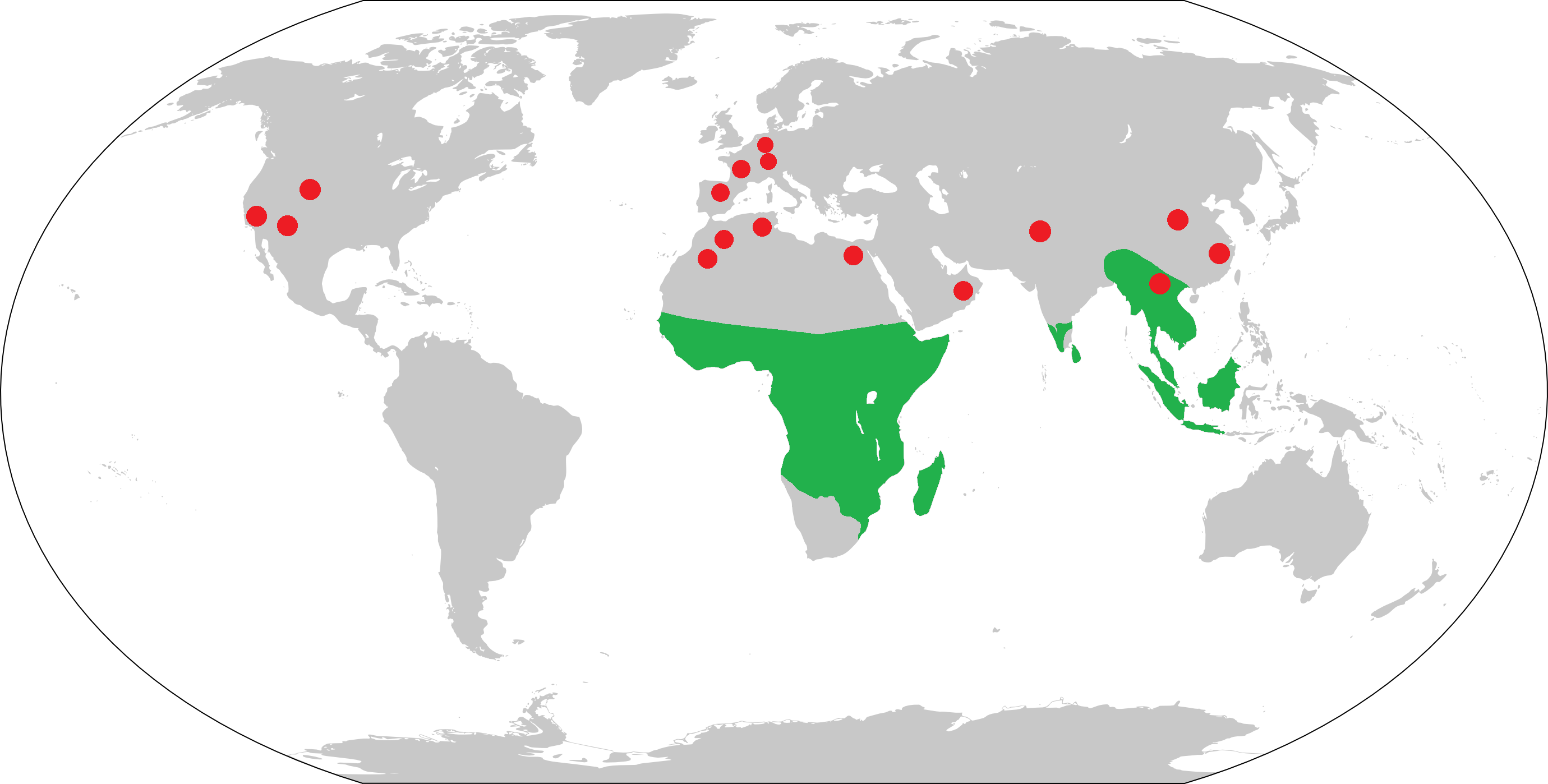
- ● Eocene-Miocene fossil sites Range of extant strepsirrhine primates

= Strepsirrhini =

Strepsirrhini Temporal range: 55.8–0 Ma Early Eocene to Present

Suborder of primates

Strepsirrhini or Strepsirhini (/ˌstrɛpsəˈraɪni/; STREP-sə-RY-nee) is a suborder of primates that includes the lemuriform primates, which consist of the lemurs of Madagascar, galagos ("bushbabies") and pottos from Africa, and the lorises from India and Southeast Asia. Collectively they are referred to as strepsirrhines.

Also belonging to the suborder are the extinct adapiform primates, which thrived during the Eocene in Europe, North America, and Asia, but disappeared from most of the Northern Hemisphere as the climate cooled. Adapiforms are sometimes referred to as being "lemur-like", although the diversity of both lemurs and adapiforms does not support this comparison.

Strepsirrhines are defined by their "wet" (moist) rhinarium (the tip of the snout) – hence the colloquial but inaccurate term "wet-nosed" – similar to the rhinaria of canines and felines. They also have a smaller brain than comparably sized simians, large olfactory lobes for smell, a vomeronasal organ to detect pheromones, and a bicornuate uterus with an epitheliochorial placenta. Their eyes contain a reflective layer to improve their night vision, and their eye sockets include a ring of bone around the eye, but they lack a wall of thin bone behind it.

Strepsirrhine primates produce their own vitamin C, whereas haplorhine primates must obtain it from their diets. Lemuriform primates are characterized by a toothcomb, a specialized set of teeth in the front, lower part of the mouth mostly used for combing fur during grooming.

Many of today's living strepsirrhines are endangered due to habitat destruction, hunting for bushmeat, and live capture for the exotic pet trade. Both living and extinct strepsirrhines are behaviorally diverse, although all are primarily arboreal (tree-dwelling). Most living lemuriforms are nocturnal, while most adapiforms were diurnal. Both living and extinct groups primarily fed on fruit, leaves, and insects.

== Etymology ==
The taxonomic name Strepsirrhini derives from the Greek στρέψις strepsis "a turning round" and ῥίς rhis "nose, snout, (in pl.) nostrils" (GEN ῥινός rhinos), which refers to the appearance of the sinuous (comma-shaped) nostrils on the rhinarium or wet nose. The name was first used by French naturalist Étienne Geoffroy Saint-Hilaire in 1812 as a subordinal rank comparable to Platyrrhini (New World monkeys) and Catarrhini (Old World monkeys). In his description, he mentioned "Les narines terminales et sinueuses" ("Nostrils terminal and winding").

When British zoologist Reginald Innes Pocock revived Strepsirrhini and defined Haplorhini in 1918, he omitted the second "r" from both ("Strepsirhini" and "Haplorhini" instead of "Strepsirrhini" and "Haplorrhini"), although he did not remove the second "r" from Platyrrhini or Catarrhini, both of which were also named by É. Geoffroy in 1812. Following Pocock, many researchers continued to spell Strepsirrhini with a single "r" until primatologists Paulina Jenkins and Prue Napier pointed out the error in 1987.

== Evolutionary history ==
Primate phylogeny

- Euarchonta
  - Scandentia (treeshrews)
  - Primatomorpha
    - Dermoptera (colugos)
    - Primates
      - †Plesiadapiformes
      - Euprimates
        - Haplorhini
          - Simians
          - Tarsiers
          - †Omomyiformes
        - Strepsirrhini
          - †Adapiformes
          - Lemuriformes
            - Lorisoids
            - Lemurs

Strepsirrhines and haplorhines diverged shortly after the emergence of the first true primates (euprimates). The relationship between euprimates, treeshrews, colugos, and plesiadapiforms is less certain. Sometimes plesiadapiforms are grouped with the euprimates under the order Primates, colugos are grouped with primates under Primatomorpha, and all four are grouped under Euarchonta.

Strepsirrhines include the extinct adapiforms and the lemuriform primates, which include lemurs and lorisoids (lorises, pottos, and galagos). Strepsirrhines diverged from the haplorhine primates near the beginning of the primate radiation between 55 and 90 mya. Older divergence dates are based on genetic analysis estimates, while younger dates are based on the scarce fossil record. Lemuriform primates may have evolved from either cercamoniines or sivaladapids, both of which were adapiforms that may have originated in Asia. They were once thought to have evolved from adapids, a more specialized and younger branch of adapiform primarily from Europe.

Lemurs rafted from Africa to Madagascar between 47 and 54 mya, whereas the lorises split from the African galagos around 40 mya and later colonized Asia. The lemuriforms, and particularly the lemurs of Madagascar, are often portrayed inappropriately as "living fossils" or as examples of "basal", or "inferior" primates. These views have historically hindered the understanding of mammalian evolution and the evolution of strepsirrhine traits, such as their reliance on smell (olfaction), characteristics of their skeletal anatomy, and their brain size, which is relatively small. In the case of lemurs, natural selection has driven this isolated population of primates to diversify significantly and fill a rich variety of ecological niches, despite their smaller and less complex brains compared to simians.

=== Unclear origin ===
The divergence between strepsirrhines, simians, and tarsiers likely followed almost immediately after primates first evolved. Although few fossils of living primate groups – lemuriforms, tarsiers, and simians – are known from the Early to Middle Eocene, evidence from genetics and recent fossil finds both suggest they may have been present during the early adaptive radiation.

The origin of the earliest primates that the simians and tarsiers both evolved from is a mystery. Both their place of origin and the group from which they emerged are uncertain. Although the fossil record demonstrating their initial radiation across the Northern Hemisphere is very detailed, the fossil record from the tropics (where primates most likely first developed) is very sparse, particularly around the time that primates and other major clades (Note: A "clade" is a group made up of an ancestor and all its descendants.) of eutherian mammals first appeared.

Lacking detailed tropical fossils, geneticists and primatologists have used genetic analyses to determine the relatedness between primate lineages and the amount of time since they diverged. Using this molecular clock, divergence dates for the major primate lineages have suggested that primates evolved more than 80–90 mya, nearly 40 million years before the first examples appear in the fossil record.

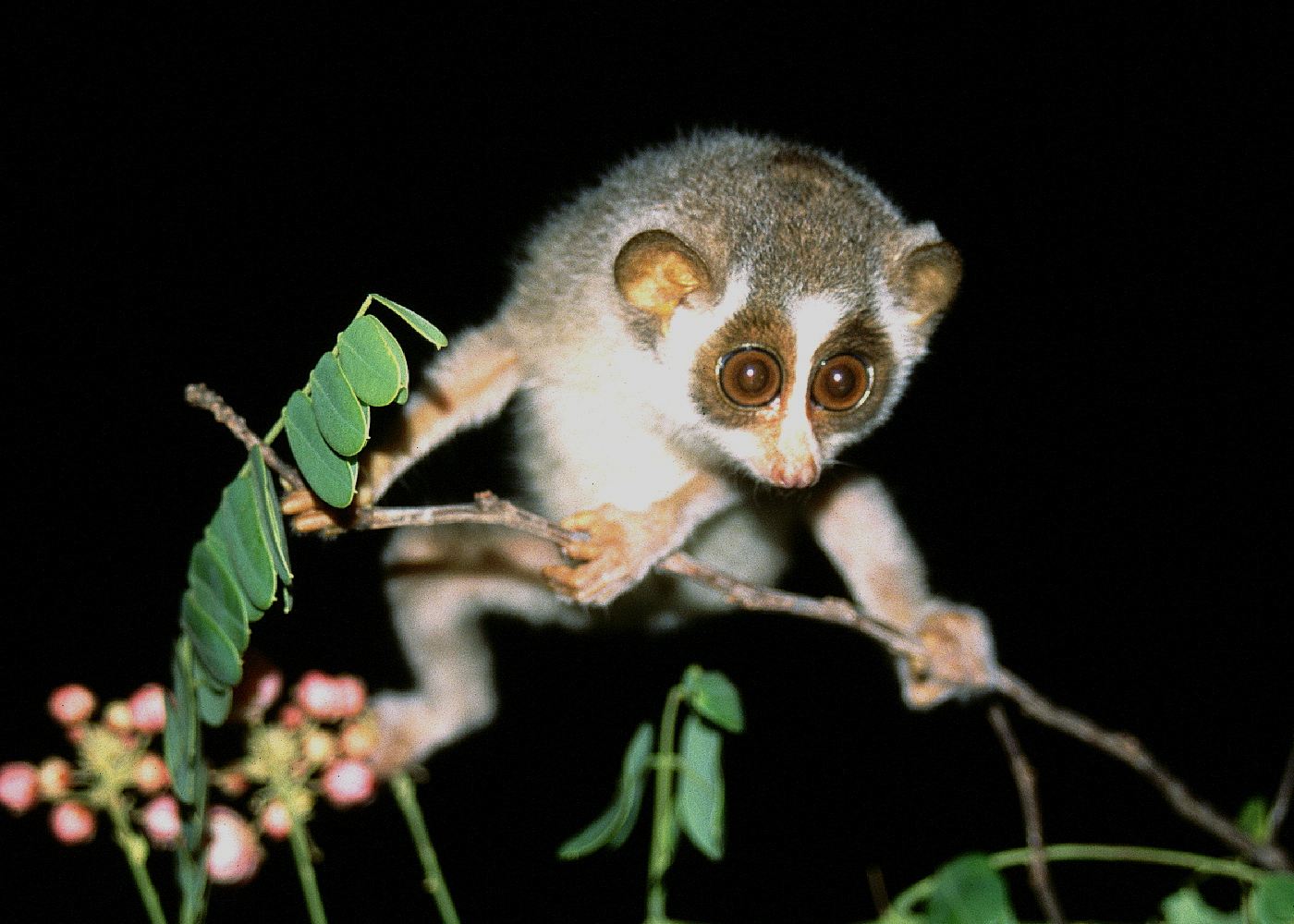
Early primates possessed adaptations for arboreal locomotion that enabled maneuvering along fine branches, as seen in this slender loris.

The early primates include both nocturnal and diurnal small-bodied species, and all were arboreal, with hands and feet specially adapted for maneuvering on small branches. Plesiadapiforms from the early Paleocene are sometimes considered "archaic primates", because their teeth resembled those of early primates and because they possessed adaptations to living in trees, such as a divergent big toe (hallux). Although plesiadapiforms were closely related to primates, they may represent a paraphyletic group from which primates may or may not have directly evolved, and some genera may have been more closely related to colugos, (Note: Colugos are also called dermopterans and flying lemurs.) which are thought to be more closely related to primates.

The first true primates (euprimates) do not appear in the fossil record until the early Eocene (~55 mya), at which point they radiated across the Northern Hemisphere during a brief period of rapid global warming known as the Paleocene–Eocene Thermal Maximum. These first primates included Cantius, Donrussellia, Altanius, and Teilhardina on the northern continents, as well as the more questionable (and fragmentary) fossil Altiatlasius from Paleocene Africa. These earliest fossil primates are often divided into two groups, adapiforms (Note: Adapiforms are sometimes called adapids or adapoids.) and omomyiforms. (Note: The omomyiformes or omomyids are suspected to have been closely related to the tarsiers.) Both appeared suddenly in the fossil record without transitional forms to indicate ancestry, and both groups were rich in diversity and were widespread throughout the Eocene.

The last branch to develop were the adapiforms, a diverse and widespread group that thrived during the Eocene (56 to 34 million years ago [mya]) in Europe, North America, and Asia. They disappeared from most of the Northern Hemisphere as the climate cooled: The last of the adapiforms died out at the end of the Miocene (~7 mya).

=== Adapiform evolution ===
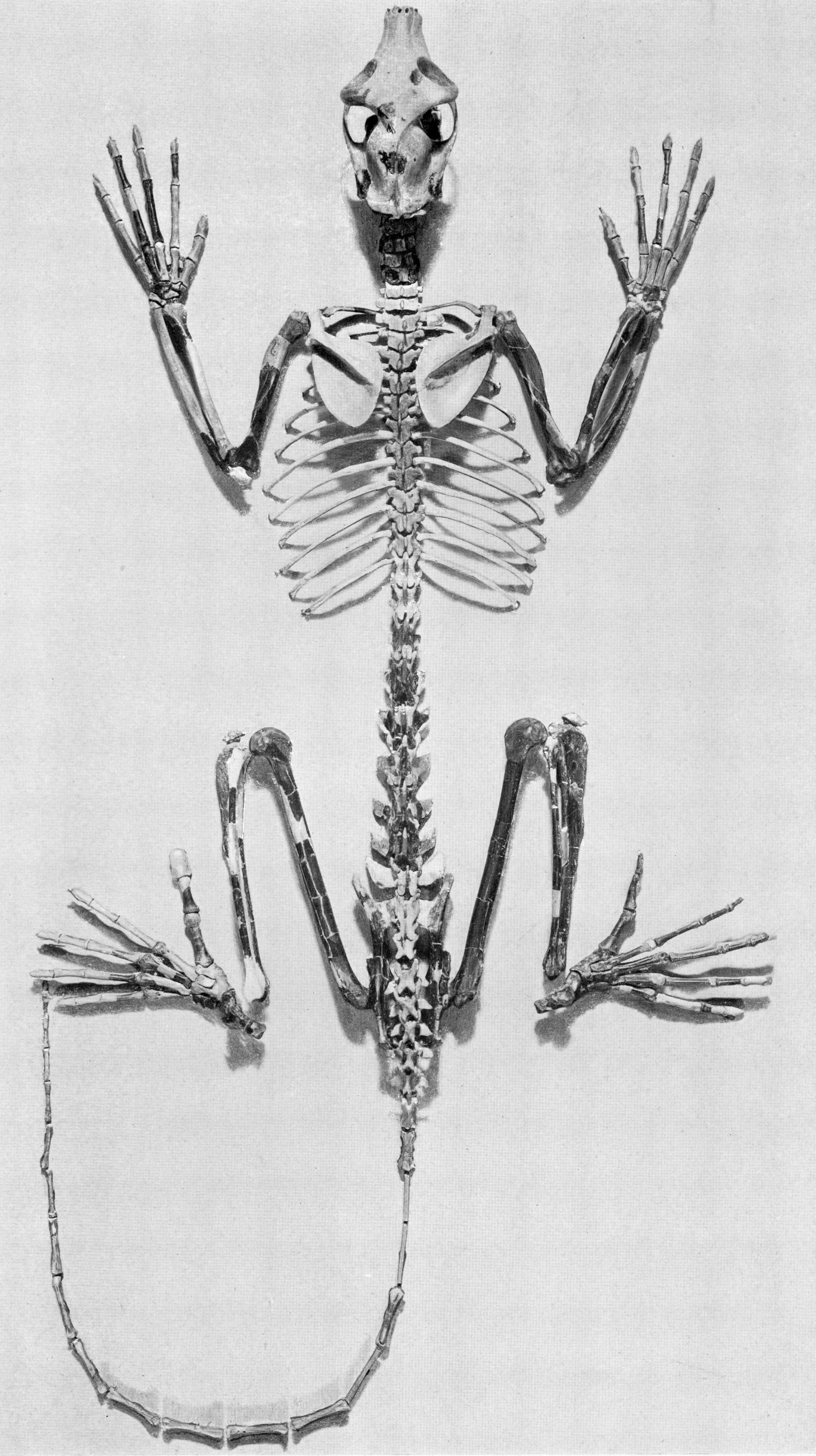
Notharctus, a type of North American adapiform, resembled lemurs but did not give rise to them.

Adapiform primates are extinct strepsirrhines that shared many anatomical similarities with lemurs. They are sometimes referred to as lemur-like primates, although the diversity of both lemurs and adapiforms do not support this analogy.

Like the living strepsirrhines, adapiforms were extremely diverse, with at least 30 genera and 80 species known from the fossil record as of the early 2000s. They diversified across Laurasia during the Eocene, some reaching North America via a land bridge. They were among the most common mammals found in the fossil beds from that time. A few rare species have also been found in northern Africa. The most basal of the adapiforms include the genera Cantius from North America and Europe and Donrussellia from Europe. The latter bears the most ancestral traits, so it is often considered a sister group or stem group of the other adapiforms.

Adapiforms are often divided into three major groups:

- Adapids were most commonly found in Europe, although the oldest specimens (Adapoides from middle Eocene China) indicate that they most likely evolved in Asia and immigrated. They died out in Europe during the Grande Coupure, part of a significant extinction event at the end of the Eocene.
- Notharctids, which most closely resembled some of Madagascar's lemurs, come from Europe and North America. The European branch is often referred to as cercamoniines. The North American branch thrived during the Eocene, but did not survive into the Oligocene. Like the adapids, the European branch were also extinct by the end of the Eocene.
- Sivaladapids of southern and eastern Asia are best known from the Miocene, and the only adapiforms to survive past the Eocene/Oligocene boundary (~34 mya). Their relationship to the other adapiforms remains unclear. They had vanished before the end of the Miocene (~7 mya).

The relationship between adapiform and lemuriform primates has not been clearly demonstrated, so the position of adapiforms as a paraphyletic stem group is questionable. Both molecular clock data and new fossil finds suggest that the lemuriform divergence from the other primates and the subsequent lemur-lorisoid split both predate the appearance of adapiforms in the early Eocene. New calibration methods may reconcile the discrepancies between the molecular clock and the fossil record, favoring more recent divergence dates. The fossil record suggests that the strepsirrhine adapiforms and the haplorhine omomyiforms had been evolving independently before the early Eocene, although their most basal members share enough dental similarities to suggest that they diverged during the Paleocene (66–55 mya).

=== Lemuriform evolution ===
Lemuriform origins are unclear and debated. American paleontologist Philip Gingerich proposed that lemuriform primates evolved from one of several genera of European adapids based on similarities between the front lower teeth of adapids and the toothcomb of extant lemuriforms; however, this view is not strongly supported due to a lack of clear transitional fossils. Instead, lemuriforms may be descended from a very early branch of Asian cercamoniines or sivaladapids that migrated to northern Africa.

Until discoveries of three 40 million-year-old fossil lorisoids (Karanisia, Saharagalago, and Wadilemur) in the El Fayum deposits of Egypt between 1997 and 2005, the oldest known lemuriforms had come from the early Miocene (~20 mya) of Kenya and Uganda. These newer finds demonstrate that lemuriform primates were present during the middle Eocene in Afro-Arabia and that the lemuriform lineage and all other strepsirrhine taxa had diverged before then. Djebelemur from Tunisia dates to the late early or early middle Eocene (52 to 46 mya) and has been considered a cercamoniine, but also may have been a stem lemuriform. Azibiids from Algeria date to roughly the same time and may be a sister group of the djebelemurids. Together with Plesiopithecus from the late Eocene Egypt, the three may qualify as the stem lemuriforms from Africa.

Molecular clock estimates indicate that lemurs and the lorisoids diverged in Africa during the Paleocene, approximately 62 mya. Between 47 and 54 mya, lemurs dispersed to Madagascar by rafting. In isolation, the lemurs diversified and filled the niches often filled by monkeys and apes today. In Africa, the lorises and galagos diverged during the Eocene, approximately 40 mya. Unlike the lemurs in Madagascar, they have had to compete with monkeys and apes, as well as other mammals.

== History of classification ==
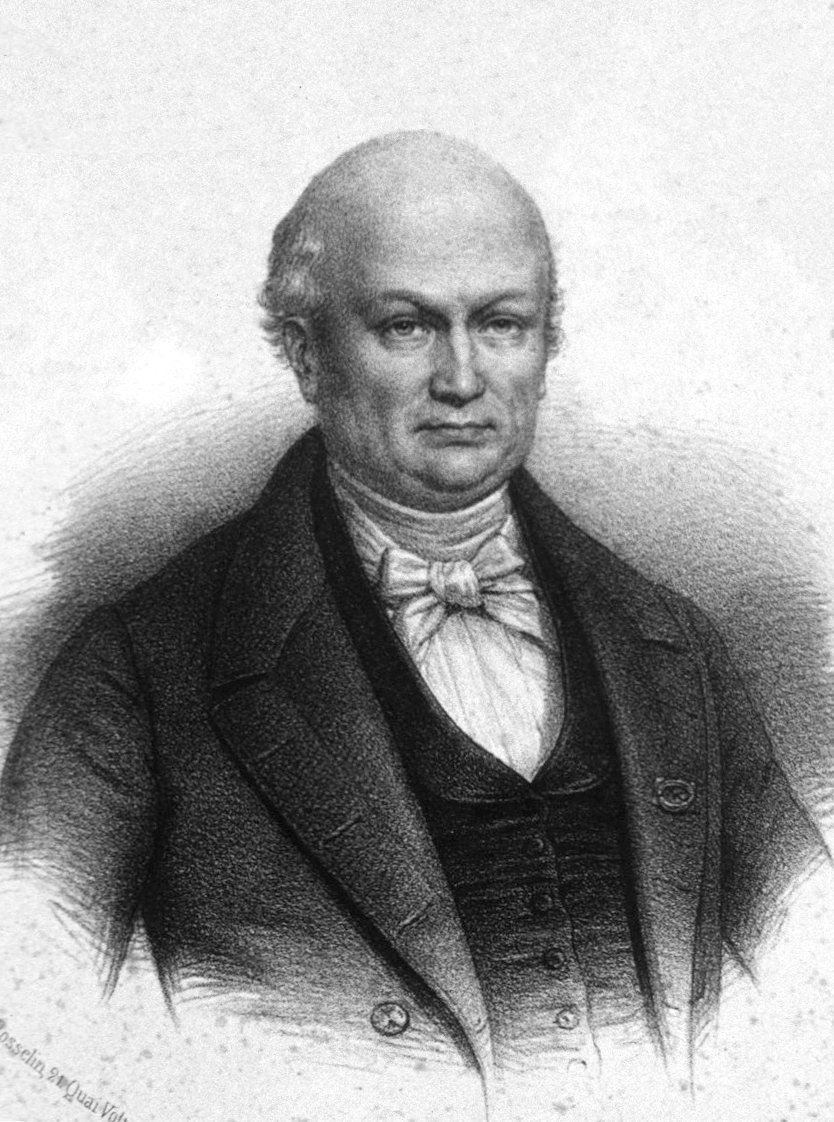
The suborder Strepsirrhini was proposed by É. Geoffroy in 1812.

The taxonomy of strepsirrhines is controversial and has a complicated history. Confused taxonomic terminology and oversimplified anatomical comparisons have created misconceptions about primate and strepsirrhine phylogeny, illustrated by the media attention surrounding the single "Ida" fossil in 2009.

Strepsirrhine primates were first grouped under the genus Lemur by Swedish taxonomist Carl Linnaeus in the 10th edition of Systema Naturae published in 1758. At the time, only three species were recognized, one of which (the colugo) is no longer recognized as a primate. In 1785, Dutch naturalist Pieter Boddaert divided the genus Lemur into two genera: Prosimia for the lemurs, colugos, and tarsiers and Tardigradus for the lorises. Ten years later, É. Geoffroy and Georges Cuvier grouped the tarsiers and galagos due to similarities in their hindlimb morphology, a view supported by German zoologist Johann Karl Wilhelm Illiger, who placed them in the family Macrotarsi while placing the lemurs and tarsiers in the family Prosimia (Prosimii) in 1811. The use of the tarsier-galago classification continued for many years until 1898, when Dutch zoologist Ambrosius Hubrecht demonstrated two different types of placentation (formation of a placenta) in the two groups.

English comparative anatomist William Henry Flower created the suborder Lemuroidea in 1883 to distinguish these primates from the simians, which were grouped under English biologist St. George Jackson Mivart's suborder Anthropoidea (=Simiiformes). According to Flower, the suborder Lemuroidea contained the families Lemuridae (lemurs, lorises, and galagos), Chiromyidae (aye-aye), and Tarsiidae (tarsiers). Lemuroidea was later replaced by Illiger's suborder Prosimii. Many years earlier, in 1812, É. Geoffroy first named the suborder Strepsirrhini, in which he included the tarsiers. This taxonomy went unnoticed until 1918, when Pocock compared the structure of the nose and reinstated the use of the suborder Strepsirrhini, while also moving the tarsiers and the simians into a new suborder, Haplorhini. It was not until 1953, when British anatomist William Charles Osman Hill wrote an entire volume on strepsirrhine anatomy, that Pocock's taxonomic suggestion became noticed and more widely used. Since then, primate taxonomy has shifted between Strepsirrhini-Haplorhini and Prosimii-Anthropoidea multiple times.

Most of the academic literature provides a basic framework for primate taxonomy, usually including several potential taxonomic schemes. Although most experts agree upon phylogeny, many disagree about nearly every level of primate classification.

Competing strepsirrhine taxonomic nomenclature
2 infraorders	3 infraorders
Suborder Strepsirrhini; Infraorder †Adapiformes; Superfamily †Adapoidea; Family †Adapidae; Family †Notharctidae; Family †Sivaladapidae; Infraorder Lemuriformes; Superfamily Lemuroidea; Family †Archaeolemuridae; Family Cheirogaleidae; Family Daubentoniidae; Family Indriidae; Family Lemuridae; Family Lepilemuridae; Family †Megaladapidae; Family †Palaeopropithecidae; Superfamily Lorisoidea; Family Lorisidae; Family Galagidae	Suborder Strepsirrhini; Infraorder †Adapiformes; Superfamily †Adapoidea; Family †Adapidae; Family †Notharctidae; Family †Sivaladapidae; Infraorder Lemuriformes; Superfamily Lemuroidea; Family †Archaeolemuridae; Family Cheirogaleidae; Family Daubentoniidae; Family Indriidae; Family Lemuridae; Family Lepilemuridae; Family †Megaladapidae; Family †Palaeopropithecidae; Infraorder Lorisiformes; Superfamily Lorisoidea; Family Lorisidae; Family Galagidae

=== Controversies ===
The most commonly recurring debate in primatology during the 1970s, 1980s, and early 2000s concerned the phylogenetic position of tarsiers compared to both simians and the other prosimians. Tarsiers are most often placed in either the suborder Haplorhini with the simians or in the suborder Prosimii with the strepsirrhines. Prosimii is one of the two traditional primate suborders and is based on evolutionary grades (groups united by anatomical traits) rather than phylogenetic clades, while the Strepsirrhini-Haplorrhini taxonomy was based on evolutionary relationships. Yet both systems persist because the Prosimii-Anthropoidea taxonomy is familiar and frequently seen in the research literature and textbooks.

Strepsirrhines are traditionally characterized by several symplesiomorphic (ancestral) traits not shared with the simians, particularly the rhinarium. (Note: Since they are thought to be close relatives of tarsiers, omomyiforms are classified as haplorhines. However, the spacing of the roots of their upper incisors suggests that they may have had a rhinarium, like the strepsirrhines.) Other symplesiomorphies include long snouts, convoluted maxilloturbinals, relatively large olfactory bulbs, and smaller brains. The toothcomb is a synapomorphy (shared, derived trait) seen among lemuriforms, although it is frequently and incorrectly used to define the strepsirrhine clade. (Note: Frequent mentions of a "strepsirrhine toothcomb" or references to Strepsirrhini as being "toothcombed primates" can be found in the literature. However, one group of strepsirrhines lacks the toothcomb – the adapiforms. The toothcomb is therefore the primary hallmark of the lemuriforms, although at least one family only retains it in modified form.) Strepsirrhine primates are also united in possessing an epitheliochorial placenta. Unlike the tarsiers and simians, strepsirrhines are capable of producing their own vitamin C and do not need it supplied in their diet. Further genetic evidence for the relationship between tarsiers and simians as a haplorhine clade is the shared possession of three SINE markers.

Because of their historically mixed assemblages which included tarsiers and close relatives of primates, both Prosimii and Strepsirrhini have been considered wastebasket taxa for "lower primates". Regardless, the strepsirrhine and haplorrhine clades are generally accepted and viewed as the preferred taxonomic division. Yet tarsiers still closely resemble both strepsirrhines and simians in different ways, and since the early split between strepsirrhines, tarsiers and simians is ancient and hard to resolve, a third taxonomic arrangement with three suborders is sometimes used: Prosimii, Tarsiiformes, and Anthropoidea. More often, the term "prosimian" is no longer used in official taxonomy, but is still used to illustrate the behavioral ecology of tarsiers relative to the other primates.

In addition to the controversy over tarsiers, the debate over the origins of simians once called the strepsirrhine clade into question. Arguments for an evolutionary link between adapiforms and simians made by paleontologists Gingerich, Elwyn L. Simons, Tab Rasmussen, and others could have potentially excluded adapiforms from Strepsirrhini. In 1975, Gingerich proposed a new suborder, Simiolemuriformes, to suggest that strepsirrhines are more closely related to simians than tarsiers. However, no clear relationship between the two had been demonstrated by the early 2000s. The idea reemerged briefly in 2009 during the media attention surrounding Darwinius masillae (dubbed "Ida"), a cercamoniine from Germany that was touted as a "missing link between humans and earlier primates" (simians and adapiforms). However, the cladistic analysis was flawed and the phylogenetic inferences and terminology were vague. Although the authors noted that Darwinius was not a "fossil lemur", they did emphasize the absence of a toothcomb, which adapiforms did not possess.

=== Infraordinal classification and clade terminology ===
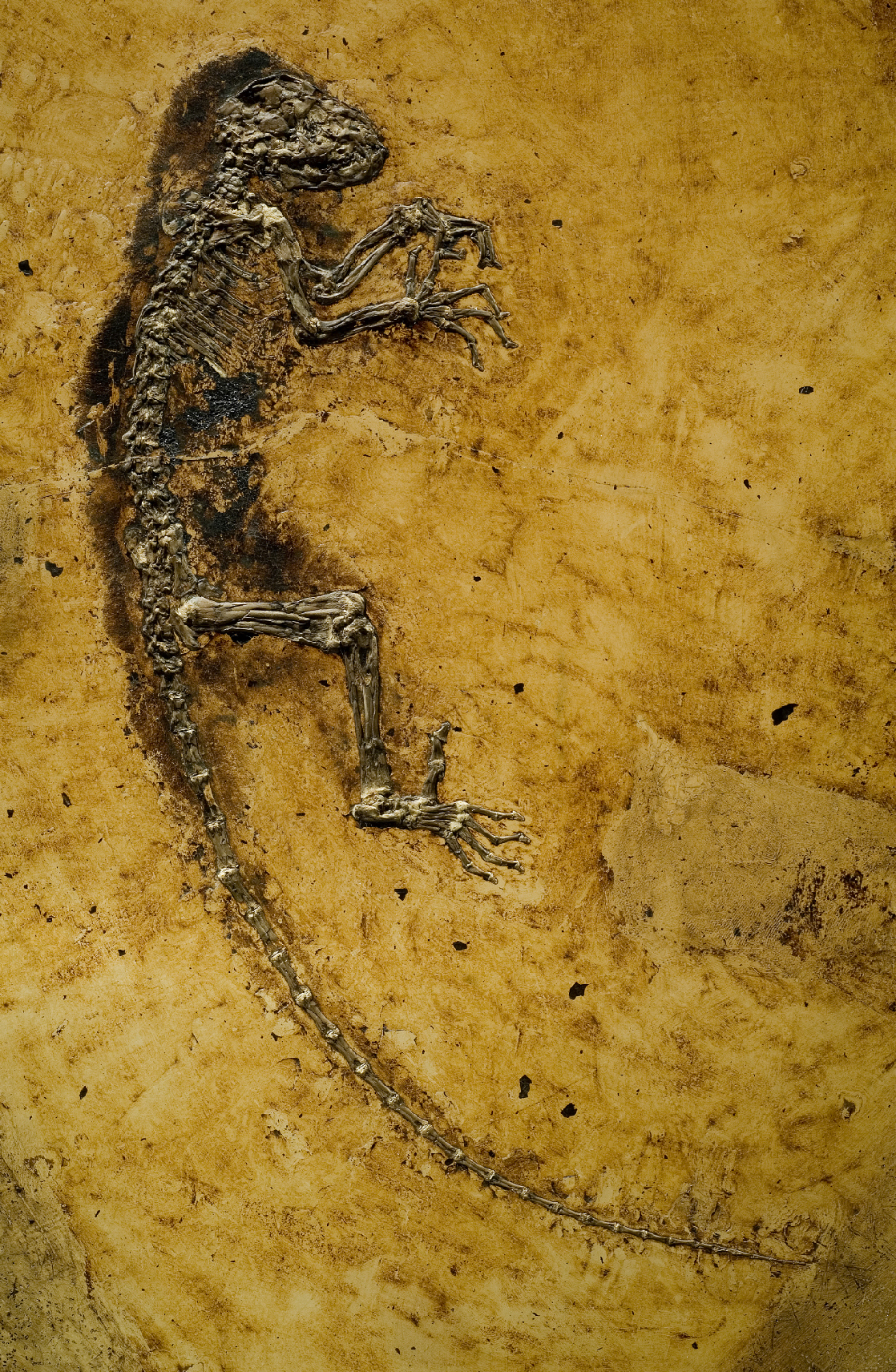
The media attention over "Ida" played upon confused terminology and misconceptions about strepsirrhines.

Strepsirrhini phylogeny

- - †Adapiformes
  - - stem lemuriforms
    - lemuriforms or crown strepsirrhines
      - lemuroid clade
        - Daubentoniidae
        - other lemurs
      - lorisoid clade
        - lorises
        - galagos

Within Strepsirrhini, two common classifications include either two infraorders (Adapiformes and Lemuriformes) or three infraorders (Adapiformes, Lemuriformes, Lorisiformes). A less common taxonomy places the aye-aye (Daubentoniidae) in its own infraorder, Chiromyiformes. In some cases, plesiadapiforms are included within the order Primates, in which case Euprimates is sometimes treated as a suborder, with Strepsirrhini becoming an infraorder, and the Lemuriformes and others become parvorders. Regardless of the infraordinal taxonomy, Strepsirrhini is composed of three ranked superfamilies and 14 families, seven of which are extinct. Three of these extinct families included the recently extinct giant lemurs of Madagascar, many of which died out within the last 1,000 years following human arrival on the island.

When Strepsirrhini is divided into two infraorders, the clade containing all toothcombed primates can be called "lemuriforms". When it is divided into three infraorders, the term "lemuriforms" refers only to Madagascar's lemurs, and the toothcombed primates are referred to as either "crown strepsirrhines" or "extant strepsirrhines". Confusion of this specific terminology with the general term "strepsirrhine", along with oversimplified anatomical comparisons and vague phylogenetic inferences, can lead to misconceptions about primate phylogeny and misunderstandings about primates from the Eocene, as seen with the media coverage of Darwinius. Because the skeletons of adapiforms share strong similarities with those of lemurs and lorises, researchers have often referred to them as "primitive" strepsirrhines, lemur ancestors, or a sister group to the living strepsirrhines. They are included in Strepsirrhini, and are considered basal members of the clade. Although their status as true primates is not questioned, the questionable relationship between adapiforms and other living and fossil primates leads to multiple classifications within Strepsirrhini. Often, adapiforms are placed in their own infraorder due to anatomical differences with lemuriforms and their unclear relationship. When shared traits with lemuriforms (which may or may not be synapomorphic) are emphasized, they are sometimes reduced to families within the infraorder Lemuriformes (or superfamily Lemuroidea).

The first fossil primate described was the adapiform Adapis parisiensis by French naturalist Georges Cuvier in 1821, who compared it to a hyrax ("le Daman"), then considered a member of a now obsolete group called pachyderms. It was not recognized as a primate until it was reevaluated in the early 1870s. Originally, adapiforms were all included under the family Adapidae, which was divided into two or three subfamilies: Adapinae, Notharctinae, and sometimes Sivaladapinae. All North American adapiforms were lumped under Notharctinae, while the Old World forms were usually assigned to Adapinae. Around the 1990s, two distinct groups of European "adapids" began to emerge, based on differences in the postcranial skeleton and the teeth. One of these two European forms was identified as cercamoniines, which were allied with the notharctids found mostly in North America, while the other group falls into the traditional adapid classification. The three major adapiform divisions are now typically regarded as three families within Adapiformes (Notharctidae, Adapidae and Sivaladapidae), but other divisions ranging from one to five families are used as well.

== Anatomy and physiology ==
=== Grooming apparatus ===
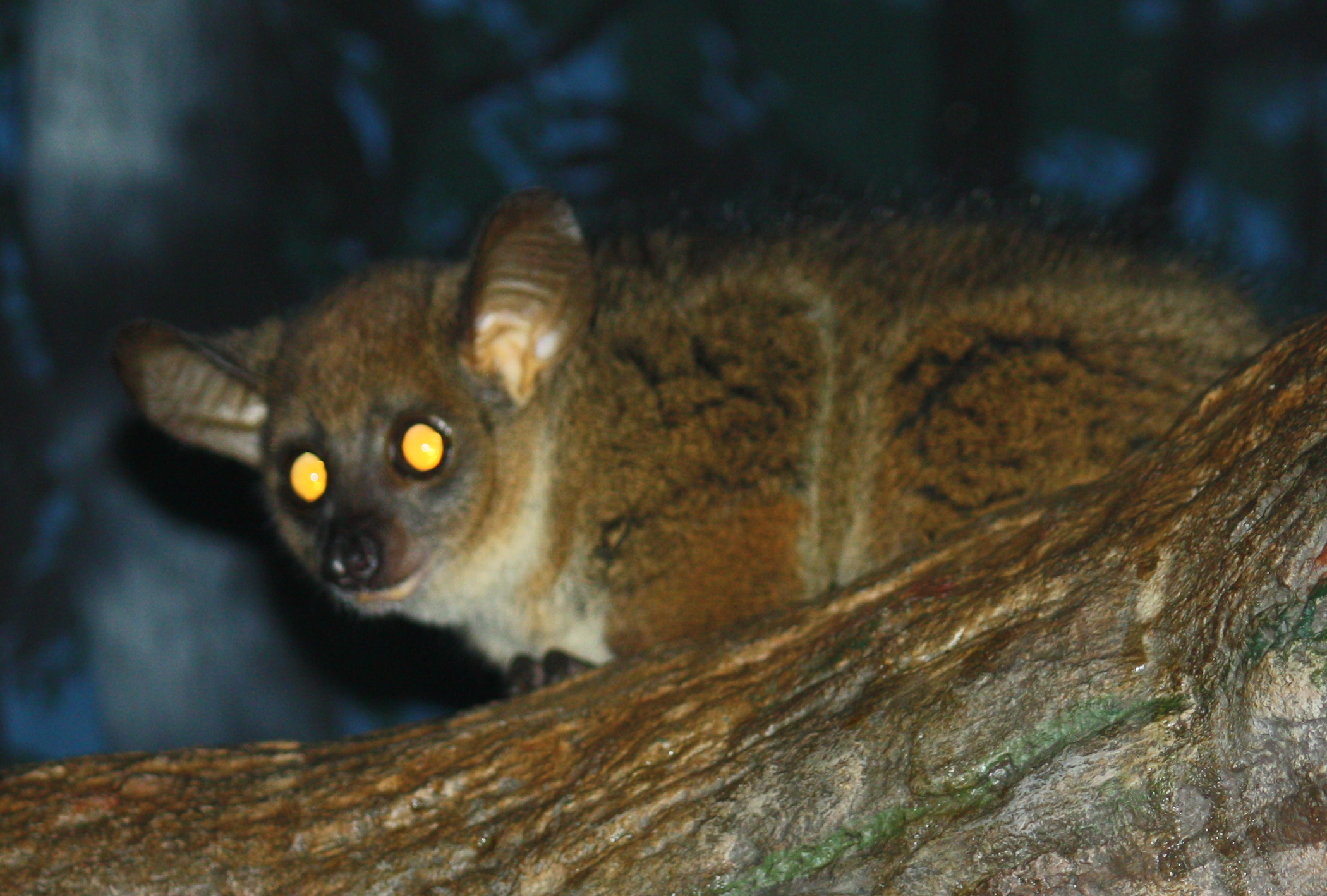
Strepsirrhines have a reflective layer in the eye, called a tapetum lucidum, that helps them see better at night.

All lemuriforms possess a specialized dental structure called a "toothcomb", with the exception of the aye-aye, in which the structure has been modified into two continually growing (hypselodont) incisors (or canine teeth), similar to those of rodents. Often, the toothcomb is incorrectly used to characterize all strepsirrhines. Instead, it is unique to lemuriforms and is not seen among adapiforms.

Lemuriforms groom orally, and also possess a grooming claw on the second toe of each foot for scratching in areas that are inaccessible to the mouth and tongue. Adapiforms may have had a grooming claw, but there is little evidence of this. The toothcomb consists of either two or four procumbent lower incisors and procumbent lower canine teeth followed by a canine-shaped premolar. It is used to comb the fur during oral grooming. Shed hairs that accumulate between the teeth of the toothcomb are removed by the sublingua or "under-tongue". Adapiforms did not possess a toothcomb. Instead, their lower incisors varied in orientation – from somewhat procumbent to somewhat vertical – and the lower canines were projected upwards and were often prominent.

=== Eyes ===
Like all primates, strepsirrhine orbits (eye sockets) have a postorbital bar, a protective ring of bone created by a connection between the frontal and zygomatic bones. Both living and extinct strepsirrhines lack a thin wall of bone behind the eye, referred to as postorbital closure, which is only seen in haplorhine primates. Although the eyes of strepsirrhines point forward, giving stereoscopic vision, the orbits do not face fully forward. Among living strepsirrhines, most or all species are thought to possess a reflective layer behind the retina of the eye, called a tapetum lucidum (consisting of riboflavin crystals), which improves vision in low light, but they lack a fovea, which improves day vision. This differs from tarsiers, which lack a tapetum lucidum but possess a fovea. The relative size of cornea in strepsirrhines is similar to nonprimate nocturnal and cathemeral mammals, where as haplorhines have smaller relative sized cornea compared to most nonprimate mammals.

=== Skull ===
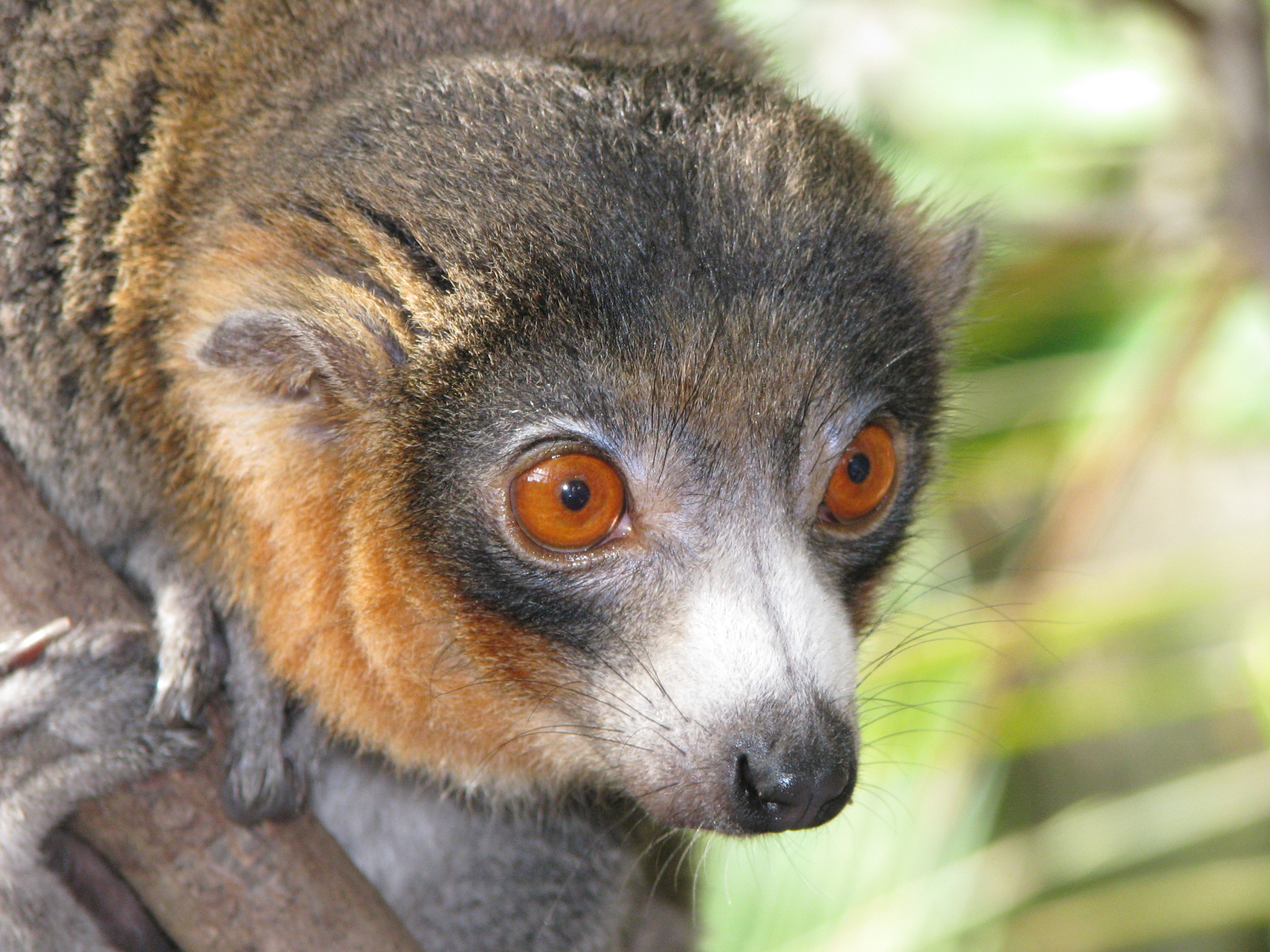
Strepsirrhines are characterized by a typically longer snout and wet nose compared to haplorhine primates.

Strepsirrhine primates have a brain relatively comparable to or slightly larger in size than most mammals. Compared to simians, however, they have a relatively small brain-to-body size ratio. Strepsirrhines are also traditionally noted for their unfused mandibular symphysis (two halves of the lower jaw), however, fusion of the mandibular symphysis was common in adapiforms, notably Notharctus. Also, several extinct giant lemurs exhibited a fused mandibular symphysis.

=== Ears ===
Many nocturnal species have large, independently movable ears, although there are significant differences in sizes and shapes of the ear between species. The structure of the middle and inner ear of strepsirrhines differs between the lemurs and lorisoids. In lemurs, the tympanic cavity, which surrounds the middle ear, is expanded. This leaves the ectotympanic ring, which supports the eardrum, free within the auditory bulla. This trait is also seen in adapiforms. In lorisoids, however, the tympanic cavity is smaller and the ectotympanic ring becomes attached to the edge of the auditory bulla. The tympanic cavity in lorisoids also has two accessory air spaces, which are not present in lemurs.

=== Neck arteries ===
Both lorisoids and cheirogaleid lemurs have replaced the internal carotid artery with an enlarged ascending pharyngeal artery.

=== Ankle bones ===
Strepsirrhines also possess distinctive features in their tarsus (ankle bones) that differentiate them from haplorhines, such as a sloping talo-fibular facet (the face where the talus bone and fibula meet) and a difference in the location of the position of the flexor fibularis tendon on the talus. These differences give strepsirrhines the ability to make more complex rotations of the ankle and indicate that their feet are habitually inverted, or turned inward, an adaptation for grasping vertical supports.

=== Sex characteristics ===
Sexual dichromatism (different coloration patterns between males and females) can be seen in most brown lemur species, but otherwise lemurs show very little if any difference in body size or weight between sexes. This lack of sexual dimorphism is not characteristic of all strepsirrhines. Some adapiforms were sexually dimorphic, with males bearing a larger sagittal crest (a ridge of bone on the top of the skull to which jaw muscles attach) and canine teeth. Lorisoids exhibit some sexual dimorphism, but males are typically no more than 20 percent larger than females.

=== Rhinarium and olfaction ===
The noses of five prosimian primates: (A) dwarf lemur; (B) greater galago; (C) lesser galago; (D) aye-aye; (E) tarsier; (A) through (D) possess a rhinarium and are strepsirrhines, whereas (E) does not and is a haplorhine.

Strepsirrhines have a long snout that ends in a moist and touch-sensitive rhinarium, similar to that of dogs and many other mammals. The rhinarium is surrounded by vibrissae that are also sensitive to touch. Convoluted maxilloturbinals on the inside of their nose filter, warm, and moisten the incoming air, while olfactory receptors of the main olfactory system lining the ethmoturbinals detect airborne smells. The olfactory bulbs of lemurs are comparable in size to those of other arboreal mammals.

The surface of the rhinarium does not have any olfactory receptors, so it is not used for smell in terms of detecting volatile substances. Instead, it has sensitive touch receptors (Merkel cells). The rhinarium, upper lip, and gums are tightly connected by a fold of mucous membrane called the philtrum, which runs from the tip of the nose to the mouth. The upper lip is constrained by this connection and has fewer nerves to control movement, which leaves it less mobile than the upper lips of simians. The philtrum creates a gap (diastema) between the roots of the first two upper incisors.

The strepsirrhine rhinarium can collect relatively non-volatile, fluid-based chemicals (traditionally categorized as pheromones) and transmit them to the vomeronasal organ (VNO), which is located below and in front of the nasal cavity, above the mouth. The VNO is an encased duct-like structure made of cartilage and is isolated from the air passing through the nasal cavity. The VNO is connected to the mouth through nasopalatine ducts (which communicate via the incisive foramen), which pass through the hard palate at the top, front of the mouth. Fluids traveling from the rhinarium to the mouth and then up the nasopalatine ducts to the VNO are detected, and information is relayed to the accessory olfactory bulb, which is relatively large in strepsirrhines. From the accessory olfactory bulb, information is sent to the amygdala, which handles emotions, and then to the hypothalamus, which handles basic body functions and metabolic processes. This neural pathway differs from that used by the main olfactory system.

All lemuriforms have a VNO, as do tarsiers and some New World monkeys. Adapiforms exhibit the gap between the upper incisors, which indicates the presence of a VNO, but there is some disagreement over whether or not they possessed a rhinarium.

=== Reproductive physiology ===
Extant strepsirrhines have an epitheliochorial placenta, where the maternal blood does not come in direct contact with the fetal chorion like it does in the hemochorial placenta of haplorhines. The strepsirrhine uterus has two distinct chambers (bicornuate). Despite having similar gestation periods to comparably sized haplorhines, fetal growth rates are generally slower in strepsirrhines, which results in newborn offspring that are as little as one-third the size of haplorhine newborns. Extant strepsirrhines also have a lower basal metabolic rate, which elevates in females during gestation, putting greater demands on the mother.

Most primates have two mammary glands, but the number and positions vary between species within strepsirrhines. Lorises have two pairs, while others, like the ring-tailed lemur, have one pair on the chest (pectoral). The aye-aye also has two mammary glands, but they are located near the groin (inguinal). In females, the clitoris is sometimes enlarged and pendulous, resembling the male penis, which can make sex identification difficult for human observers. The clitoris may also have a bony structure in it, similar to the baculum (penis bone) in males. Most male primates have a baculum, but it is typically larger in strepsirrhines and usually forked at the tip.

== Behavior ==
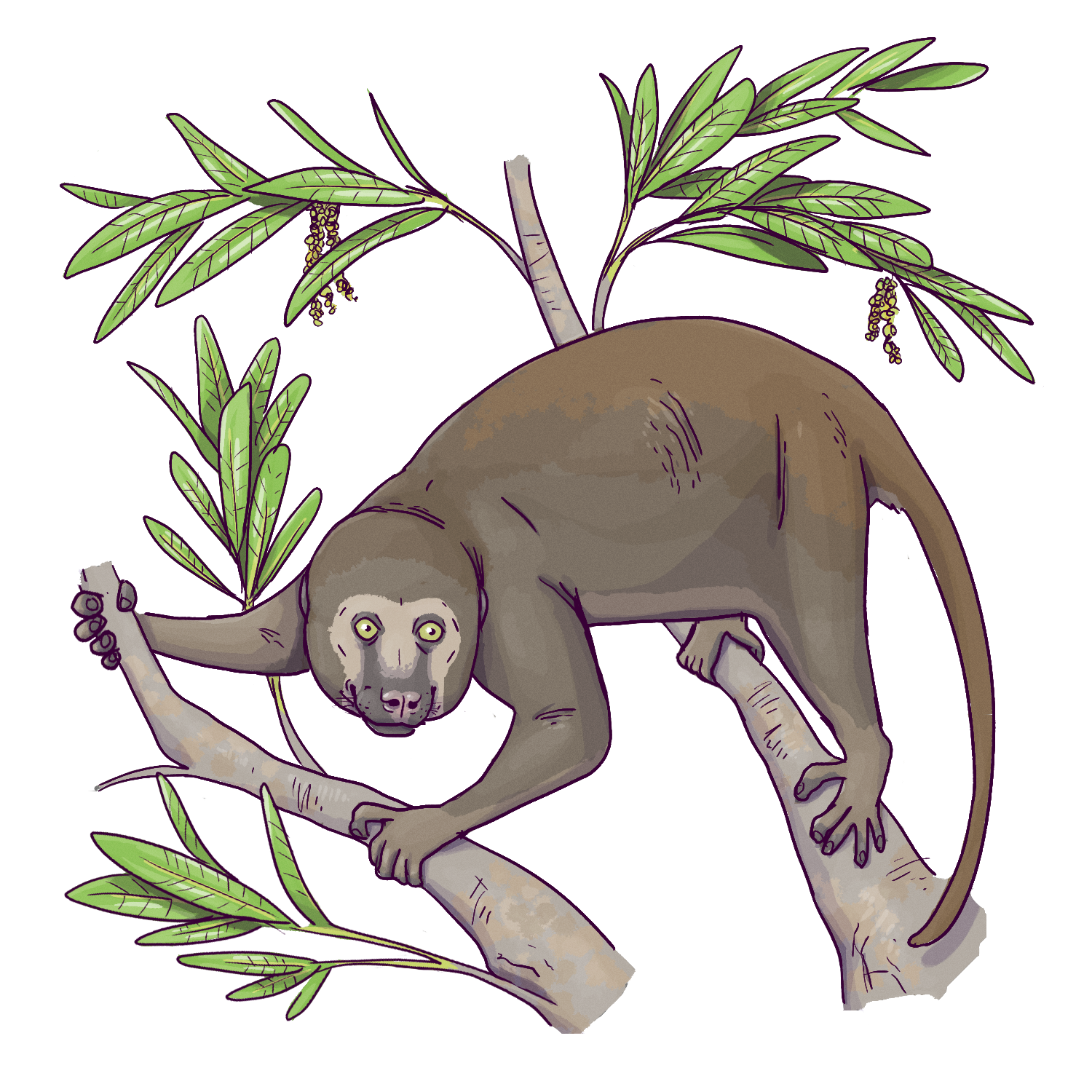
Restoration of the adapiform Adapis climbing between branches

Approximately three-quarters of all extant strepsirrhine species are nocturnal, sleeping in nests made from dead leaves or tree hollows during the day. All of the lorisoids from continental Africa and Asia are nocturnal, a circumstance that minimizes their competition with the simian primates of the region, which are diurnal. The lemurs of Madagascar, living in the absence of simians, are more variable in their activity cycles. The aye-aye, mouse lemurs, woolly lemurs, and sportive lemurs are nocturnal, while ring-tailed lemurs and most of their kin, sifakas, and indri are diurnal. Yet some or all of the brown lemurs (Eulemur) are cathemeral, which means that they may be active during the day or night, depending on factors such as temperature and predation.

Many extant strepsirrhines are well adapted for nocturnal activity due to their relatively large eyes; large, movable ears; sensitive tactile hairs; strong sense of smell; and the tapetum lucidum behind the retina. Among the adapiforms, most are considered diurnal, with the exception of Pronycticebus and Godinotia from Middle Eocene Europe, both of which had large orbits that suggest nocturnality.

Reproduction in most strepsirrhine species tends to be seasonal, particularly in lemurs. Key factors that affect seasonal reproduction include the length of the wet season, subsequent food availability, and the maturation time of the species. Like other primates, strepsirrhines are relatively slow breeders compared to other mammals. Their gestation period and interbirth intervals are usually long, and the young develop slowly, just like in haplorhine primates. Unlike simians, some strepsirrhines produce two or three offspring, although some produce only a single offspring. Those that produce multiple offspring tend to build nests for their young. These two traits are thought to be plesiomorphic (ancestral) for primates. The young are precocial (relatively mature and mobile) at birth, but not as coordinated as ungulates (hoofed mammals). Infant care by the mother is relatively prolonged compared to many other mammals, and in some cases, the infants cling to the mother's fur with their hands and feet.

Despite their relatively smaller brains compared to other primates, lemurs have demonstrated levels of technical intelligence in problem solving that are comparable to those seen in simians. However, their social intelligence differs, often emphasizing within-group competition over cooperation, which may be due to adaptations for their unpredictable environment. Although lemurs have not been observed using objects as tools in the wild, they can be trained to use objects as tools in captivity and demonstrate a basic understanding about the functional properties of the objects they are using.

=== Social systems and communication ===
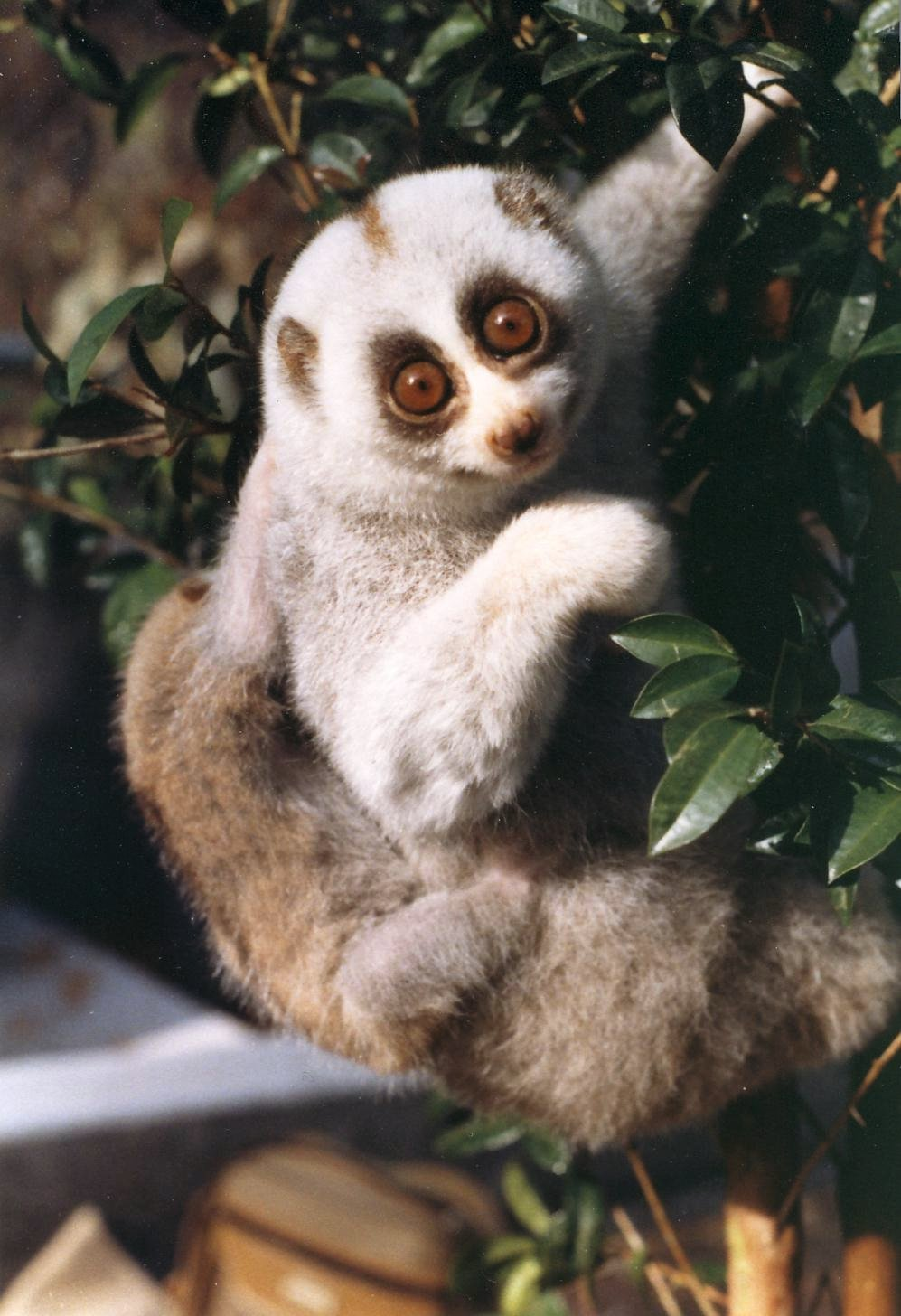
Like other primates, strepsirrhinid infants often cling to their mother's fur.

The nocturnal strepsirrhines have been traditionally described as "solitary", although this term is no longer favored by the researchers who study them. Many are considered "solitary foragers", but many exhibit complex and diverse social organization, often overlapping home ranges, initiating social contact at night, and sharing sleeping sites during the day. Even the mating systems are variable, as seen in woolly lemurs, which live in monogamous breeding pairs. Because of this social diversity among these solitary but social primates, whose level of social interaction is comparable to that of diurnal simians, alternative classifications have been proposed to emphasize their gregarious, dispersed, or solitary nature.

Among extant strepsirrhines, only the diurnal and cathemeral lemurs have evolved to live in multi-male/multi-female groups, comparable to most living simians. This social trait, seen in two extant lemur families (Indriidae and Lemuridae), is thought to have evolved independently. Group sizes are smaller in social lemurs than in simians, and despite the similarities, the community structures differ. Female dominance, which is rare in simians, is fairly common in lemurs. Strepsirrhines spend a considerable amount of time grooming each other (allogrooming). When lemuriform primates groom, they lick the fur and then comb it with their toothcomb. They also use their grooming claw to scratch places they cannot reach with their mouth.

Like New World monkeys, strepsirrhines rely on scent marking for much of their communication. This involves smearing secretions from epidermal scent glands on tree branches, along with urine and feces. In some cases, strepsirrhines may anoint themselves with urine (urine washing). Body postures and gestures may be used, although the long snout, non-mobile lips, and reduced facial enervation restrict the use of facial expressions in strepsirrhines. Short-range calls, long-range calls, and alarm calls are also used. Nocturnal species are more constrained by the lack of light, so their communication systems differ from those of diurnal species, often using long-range calls to claim their territory.

=== Locomotion ===
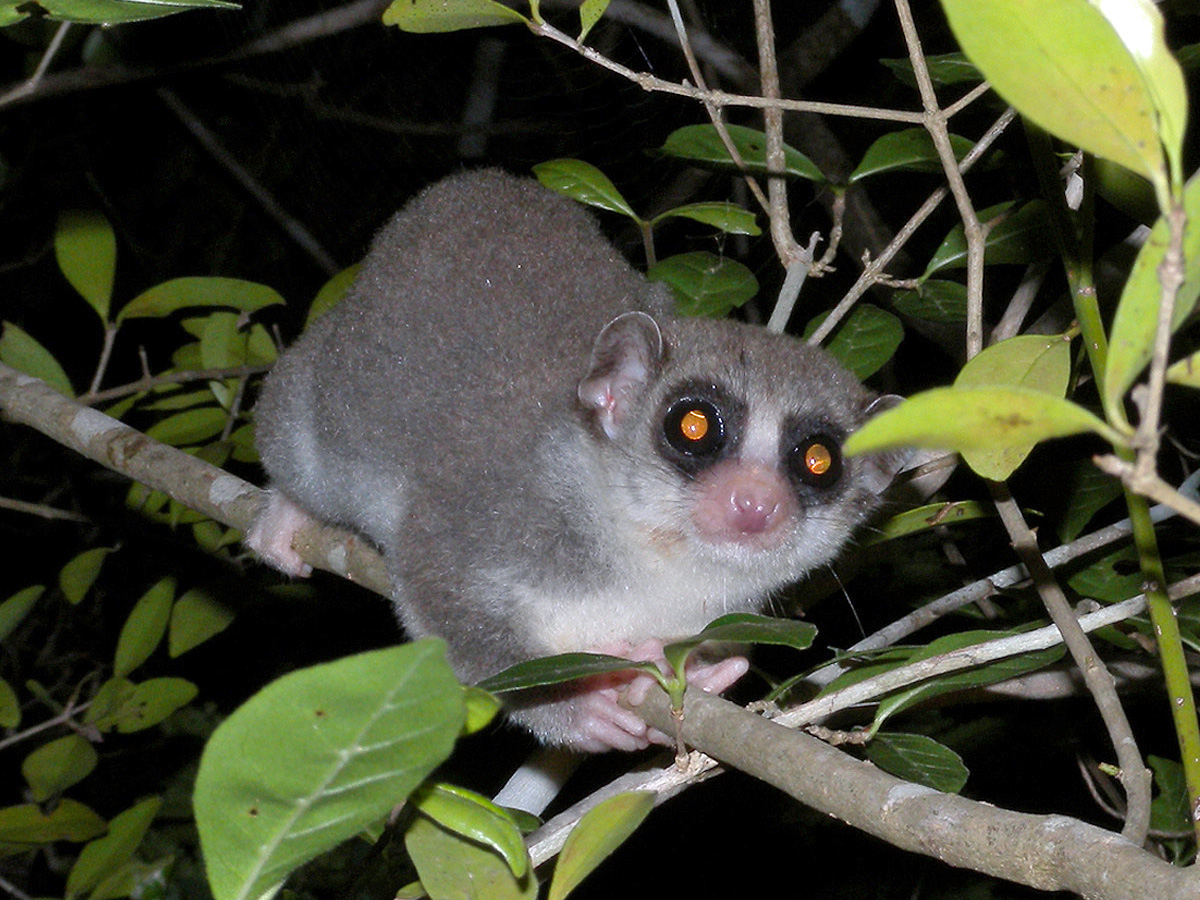
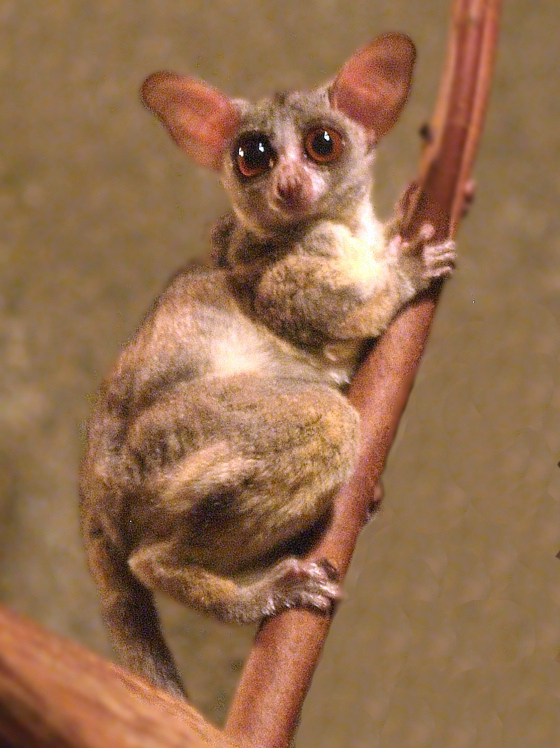
Dwarf lemurs (top) are arboreal quadrupeds while galagos (bottom) favor vertical clinging and leaping.

Living strepsirrhines are predominantly arboreal, with only the ring-tailed lemur spending considerable time on the ground. Most species move around quadrupedally (on four legs) in the trees, including five genera of smaller, nocturnal lemurs. Galagos, indriids, sportive lemurs, and bamboo lemurs leap from vertical surfaces, and the indriids are highly specialized for vertical clinging and leaping. Lorises are slow-moving, deliberate climbers.

Analyses of extinct adapiforms postcranial skeletons suggest a variety of locomotor behavior. The European adapids Adapis, Palaeolemur, and Leptadapis shared adaptations for slow climbing like the lorises, although they may have been quadrupedal runners like small New World monkeys. Both Notharctus and Smilodectes from North America and Europolemur from Europe exhibit limb proportions and joint surfaces comparable to vertical clinging and leaping lemurs, but were not as specialized as indriids for vertical clinging, suggesting that they ran along branches and did not leap as much. Notharctids Cantius and Pronycticebus appear to have been agile arboreal quadrupeds, with adaptations comparable to the brown lemurs.

=== Diet ===
Primates primarily feed on fruits (including seeds), leaves (including flowers), and animal prey (arthropods, small vertebrates, and eggs). Diets vary markedly between strepsirrhine species. Like other leaf-eating (folivorous) primates, some strepsirrhines can digest cellulose and hemicellulose. Some strepsirrhines, such as the galagos, slender lorises, and angwantibos, are primarily insectivorous. Other species, such as fork-marked lemurs and needle-clawed bushbabies, specialize on tree gum, while indriids, sportive lemurs, and bamboo lemurs are folivores. Many strepsirrhines are frugivores (fruit eaters), and others, like the ring-tailed lemur and mouse lemurs, are omnivores, eating a mix of fruit, leaves, and animal matter.

Among the adapiforms, frugivory seems to have been the most common diet, particularly for medium-sized to large species, such as Cantius, Pelycodus and Cercamonius. Folivory was also common among the medium and large-sized adapiforms, including Smilodectes, Notharctus, Adapis and Leptadapis. Sharp cusps on the teeth of some of the smaller adapiforms, such as Anchomomys and Donrussellia, indicate that they were either partly or primarily insectivorous.

== Distribution and habitat ==
The now extinct adapiform primates were primarily found across North America, Asia, and Europe, with a few species in Africa. They flourished during the Eocene when those regions were more tropical in nature, and they disappeared when the climate became cooler and drier. Today, the lemuriforms are confined in the tropics, ranging between 28° S to 26° N latitude. Lorises are found both in equatorial Africa and Southeast Asia, while the galagos are limited to the forests and woodlands of sub-Saharan Africa. Lemurs are endemic to Madagascar, although much of their diversity and habitat has been lost due to recent human activity.

As with nearly all primates, strepsirrhines typically reside in tropical rainforests. These habitats allow strepsirrhines and other primates to evolve diverse communities of sympatric species. In the eastern rainforests of Madagascar, as many as 11 or 12 species share the same forests, and prior to human arrival, some forests had nearly double that diversity. Several species of lemur are found in drier, seasonal forests, including the spiny forest on the southern tip of the island, although the lemur communities in these regions are not as rich.

== Conservation ==
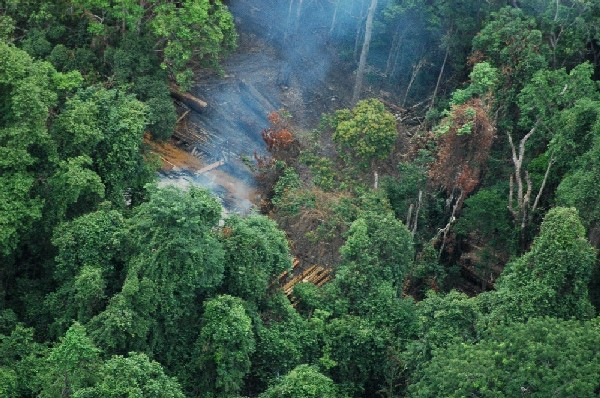
Strepsirrhines are threatened by deforestation in tropical regions.

Like all other non-human primates, strepsirrhines face an elevated risk of extinction due to human activity, particularly deforestation in tropical regions. Much of their habitat has been converted for human use, such as agriculture and pasture. The threats facing strepsirrhine primates fall into three main categories: habitat destruction, hunting (for bushmeat or traditional medicine), and live capture for export or local exotic pet trade. Although hunting is often prohibited, the laws protecting them are rarely enforced. In Madagascar, local taboos known as fady sometimes help protect lemur species, although some are still hunted for traditional medicine.

In 2012, the International Union for Conservation of Nature (IUCN) announced that lemurs were the "most endangered mammals", due largely to elevated illegal logging and hunting following a political crisis in 2009. In Southeast Asia, slow lorises are threatened by the exotic pet trade and traditional medicine, in addition to habitat destruction. Both lemurs and slow lorises are protected from commercial international trade under CITES Appendix I.
