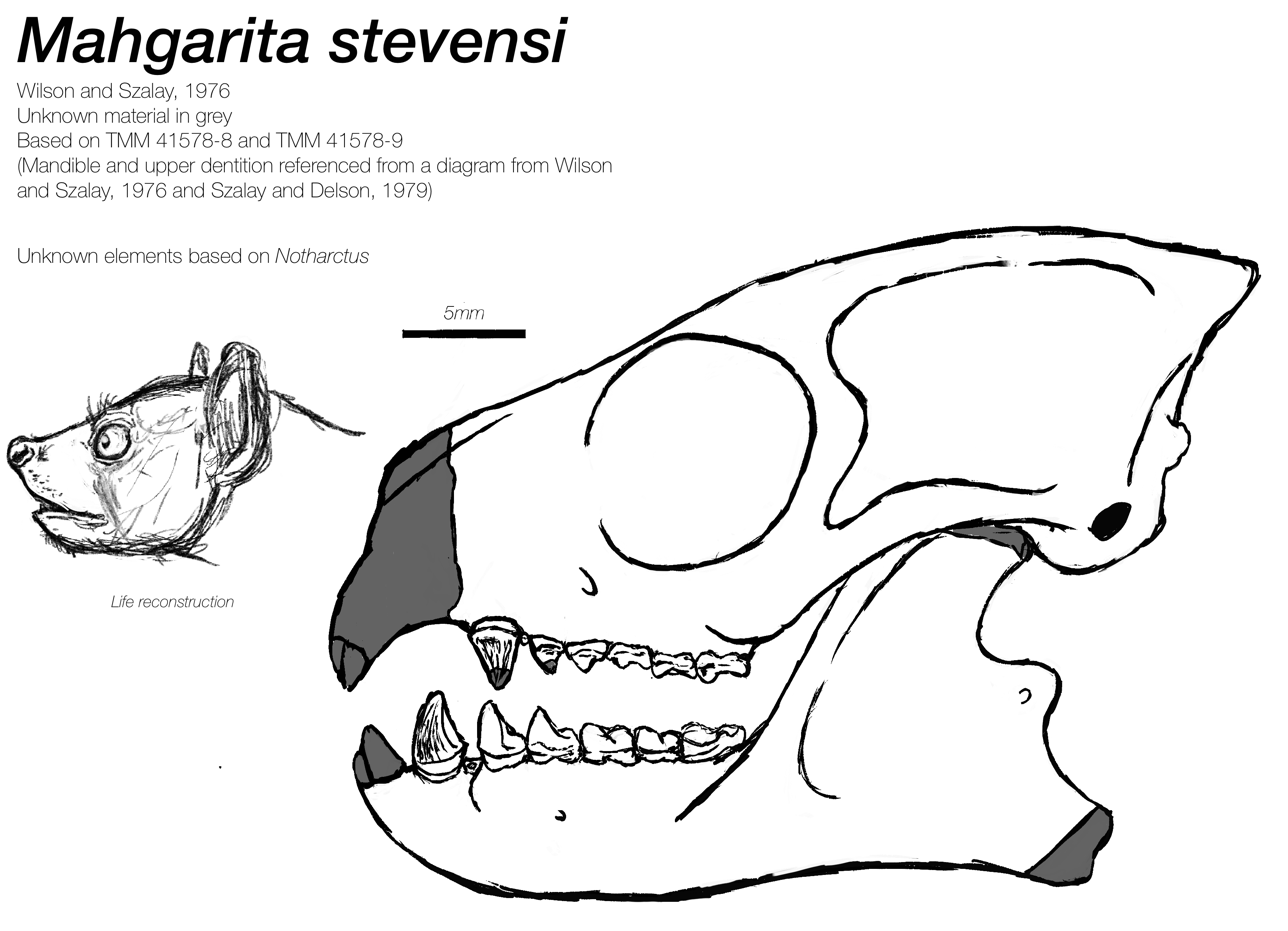
- Skull and life reconstruction of Mahgarita stevensi, based on the interpretation of the species as a notharctid.

Scientific classification
- Kingdom: Animalia
- Phylum: Chordata
- Class: Mammalia
- Order: Primates
- Suborder: Strepsirrhini
- Family: †Adapidae
- Genus: †Mahgarita; Wilson & Szalay, 1976
- Species: †M. stevensi

Binomial name
- †Mahgarita stevensi Wilson & Szalay, 1976

Synonyms
- Margarita stevensi Wilson & Szalay, 1976

= Mahgarita =

Mahgarita Temporal range: Late Eocene Uintan–Duchesnean

Extinct genus of primates

Mahgarita stevensi is a species of adapiform primate that lived in North America during the late Eocene. It is the only species of the genus Mahgarita. Fossils of the genus were found in the Duchesnean Laredo and Devil's Graveyard Formations of Texas.

== Taxonomy ==
The exact nature of the placement of Mahgarita is complicated, with many authors disagreeing on where the genus lies. Mahgarita has been placed within Adapidae, and further placed with the caenopithecines. Mahgarita has been suggested to be related to Europolemur on grounds of dental similarities. Mescalerolemur, also from Texas, is suggested to be the sister taxon to Mahgarita. The placement of Mahgarita as an adapoid has been questioned, with some suggesting Mahgarita is an early simian, though the traits used to classify Mahgarita as such may be homoplasies according to some authors. Other authors consider Mahgarita to be a notharctid.

Described in 1976, the original genus name given to the taxon was Margarita. This name had been used by an assortment of other organisms (including mollusks and mycetozoans), and so, according to the laws of the ICZN, Margarita was changed to Mahgarita. The genus was named after Margaret Skeels Stevens, a collector of Cenozoic fossils in Texas and discoverer of the fossils of Mahgarita.

== Description ==
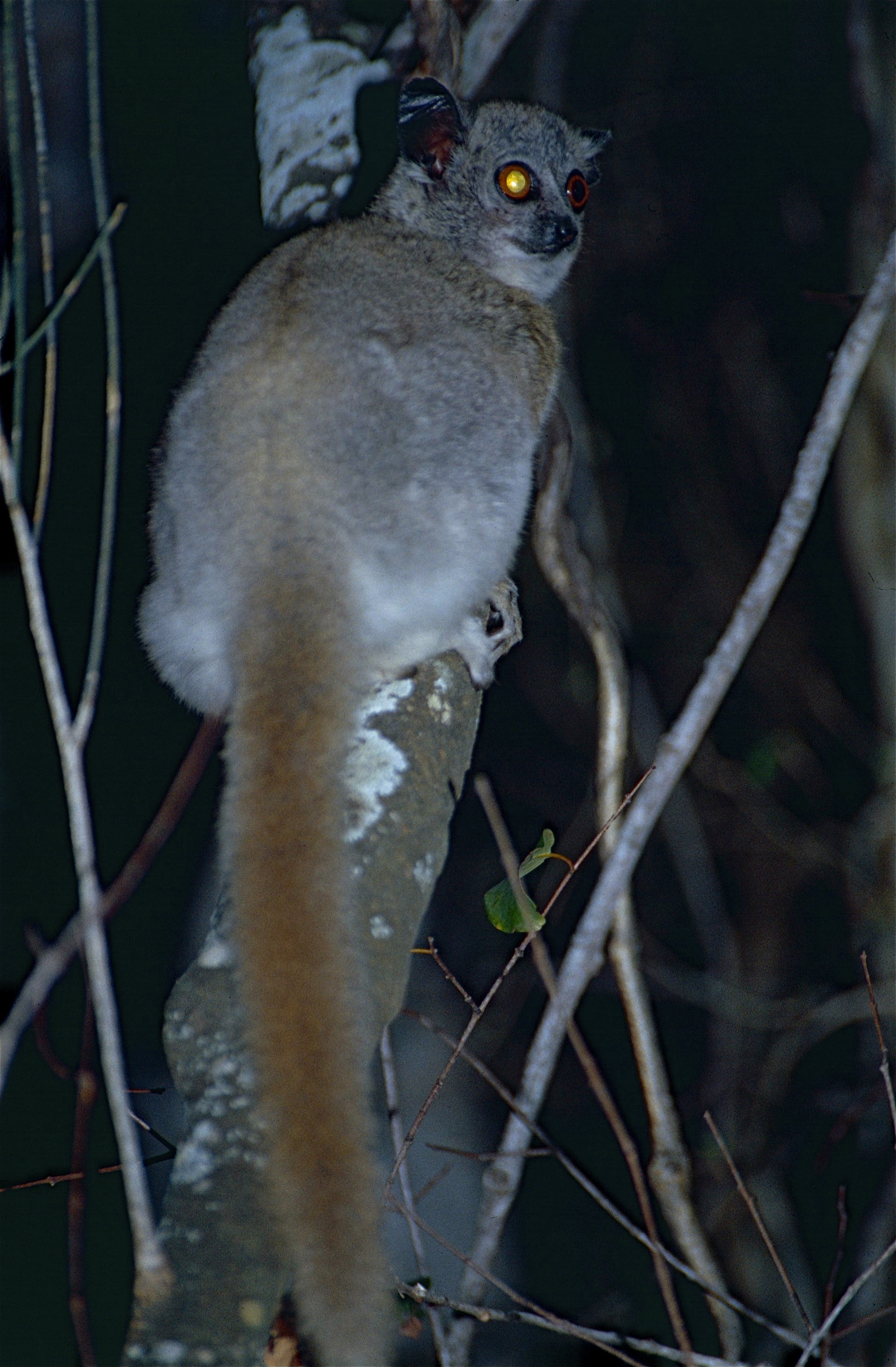
A modern day sportive lemur (Lepilemur leucopus), an extant strepsirrhine with a skull similar in size to Mahgarita.

Mahgarita is known from a crushed skull, as well as jaws and teeth. Unlike close relatives, Mahgarita has a completely reduced first premolar and a mostly reduced second premolar, resulting in a dental formula of 2.1.3.32.1.3.3. The anatomy of the premolars themselves is also unique, with the third premolar having an almost entirely reduced protocone, though it is still distinct. The mandible of Mahgarita is strongly fused, a derived trait seen in some other adapoids. The canines are similar to those in Europolemur, with them being sharply pointed and large.

The skull of Mahgarita is comparable in size to modern day sportive lemurs, and the morphology of the base of the skull is similar to that of Adapis.

== Paleoecology ==
=== Distribution ===
Known from Texas, Mahgarita is unique in that most other members of their subfamily are endemic to Eurasia. North America's own adapoid lineage, the notharctines, are not known from the same strata as Mahgarita, which suggests that fauna from Eurasia crossed into North America in middle Eocene. Mahgrita itself is endemic to Texas, and is found in Uintan and Duchesanean deposits such as Typee Canyon and the Devil's Graveyard Formation.

=== Paleobiology ===
Though postcranial material of Mahgarita is lacking, it is likely that the genus was arboreal, based on the anatomy of relatives.The teeth of the genus suggest it was insectivorous, rather than folivorous or frugivorous. Some authors disagree with this, saying tooth anatomy and body size (ranging from 700 g (1.5 lb) to 1,200 g (2.6 lb)) indicate it was folivorous.

=== Paleoenvironment ===
Late Eocene Texas had a cooler, wetter climate compared to other formations in Nebraska, Wyoming and the Dakotas. As such, Texas in the Uintan served as an area for Bridgerian taxa to persist within an increasingly fragmented environment. Mahgarita lived alongside various other vertebrates, including the brontothere Sthenodectes, the amynodontid Metamynodon, the hyracodontid Hyracodon and the hyaenodontid Hyaenodon. Mahgarita also coexisted with the omomyid primate Rooneyia.
