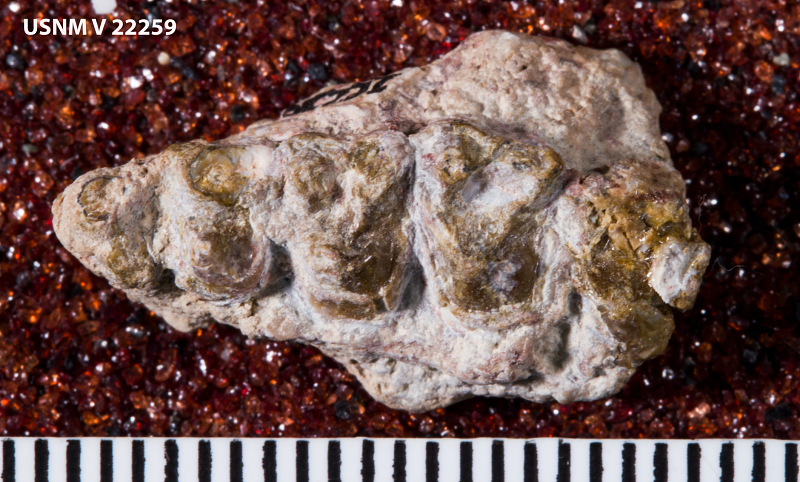
- Pelycodus jarrovii

Scientific classification
- Kingdom: Animalia
- Phylum: Chordata
- Class: Mammalia
- Infraclass: Placentalia
- Order: Primates
- Suborder: Strepsirrhini
- Family: †Notharctidae
- Subfamily: †Notharctinae
- Genus: †Pelycodus; Cope, 1875

Species
- †P. danielsae; †P. jarrovii

= Pelycodus =

Pelycodus Temporal range: 56.0–47.8 Ma Early Eocene

Extinct genus of primates

Pelycodus is an extinct genus of adapiform primate that lived during the early Eocene (Wasatchian) period in Europe and North America, particularly Wyoming and New Mexico. It is very closely related to Cantius and may even be its subgenus. It may also have given rise to the Middle Eocene Uintan primate Hesperolemur, although this is controversial. From mass estimates based on the first molar, the two species, P. jarrovii and P. danielsae, weighed 4.5 kg and 6.3 kg respectively and were frugivores with an arboreal, quadrupedal locomotion.

== History ==
Pelycodus was first identified as Prototomus jarrovii by Cope in 1874, who pronounced it a rare inhabitant of both Wyoming and New Mexico. Over the next hundred years, approximately a dozen species were added, most more primitive dentally than the now renamed Pelycodus jarrovii. In 1977, all but two species were moved into Cantius by Philip D. Gingerich on the basis of differences in their molars. There is some disagreement as to whether Pelycodus is distinct enough to be a separate genus.

== Morphology ==
Pelycodus is placed within adapiforms because of its annular ectotympanic, small eyes, non-elongated tarsus and numerous premolar and molar crests and within Notharctinae because of its four premolars, unfused mandible, a hypocone derived from the postprotocingulum and a lacrimal bone within the orbit.

There is, however, a great deal of individual variation in the dentition of Pelycodus, which has made it hard to differentiate between Pelycodus and Cantius species. Distinguishing features of the Cantius/Pelycodus clade are the comparatively smaller hypocones and mesostyles. The distinguishing features of Pelycodus from Cantius are its anteroposteriorly compressed trigonid, its small paraconid on M_{2} and lack of hypoconulid on M_{1-2}. It has a much better developed hypocone and mesostyle than many species of Cantius, but not quite as developed as Notharctus. The shape of the molars indicates that Pelycodus, like Cantius and unlike later folivorous Notharctines such as Notharctus and Smilodectes, was most likely a frugivore, though perhaps not as strictly as Cantius. However, there is almost no difference between the tarsal bones of the earliest Cantius and latest Pelycodus, indicating that their arboreal, quadrupedal locomotion was probably primitive. Only with later Notharctines was there a shift toward more lemur-like locomotion with longer hindlimbs, trunks and tails, perhaps related to the shift in diet.

== Phylogeny ==
It is very well demonstrated that chronologically successive lineages of Cantius grew progressively larger mesostyles and hypocones, eventually gaining enough distinction dentally to be placed in the genus Pelycodus. This is one of the best stratophenetic sequences in the Eocene, and is supporting evidence for gradualism in evolution. However, even though this well documented fossil sequence appears linear, it probably is an underestimation of the diversity of these genera. It is not certain which, if any, lineages Pelycodus gave rise to. Some authors have suggested that it is closely related to Notharctus, while others have argued that its size already exceeded that of primitive Notharctus and therefore was not the most parsimonious phylogeny. These scientists either link Pelycodus with the poorly known Hesperolemur or place it as a terminating branch.
