= Mission Valley Formation =

Geologic formation in San Diego County

- Stratigraphic range: Paleogene
- Type: Geologic formation
- Underlies: Pomerado Conglomerate
- Overlies: Stadium Conglomerate
- Thickness: 0–60 metres (0–197 ft)

Lithology
- Primary: sandstone

Location
- Region: San Diego County, California
- Country: United States

Type section
- Named for: Mission Valley, San Diego

The Mission Valley Formation is a marine sandstone geologic formation in the Mission Valley region of southwestern San Diego County, California.

== Geology ==
The formation's sandstone characteristics are: soft and friable, light olive gray, fine to medium grained, and composed mostly of quartz and potassium feldspar. The Mission Valley Formation thins from the west to the east, with a maximum thickness of 0–60 metres (0–197 ft).

It overlies the Stadium Conglomerate formation and underlies the Pomerado Conglomerate formation.

== Fossil content ==
It preserves fossils dating back to the Paleogene period of the Cenozoic Era. The formation's rocks can contain a molluscan fauna in the western and central exposures and a land-mammal fauna in the eastern exposures.

=== Mammals ===
==== Eulipotyphlans ====
Eulipotyphlans reported from the Mission Valley Formation
Genus	Species	Presence	Material	Notes	Images
Proterixoides	P. davisi		Several calcaneums, astragali and a navicular.		

==== Ferae ====
Ferae reported from the Mission Valley Formation
Genus	Species	Presence	Material	Notes	Images
Ceruttia	C. sandiegoensis	"SDSNH locality 4888, State Road 125 North (Unit II, Mid Brown Siltstone)".	SDSNH 92504 and SDSNH 92503.	A carnivoraform.	
cf. 'Miacis'	cf. 'M.' hookwayi	SDSNH locality 4715, State Route 125 Grossmont.	SDSNH 84969 "right dentary fragment with p2, m1, and m2".	A miacid.	
Procynodictis	P. progressus	SDSNH locality 3870, Scripps Ranch North Site 70.	"SDSNH 54413 (left dentary fragment with p2-m2); SDSNH 54414 (right dentary fragment with m1-2); SDSNH 54416 (left maxillary fragment with P4-M1)".	A miacid.	

==== Primatomorphs ====
Primatomorphs reported from the Mission Valley Formation
Genus	Species	Presence	Material	Notes	Images
Hemiacodon	H. sp.	V-72157.	Isolated fragmentary teeth.	An omomyid, most similar to H. gracilis.	
?Macrotarsius	?M. sp.	V-72150 & V-73138.	Isolated molars.	An omomyid also known from the Friars Formation, closely similar to M. jepseni.	
Microsyops	M. sp. cf. M. annectens	V-72158.	Isolated & fragmentary molar (UCMP 101619).	A microsyopid.	
Notharctus	N. sp.	V-72157.	Damaged isolated molar (UCMP 113256).	A notharctine similar to N. robustior.	
Omomys	O. powayensis	V-71180, V-72157 & V-72158.	Teeth.	An omomyid also known from the Friars Formation.	
Pelycodus	P. sp.	V-73138.	Maxillary fragment (UCMP 113210).	A notharctine.	
Uintasorex	U. montezumicus	V-71180, V-71211, V-72157, V-72158, V-72176, V-72177, V-72179, V-73138 & V-73139.	Isolated teeth.	A microsyopid also known from the Friars Formation.	
Walshina	W. esmaraldensis	SDSNH localities 3426 and 4020.	Teeth.	An omomyid also known from the Sespe & Santiago formations.	
Washakius	W. woodringi	V-71211, V-72157, V-72158, V-72176, V-72179 & V-73138.	Teeth & jaw elements.	An omomyid also known from the Friars Formation.	

== See also ==
- Geology of San Diego County, California
- Paleogene Period in California
- List of fossiliferous stratigraphic units in California
- Paleontology in California
