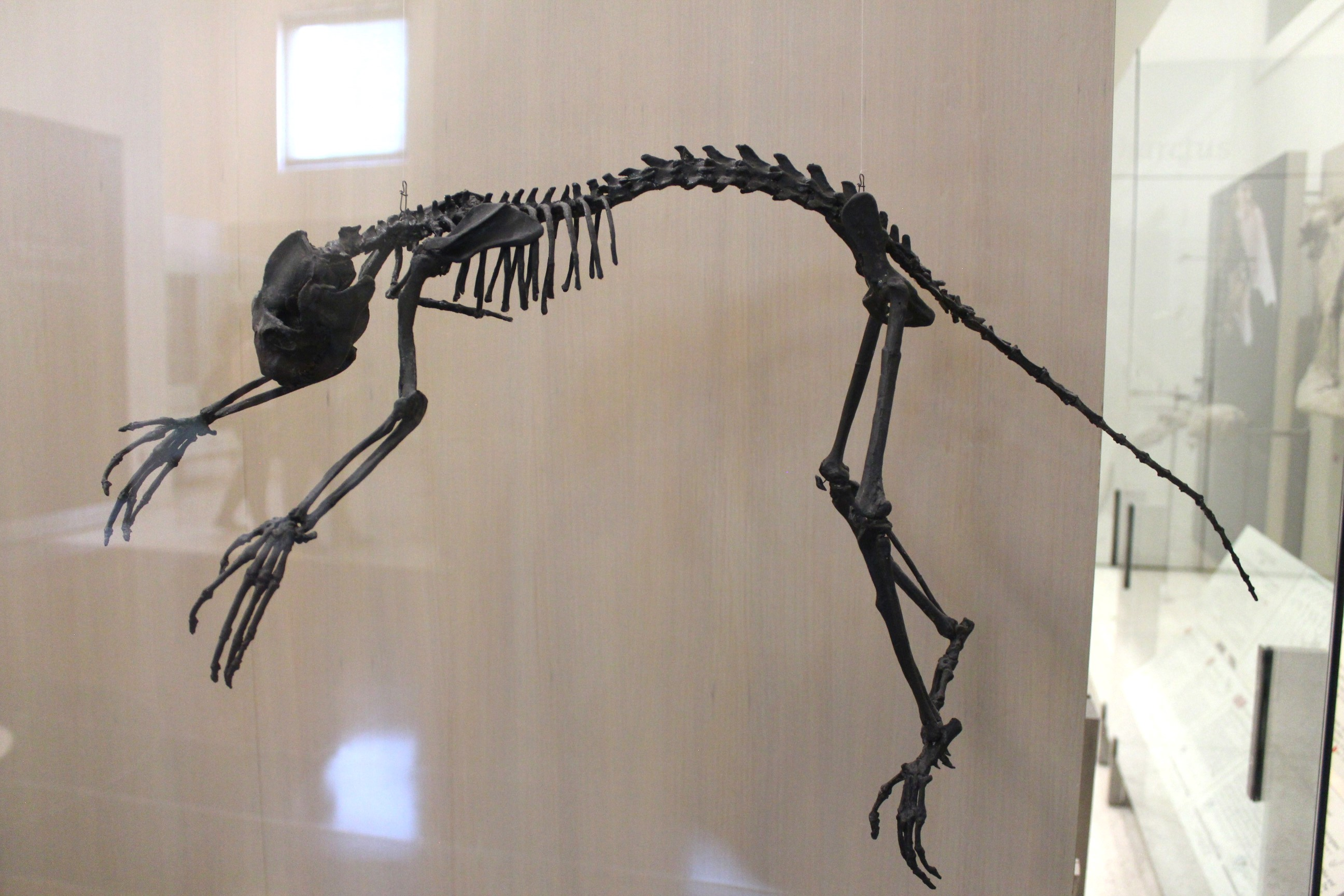
- Notharctus tenebrosus

Scientific classification
- Kingdom: Animalia
- Phylum: Chordata
- Class: Mammalia
- Order: Primates
- Suborder: Strepsirrhini
- Family: †Notharctidae
- Subfamily: †Notharctinae
- Genus: †Notharctus; Leidy, 1870

Species
- †N. pugnax Granger and Gregory 1917; †N. robustiorLeidy 1872; †N. tenebrosusLeidy 1870; †N. venticolus; Osborn 1902: †N. robinsoni Gingerich 1979

Synonyms
- Hipposyus Leidy 1872; Limnotherium Marsh 1871; Telmalestes Marsh 1872; Thinolestes Marsh 1872; Tomitherium Cope 1872; Synonyms of N. tenebrosus: Limnotherium tyrannus Marsh, 1871; Hipposyus formosus Leidy, 1872; Tomitherium rostratum Cope, 1872; Thinolestes anceps Marsh, 1872; Limnotherium affine Marsh, 1872; Notharctus osborni Granger and Gregory, 1917; Synonyms of N. robustior: Telmatolestes crassus Marsh, 1872

= Notharctus =

Notharctus Temporal range: Early-Mid Eocene (Wasatchian-Uintan) ~50.3–45 Ma

Extinct genus of primates

Notharctus is a genus of adapiform primate that lived in North America during the early to middle Eocene. Known from many geologic formations, including the Bridger Basin and the Devil's Graveyard Formation, Notharctus was wide-ranging throughout North America.

The genus contains at least 4 species. Notharctus is among the first known fossil primates from North America, with the first fossil being collected by Joseph Leidy from the Fort Bridger Basin in 1870. Notharctus has a long classification history involving frequent reassessment and assignment to various mammal groups, including the obsolete Pachydermata and the Mesodonta. Notharctus belonged to an extinct primate group known as Adapiformes.

Adapiform primates were among the first primates to exhibit a set of adaptations for life in the trees, such as grasping hands, binocular vision, and flexible backs. In addition to this, small orbits in the genera indicate that they were diurnal. The diet of Notharctus was likely leaves, and the genus moved similarly to modern day lemurs in life. The fingers of the genus were elongated for clamping onto branches, including the development of a thumb. Its spine is flexible and Notharctus was about 40 centimetres (16 in) in length, excluding the long tail. Notharctus was relatively large for an early primate, with a maximum weight of 6.9 kg (15 lb) being estimated for one species. The genus exhibits sexual dimorphism of the canines and developments of the brain which indicates it relied less on smell than other earlier primates.

Notharctines, including Notharcus, are thought to have gone extinct during the Uintan stage of the middle Eocene due to a cooling climate.

== Taxonomy ==
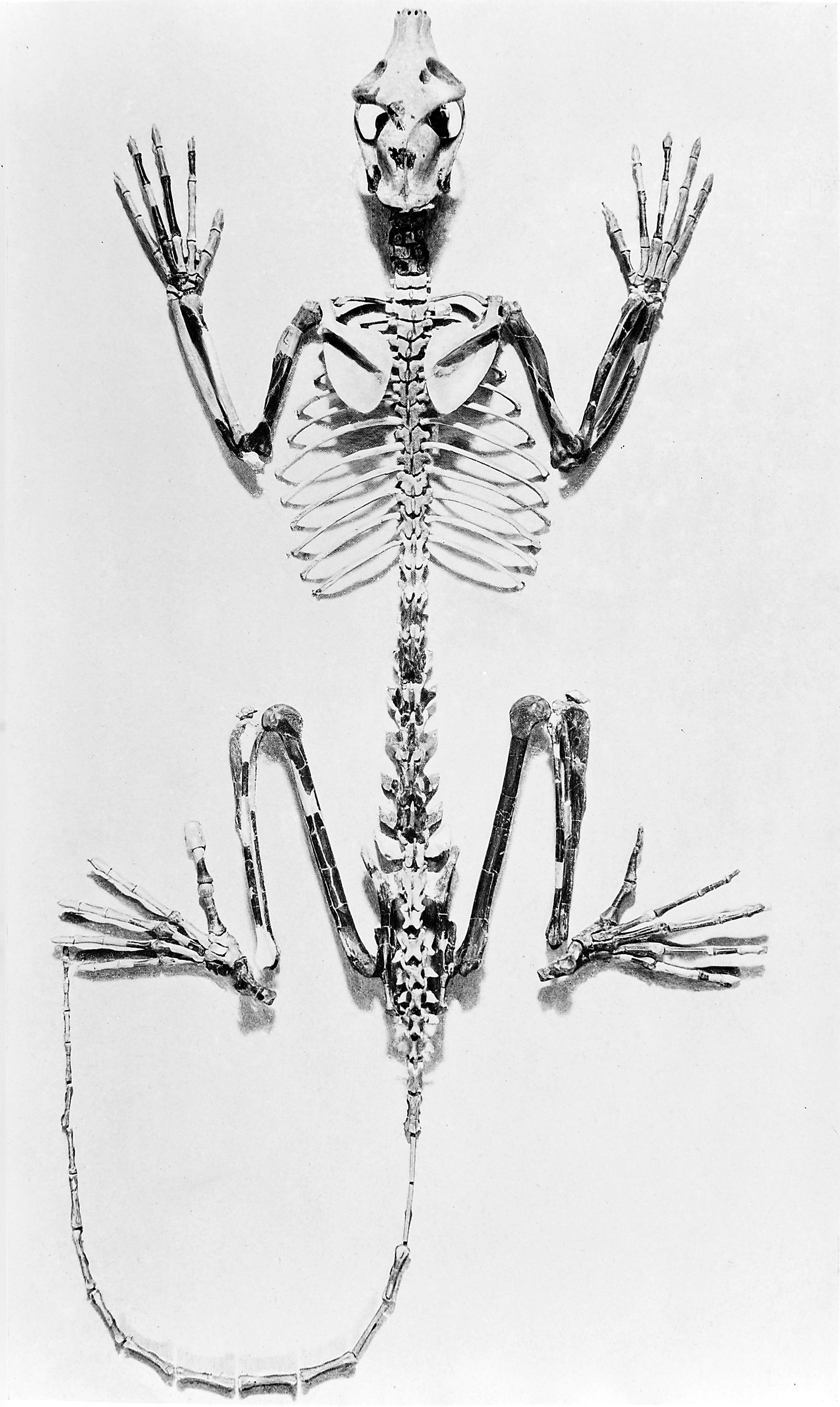
Notharctus tenebrosus from William K. Gregory's 1920 monograph on the anatomy of the genus

Notharctus is currently grouped within the Notharctidae, though it has been historically considered an adapid. Within the Notharctidae, Notharctus is considered within the subfamily Notharctinae. Notharctus as a genus is sometimes considered the sister taxon (or even a direct descendant) of Cantius, though other researchers consider Cantius to be ancestral to all notharctines. The name of the genus is derived from the Latin "noth", meaning spurious, and the Greek "arctos", meaning bear.

=== History of research ===
Notharctus was one of the first discovered fossil primates from North America. The type species, Notharctus tenebrosus, was discovered by Joseph Leidy in 1870 from the Fort Bridger Basin, who had difficulties assigning it to any specific group of mammals, noting similarities in its jaw anatomy to carnivorans and to "pachyderms". Leidy opted to refer Notharctus to the pachyderms, but remarked in his description of the genus that the jawbone was incredibly anatomically similar to modern platyrrhine monkeys. This similarity was also noted by Othniel Charles Marsh, who compared the jaw to Hyopsodus. Marsh assigned these remains to the genus Limnotherium, then later he found more remains which he described as Thinolestes.

Marsh found limb bones in October of 1872, which shared similarities with lemurs, causing him to assign the genus to the Quadrumana (an obsolete classification including all non-human primates). In 1876, Edward Drinker Cope proposed Notharctus and Pelycodus belonged to a new order, the Mesodonta, due to the fact that Pelycodus had been associated historically with creodont claws. This order acted as an "intermediate" between creodonts and prosimians, according to Cope. Cope later in 1885 considered Notharctus a lemuroid, yet he still considered the lemuroids close to the obsolete Insectivora and Condylarthra. In 1895, Karl Alfred von Zittel continued this error, referring Notharctus alongside Pelycodus, Microsyops and Hyopsodus within the Pachylemuridae.

Notharctus was then later grouped within Adapis by Jacob Wortman in 1904 and Schlosser in 1887, who presumed the mesodonts were a polyphyletic assemblage. Wortman referred this group to the Neopithecini, a group also including simians but not lemurs. Henry Fairfield Osborn agreed with the classification of Notharctus as a primate, grouping Notharctus closely to Pelycodus in 1902, yet he still retained usage of the suborder Mesodonta, which united the Hyopsidontidae, the Notharctidae and the Anaptomorphidae. The family Notharctus was assigned to was given 2 names, with Marsh proposing Limnotheridae in 1875 while Osborn proposed Notharctidae in 1902. With Walter W. Granger's discovery of a nearly complete skeleton, also in Wyoming, it was firmly established as a primate. William King Gregory, in 1915, proposed that Adapis was a direct descendant of Notharctus, an idea first proposed by Schlosser. In 1917, Granger and Gregory published a revision of the genus, and in 1920 Gregory published a monograph which outlined the classification history and anatomy of Notharctus. Gregory considered Notharctus a lemuriform, rather than an adapiform (a grouping which did not exist at the time).

== Description ==
Notharctus is one of the best represented adapiform primates, with the postcranial and cranial morphology being well known. Notharctus is distinguished from other fossil primates by its stout jaws, typically fused mandible, and quadrate molars with a pronounced hypocone (a type of cusp on the molar which assists with grinding) and mesostyle (an intermediate cusp on the molar). The different species of Notharctus have been estimated at different sizes, with N. robustior estimated to weigh 6.9 kg (15 lb) while N. tenebrosus has been estimated to weigh 4.2 kg (9.3 lb). The postcranial anatomy of Notharctus has been described as similar to modern day platyrrhines.

=== Crania ===
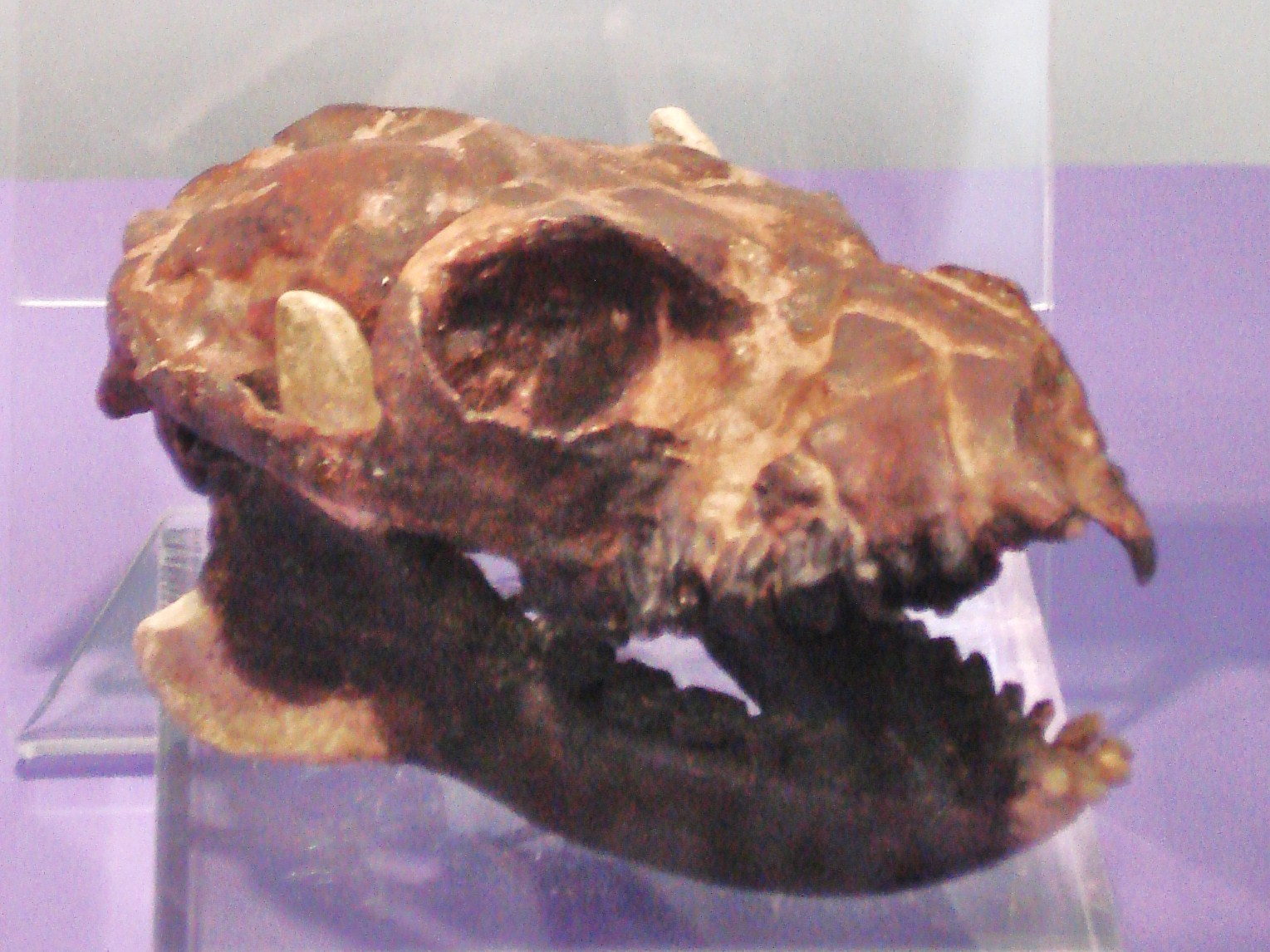
Skull of N. tenebrosus

==== Skull ====
Notharctus has a small braincase compared to Lepilemur, which is considered the most basal living lemur. The snout is moderately long, with a long premaxillary bone, which is contrasted by a shortened jaw. Notharctus had a reduced lacrimal bone that was positioned at the end of the orbit but not anterior to it. The sagittal and nuchal crests of the genus are large, similar to other adapids (though not as large as those in Adapis). Behind the orbits there is a notable constriction, which suggests a smaller brain size than the related Smilodectes. Despite this, Notharctus had both a larger and narrower skull. The occipital bone is narrow and pointed. On the petromastoid there is a prominent tuberosity. In Notharctus, much like other adapids, the external pterygoid is joined with the bulla. The postglenoid foramen is prominent, another trait shared by other adapids. The skull of N. robustior is larger than that of N. tenebrosus, and the sagittal and nuchal crests are larger as well. The infraorbital foramen of Notharctus is larger than those of modern-day lemurs, and is closest to Cantius in size. The basioccipital portion of the skull is short, a trait shared by Adapis. The zygomatic arches are stout, and the masseter muscle has been suggested in life, by some authors, to bulge and press the jaw inward, similar to modern carnivorans and insectivorans.

==== Mandible ====
The shape of the mandible of Notharctus is more robust than those of modern lemurs, though it is still more gracile than those of anthropoids. The mandibular symphysis of Notharctus is typically fused, though in some specimens they are not entirely coossified. The mandible is suggested to have fused later in life. The condyloid process is shaped similarly to a bean, according to some authors, and the concave side of the condyle is positioned posteriorly. The coronoid process is enlarged and extended vertically, which acts as an attachment site for the temporalis muscle. The attachment sites for the masseter muscle, however, are smaller than in Adapis. The attachment site for the geniohyoid muscle too differs in Notharctus and Adapis, with Notharctus lacking a notable rim surrounding the pits following the mandibular symphysis.

==== Endocasts ====
Endocasts have been made of Notharctus, with the anatomy of the olfactory bulbs suggesting that Notharctus relied less on smell than earlier plesiadapids. Different estimates for body weight suggest Notharctus had an encephalization quotient either lower or equal to that of Smilodectes.

==== Dentition ====
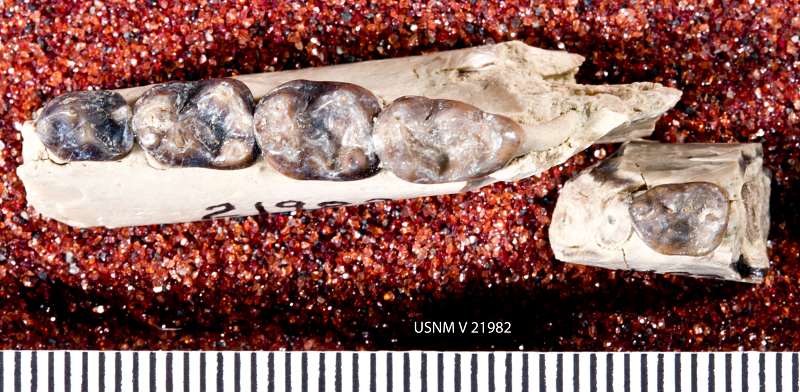
The teeth of N. rubustior

The adult dental formula of Notharctus is 2.1.4.32.1.4.3 × 2 = 40. The molar teeth of Notharctus have well-developed shearing crests, while the incisors are peg-like in form. The canine teeth were enlarged compared to other adapids. Unlike modern lemurids, the premolars are not caniniform. The anatomy of the incisors and canine teeth has been compared to indrids and lemurids. The first premolar is reduced and, in the upper jaw, single rooted. The upper molars of this species have a pseudohypocone. The hypocones of the teeth are strong and cuspate, with strong cingulae surrounding the teeth. Specifics of the teeth have been used historically to differentiate species of Notharctus, as the dentition of primates is distinctive. The canines of Notharctus have been suggested to be sexually dimorphic. The roots of these supposed "male" canines are large, and the crown is pointed. In contrast, the supposed "female" canines have a canine that closer resembles the premolars.

Deciduous teeth are known in some specimens of Notharctus, with the last milk molar resembling a molar far more than the fourth premolar, a trait typical to most mammals.

=== Postcranial skeleton ===
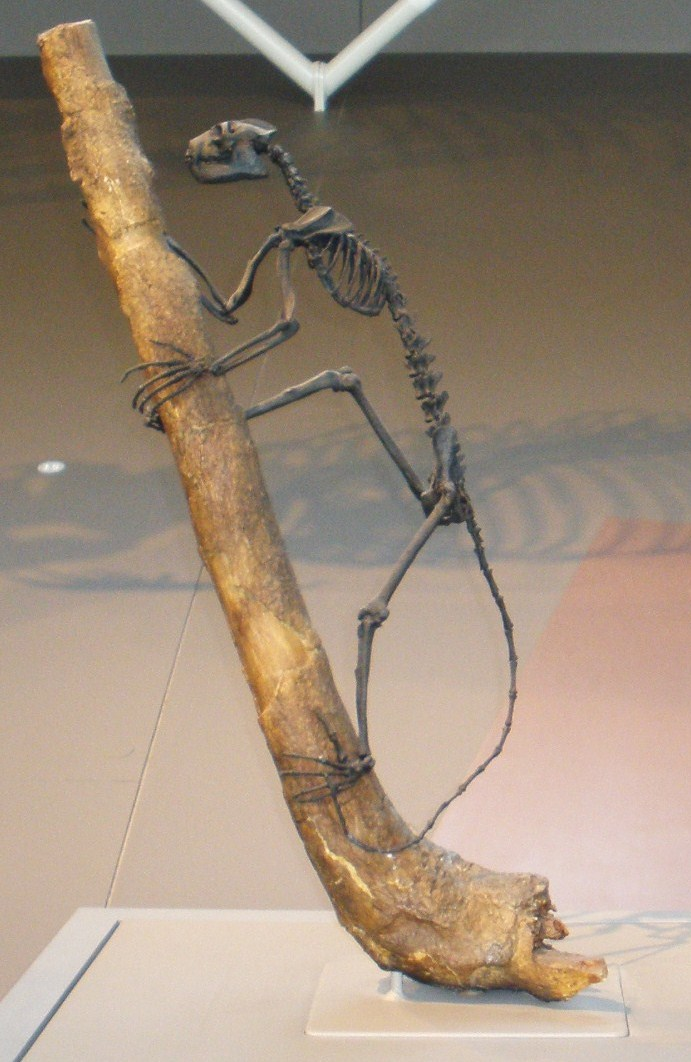
Skeletal mount of Notharctus tenebrosus

==== Vertebral column ====
The vertebral formula of Notharctus tenebrosus is 7 cervicals, 12 thoracics, 8 lumbars, 3 sacrals, and 19+ caudals. The thorax is long and deep. In life, Notharctus was likely pronograde in posture, similar to modern lemurs. The same can be said for the general postcranial anatomy, which has been compared to Propithecus and Lemur.

==== Forelimbs ====
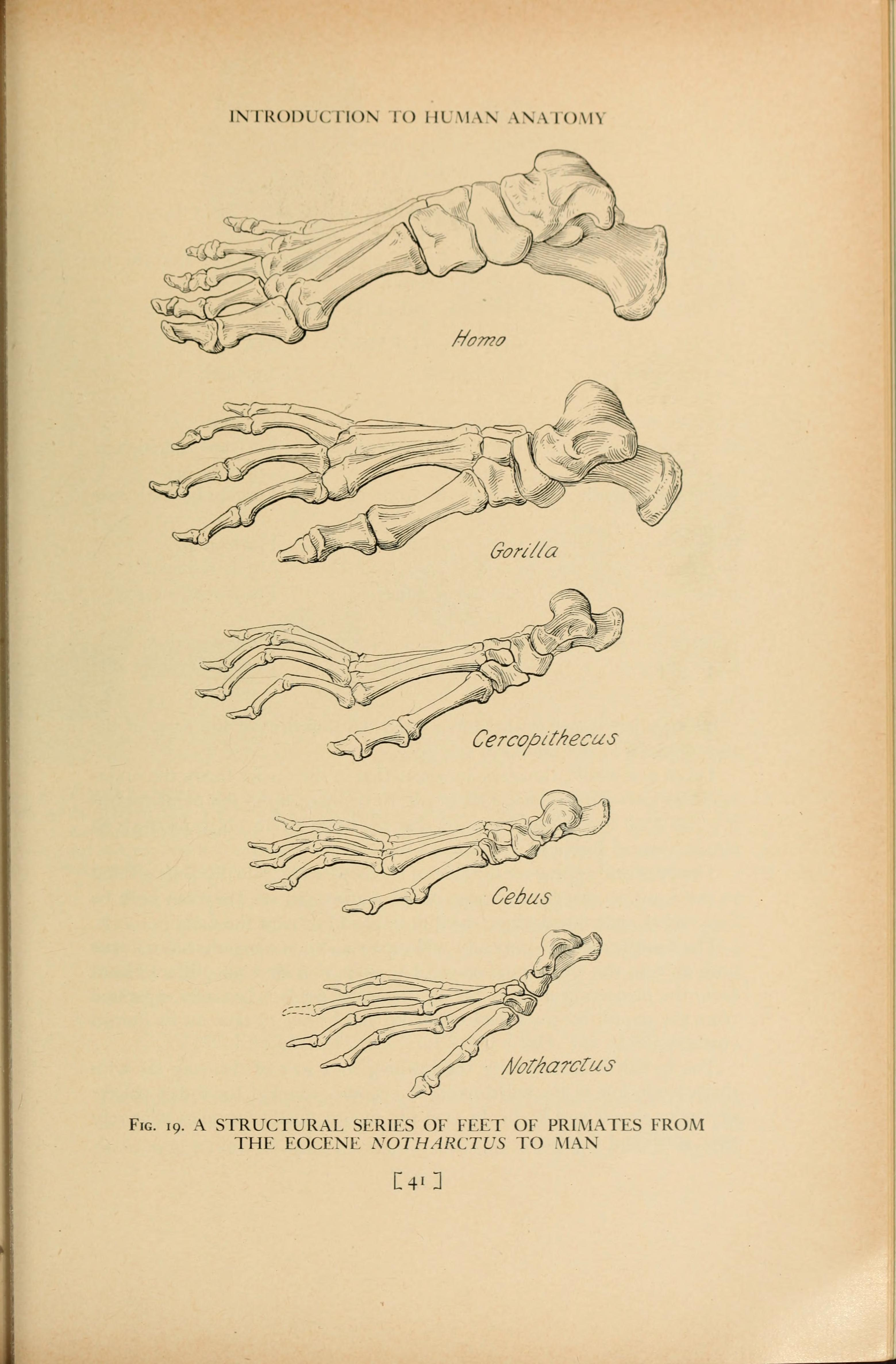
Comparison of the feet of other primates with Notharctus (bottom)

On the hands and feet, the pollex and hallux are large and opposable, and the fingers and toes are long and possess nails. The characteristics of the carpals (and the manus as a whole) of Notharctus are primitive. The humerus of Notharctus has been compared to those of both modern lemurs and modern platyrrhine monkeys, with the S shaped contour being similarly developed as in Alouatta. The entepicondylar foramen is prominent, and the head of the humerus is inclined posteriorly. The humerus itself is short, and the trochlea is not grooved. The anatomy of the forelimb bones suggest Notharctus had a large brachioradialis muscle. The features of both the radius and ulna, as well as the scapula, and clavicle, are also similar to those of platyrrhines, though comparisons have also been made with those of indrids and lemurids. The scapula is widened at the base and the coracoid process is similar in shape and size to Lepilemur. The scapular head has a rugose texture.

==== Hindlimbs ====
The hind limbs of Notharctus are long, and the ilium is sickle shaped and the ischium is elongate. The femoral head is small and not as globular as modern strepsirrhines. Compared to the humerus, the humero-femoral ratio of Notharctus tenebrosus is .60. The fibula is sharply curved, as is the tibia. The tibia is robust, and there is a tuberosity on the front face of the tibia, which is enlarged compared to modern lemurs. As in other adapiformes and lemuriformes, the shape of the posterior trochlear shelf alongside the presence of a projection on the talus allows for a more flexible positioning and support during leaping. The calcaneus is relatively short, and the posterior trochlear shelf is larger than in modern lemuriformes. In general, the anatomy of the tarsus is less rigid than in modern-day lemurs. There is evidence that the genus had a type of grooming claw, thought to be an intermediate between a grooming claw and a nail. The anatomy of the grooming claw differs from the grooming claws in present-day strepsirrhines, with the distinguishing feature being an enlarged cervical nutrient foramen.

== Paleoecology ==
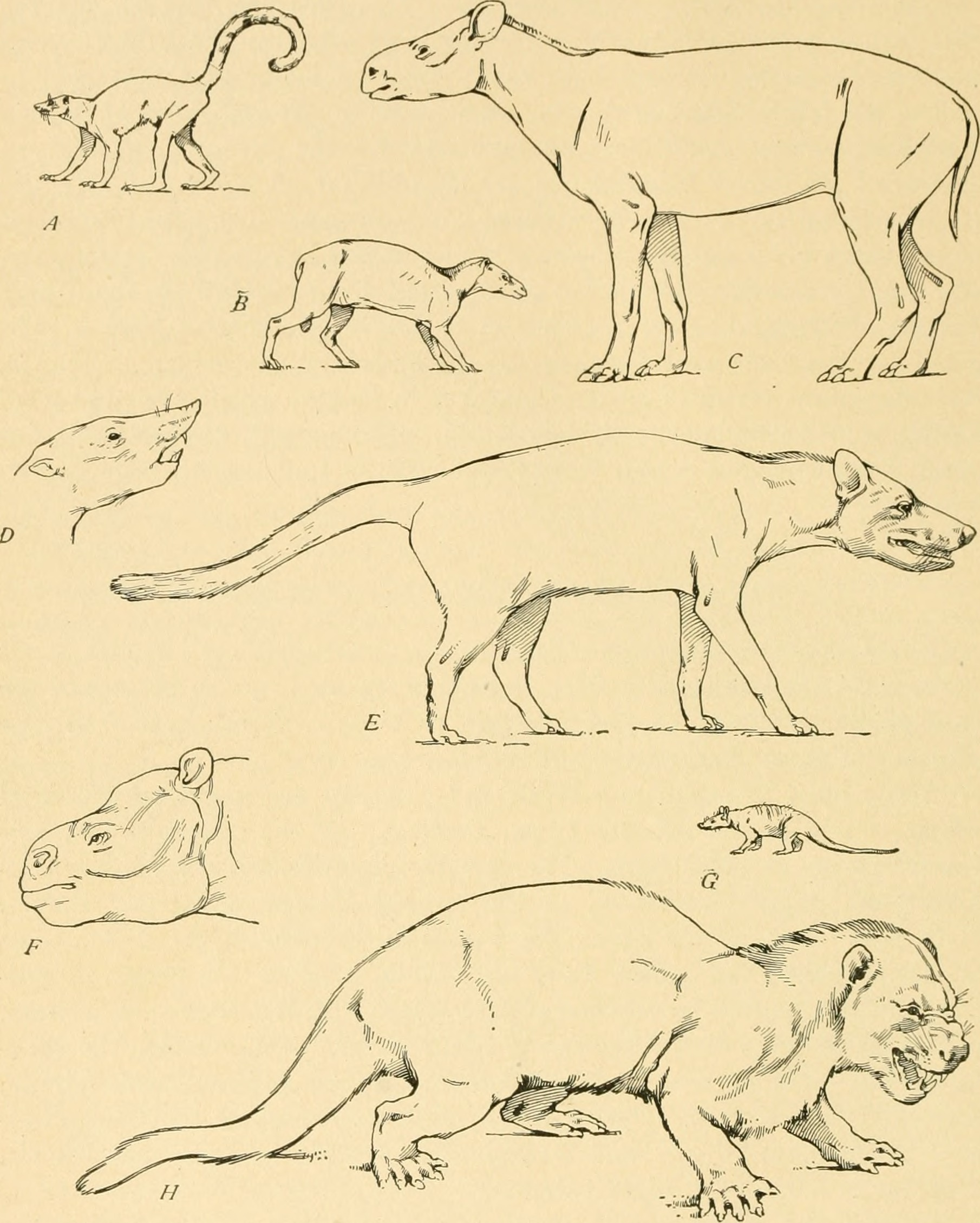
Illustration of Notharctus (top left) with other contemporaneous Eocene fauna. Taxa are: A: Notharctus B:Orohippus C: Hyrachyus D: Trogosus E: Synoplotherium F: Palaeosyops G: Metacheiromys H: Patriofelis

=== Paleobiology ===
Based on dental morphology, research of the molar enamel and the presence of a partially fused mandibular symphysis, Notharctus most likely had a folivorous diet. This is contradicted by other aspects of the dental anatomy, which suggest the genus may have been frugivorous. The anatomy of the orbits of Notharctus suggest it was diurnal rather than nocturnal.

Based upon limb bone morphology Notharctus most likely was an arboreal quadruped. The robust limbs of Notharctus suggest it moved by leaping and may have been capable of vertical clinging and leaping, similar to modern day sportive lemurs and indri.

=== Paleoenvironment ===
Notharctus is known from many middle Eocene North American localities. The paleoenvironment of the Bridger formation which Notharctus inhabited was subtropical, with varying rainfall levels depending on the season. The winters were likely cool and moist, with the mean annual temperature being 65 °F (18 °C). Palms, poplars, legumes, witch-hazels, and proteaceans have been found in the Green River formation, which Notharctus is known from. Insects are also plentiful, with leafhoppers, elaters, scarabs and cixiid planthoppers all being found in Green River. Notharctus is known from the Church Butte locality, which preserves a stream-side environment which flooded annually.

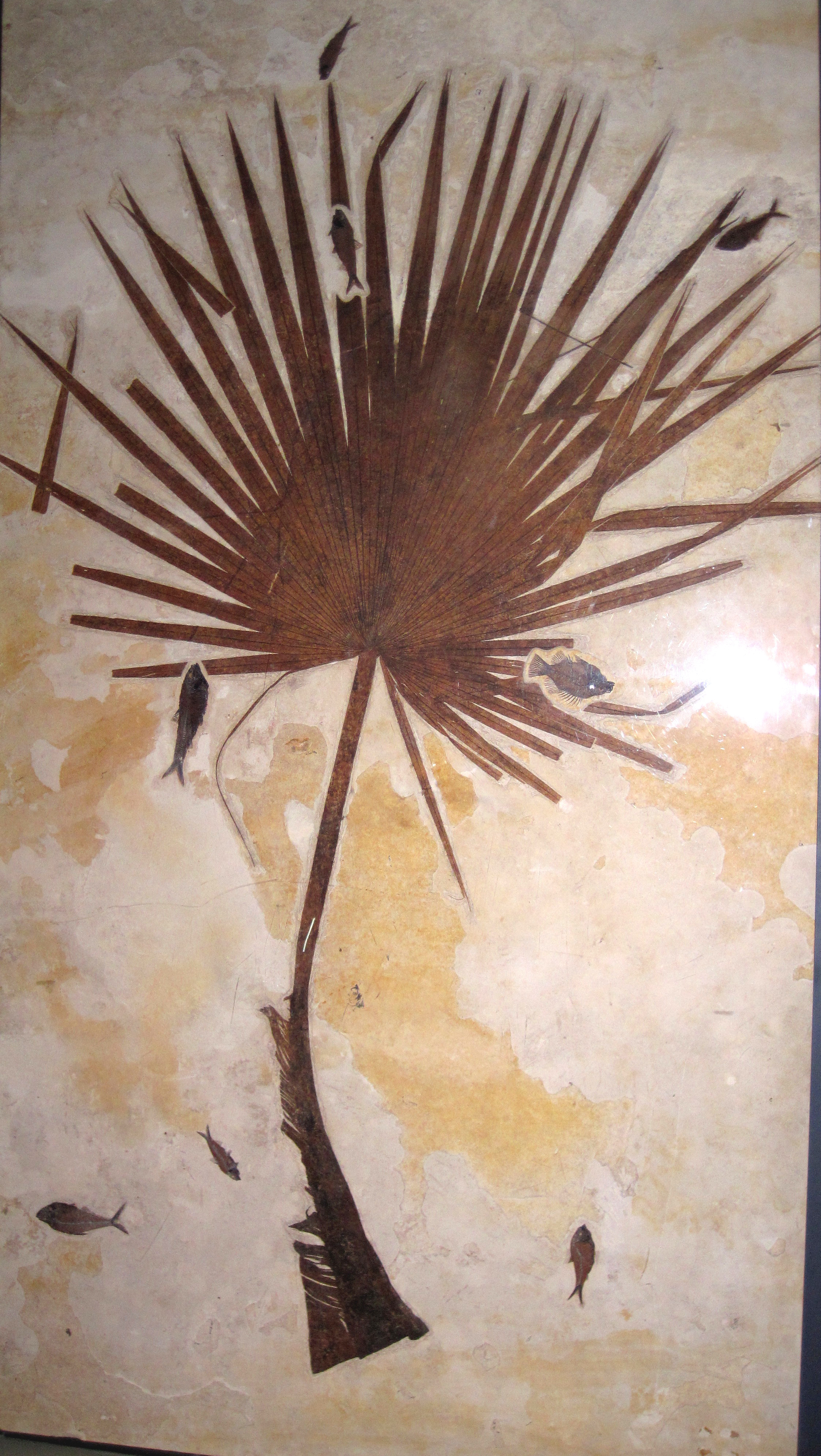
Sabalites palm and fossil fish preserved in marlstone from the Green River Formation

Notharctus was contemporary with an array of other mammalian fauna, including oxyaenids, omomyid primates, hyaenodonts, mesonychids and rhinocerotoids. In Church Butte, Notharctus coexisted with fish similar to gar, as well as trionychid turtles (Aspideretes guttatus), pulmonate snails (Physa bridgerensis), and mussels (Unio leanus).

=== Extinction ===
The cooling of the climate following the EECO (Early Eocene Climatic Optimum) is hypothesized to have driven Notharctus, alongside other North American notharctines, to extinction.

=== Distribution and stratigraphy ===
Primarily known from western North America, Notharctus fossils have been found in varying stratigraphic contexts. Notharctus was discovered in the Fort Bridger Basin, and is specifically known from many units of Fort Bridger, dating from the lower Bridgerian to the upper Bridgerian. N. tenebrosus is typically found in the B unit (dating to the middle Bridgerian) N. robinsoni is known from the A unit (dating to the early Bridgerian), while N.robustior is known from the D and C units (dating to the later Bridgerian). Notharctus is also known from the upper Green River formation, as well as the Washakie and Big Horn basins. Some specimens of Notharctus have been found in early Uintan sediments, dating around 45 million years ago. Notharctus has also been found in the Devil's Graveyard Formation of the early Uintan in Texas, but the genus is absent in the late Uintan. Notharctus venticolus is the earliest known species, being from the late early Eocene. Notharctus tenebrosus is also known from a site close to the Bridger Basin, known as Church Butte, which is primarily composed of mudstones and sandstones. It has been suggested that volcanic ash from newly formed volcanic fields contributed to sediment in the lacustrine depositional environment of Green River in the middle Eocene. Green River, with the Laney Shale member in particular (which fossils of the related Smilodectes have been found in), is made of mostly mudstone, marlstone and sandstone, with the member being 20 ft (6.1 m) thick.
