= Uintan =

- 46.3 – 41.4 Ma

Chronology
← / PETM; ← / First Antarctic permanent ice-sheets; ← / K-Pg mass extinction
Subdivision of the Paleogene according to the ICS, as of 2024. Vertical axis scale: Millions of years ago
- Formerly part of: Tertiary Period/System

Etymology
- Name formality: Formal

Usage information
- Celestial body: Earth
- Regional usage: Global (ICS)
- Time scale(s) used: ICS Time Scale

Definition
- Chronological unit: Age
- Stratigraphic unit: Stage
- Time span formality: Formal
- Upper boundary definition candidates: Calcareous nannofossil near LAD of the Haptophyte Reticulofenestra reticulata
- Upper boundary GSSP candidate section(s): Contessa highway section, Gubbio, Central Apennines, Italy

The Uintan is a North American land mammal age (NALMA), typically set from 46.3 to 41.4 million years before present. It falls within the middle of the Eocene epoch, preceded by the Bridgerian and followed by the Duchesnean NALMA stages. The Uintan is contained within the Lutetian global stage of the Middle Eocene.

The Uinta Formation in the Uinta Basin was a thriving subtropical ecosystem established around 46.0 million years ago. It serves as the namesake and a key component of faunal change within the Uintan stage. Machaeroidine oxyaenids, some of the earliest mammalian saber-toothed predators, evolved and became dominant predators in the now-Western United States. These included Apataelurus, Diegoaelurus, and Machaeroides.

== Substages ==
Defining substages for the Uintan has been a difficult process, as many of the fossil sites in the Uinta Formation are isolated from each other, complicating attempts to define a clear timeline of mammal faunas. Since the first and last occurrences of particular species are unclear in the Uinta Basin, substages are defined by assemblages of many species rather than just one or two. This also means that particular fossil sites can be used as stratotypes for each substage, The Uintan contains the following three substages, from oldest to youngest:

- Uintan 1 (Ui1): Roughly equivalent to the "Uintan A" (the lowermost stratigraphic unit of the Uinta Formation). Can be split further into Ui1a and Ui1b.
  - Since Ui1 fossils are rare in Utah, the Ui1a stratotype is actually represented by the uppermost Bridger Formation (Turtle Bluff Member) of Wyoming.
  - Ui1b does not have a single stratotype, but its mammal faunas are best represented by the Washakie Formation of Wyoming and Colorado, and the Friars Formation of California.
- Uintan 2 (Ui2): Roughly equivalent to the upper part of the "Uintan B" (i.e. the Wagonhound Member of the Uinta Formation).
- Uintan 3 (Ui3): Roughly equivalent to the Uintan C portion of the Uinta Formation (i.e. the Myton Member).

== Formations ==
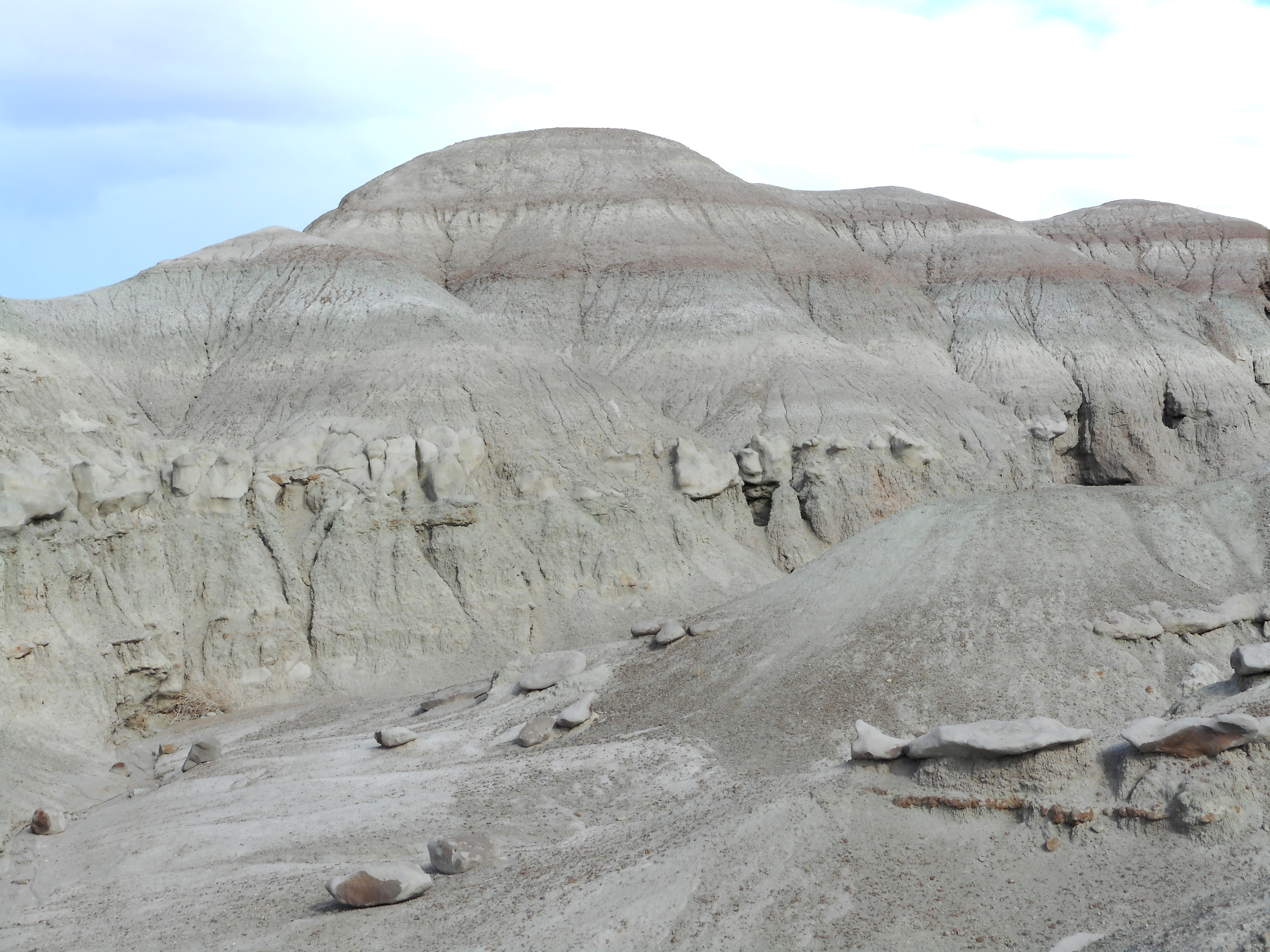
Uinta Formation, Uintah County, Utah, United States

Geological formations preserving Uintan fossils include:

- Arkansas:
  - Jackson Group
- California:
  - Friars Formation
  - Mission Valley Formation
  - Pomerado Conglomerate
  - Santiago Formation
  - Scripps Formation
  - Sespe Formation (Tapo Canyon, Brea Canyon, Strathearn local faunas)
  - Stadium Conglomerate
- Colorado:
  - Washakie Formation
- Montana:
  - "Dell Beds" (Dell Member of the Renova Formation)
  - Black Butte Low site?
  - Rapamys site?
- New Mexico:
  - Baca Formation
- Oregon:
  - Clarno Formation (Hancock Quarry?)
- Saskatchewan:
  - Cypress Hills Formation
- Texas:
  - Canoe Formation
  - Colmena Tuff (Candelaria local fauna)
  - Devil's Graveyard Formation (Junction, Whistler Squat)
  - Laredo Formation
- Utah:
  - Duchesne River Formation ("Randlett fauna", lower Brennan Basin Member)
  - Uinta Formation
- Wyoming:
  - Bridger Formation ("Bridger E", Turtle Bluff Member)
  - Washakie Formation
  - Wagon Bed Formation
  - Wiggins Formation
  - Tepee Trail Formation
