= Mescalerolemur =

Mescalerolemur Temporal range: Middle Eocene

Scientific classification
- Domain: Eukaryota
- Kingdom: Animalia
- Phylum: Chordata
- Class: Mammalia
- Order: Primates
- Suborder: Strepsirrhini
- Family: †Adapidae
- Genus: †Mescalerolemur; Kirk & Williams, 2011
- Species: †M. horneri

Binomial name
- †Mescalerolemur horneri Kirk & Williams, 2011

Extinct genus of primates

Mescalerolemur (meaning "Mescalero Apache's lemur") is an extinct genus of adapiform strepsirrhine from late Middle Eocene (Uintan age) deposits of Brewster County, Texas. It is known from the holotype TMM 41672-232, associated left and right maxillae with partial and complete teeth and from the referred specimens TMM 41672-230, TMM 41672-233 and TMM 41672-236. It was found from the Purple Bench locality of the Devil's Graveyard Formation, Big Bend region. It was first named by E. Christopher Kirk and Blythe A. Williams in 2011 and the type species is Mescalerolemur horneri. Its closest relative is Mahgarita from the same formation but slightly younger in age.
