= Poway Group =

Geological formation

- Stratigraphic range: Paleogene
- Type: Group
- Sub-units: Stadium Conglomerate, Mission Valley Formation, Pomerado Conglomerate

Location
- Region: San Diego County, California
- Country: United States

The Poway Group is a geologic group in San Diego County, Southern California. It preserves fossils dating back to the Paleogene period.

== Poway clasts ==
Volcanic clastic rock cobbles of rhyolite, in a sandstone matrix in this area are named Poway clasts.

The ancient Ballena River brought rhyolite-gravel, or "Poway" clasts, from a region in present-day Sonora, Mexico to the Pacific Ocean. Its sediments deposited into an alluvial fan–submarine canyon–submarine fan complex extending for miles offshore. Remnants of submarine fan facies outcrops are found as far west as the northern Channel Islands. Inland Ballena River deposits outcrop discontinuously over 16 miles (26 km) in a west-southwest trend from Whale Mountain to San Vicente Reservoir; here, the river was up to 2 miles (3.2 km) in width through the Peninsular Ranges.

== Stratigraphy ==
Kennedy and Moore (1971) describe a stratigraphy of up to three geologic formations: Stadium Conglomerate, Mission Valley Formation, and the later-named Pomerado Conglomerate. The basal unit is the Stadium Conglomerate. The Stadium Conglomerate is overlain by the Mission Valley Formation. The Mission Valley Formation is overlain by the Pomerado Conglomerate.

== See also ==
- List of fossiliferous stratigraphic units in California
- Paleogene Period in California
- Paleontology in California
