= La Jolla Group =

- Sub-units: Mount Soledad Formation, Ardath Shale, Scripps Sandstone, Friars Formation, Delmar Formation, Torrey Sandstone
- Underlies: Poway Group

Location
- Region: San Diego County, California
- Country: United States

The La Jolla Group is a group of geologic formations in coastal southwestern San Diego County, California.

The group preserves fossils dating back to the Cretaceous period.

Most of the La Jolla Group stratigraphy was deposited during the Eocene when sea level was higher than its present-day elevation. Eocene aged formations of the La Jolla Group include the Ardath Shale, Delmar Formation or Delmar Sand, Friars Formation, Mount Soledad Formation, Scripps Formation, and Torrey Sandstone (alphabetical order). There are only abundant fossils found in some sections of the Del Mar Formation, mostly bivalve shells.

It underlies the Stadium Conglomerate of the Poway Group.

== See also ==
- Paleogene Period in California
- List of fossiliferous stratigraphic units in California
- Paleontology in California
