= Santiago Formation, California =

Geologic formation in Orange and northwestern San Diego County, California

Santiago Formation
- Stratigraphic range: Late Eocene-Late Oligocene (Uintan-Duchesnean)
- Type: Geological formation

Lithology
- Primary: Siltstone, mudstone
- Other: Sandstone

Location
- Coordinates: 33.1°N 117.3°W
- Approximate paleocoordinates: 33.3°N 104.1°W
- Region: Orange & NW San Diego County, California
- Country: United States
- Santiago Formation, California (the United States) Santiago Formation, California (California)

The Santiago Formation is a geologic formation in Orange and northwestern San Diego County, California. The siltstones, mudstones and sandstones of the formation preserve fossils of Walshina esmaraldensis and Diegoaelurus vanvalkenburghae, dating back to the Late Eocene to Late Oligocene periods (Uintan to Duchesnean in the NALMA classification).

== Depositional environment ==
The only paleoenvironmental interpretation based exclusively on specimens from the Santiago Formation is a study of land snails from SDSNH locality 3276 (Member C, Oceanside, San Diego County), which found the distribution of shell sizes and shapes to be consistent with interpretations of subtropical to tropical conditions and paleotemperatures in excess of 25 °C (77 °F).

== Fossil content ==
=== Mammals ===
==== Ferae ====
Ferae reported from the Santiago Formation
| Genus | Species | Presence | Material | Notes | Images |
|---|---|---|---|---|---|
| Ceruttia | C. sandiegoensis | Member C. | Jaw elements & teeth. | A carnivoraform also found in the Mission Valley Formation. | |
| Diegoaelurus | D. vanvalkenburghae | "Member C". | A nearly complete dentary. | An oxyaenid. | |
| Lycophocyon | L. hutchisoni | Upper portions of "member C". | Multiple specimens. | A basal caniform. | |
| Procynodictis | P. progressus | Member C. | Jaw elements & teeth. | A miacid also known from the Sespe & Mission Valley formations. | |

==== Primatomorphs ====
Primatomorphs reported from the Santiago Formation
| Genus | Species | Presence | Material | Notes | Images |
|---|---|---|---|---|---|
| Chumashius | C. balchi | V-72088. | Isolated teeth. | An omomyid also known from the Sespe Formation. | |
| Dyseolemur | D. pacificus | V-72088. | Isolated molars. | An omomyid also known from the Sespe Formation. | |
| Walshina | W. esmaraldensis | Member C. | Teeth. | An omomyid also known from the Mission Valley & Sespe formations. | |

==== Ungulates ====
Ungulates reported from the Santiago Formation
| Genus | Species | Presence | Material | Notes | Images |
|---|---|---|---|---|---|
| Hesperaletes | H. borineyi | Member C. | Numerous specimens. | A tapiroid. | |
| Parvicornus | P. occidentalis | Member C. | Numerous specimens. | A brontothere. | |
| Protoreodon | P. walshi | Member C. | Numerous specimens. | An oreodont. | |
| Protoreodon | P. cf. walshi | Member C. | Jaw elements. | An oreodont. | |

=== Invertebrates ===
Invertebrates reported from the Santiago Formation
| Genus | Species | Presence | Material | Notes | Images |
|---|---|---|---|---|---|
| Upogebia | U. aronae | Member B. | Numerous specimens. | A mud shrimp. | |

== See also ==
- List of fossiliferous stratigraphic units in California
- Paleontology in California
