= Hesperolemur =

Hesperolemur Temporal range: 49–37 Ma Ypresian - Priabonian

Scientific classification
- Domain: Eukaryota
- Kingdom: Animalia
- Phylum: Chordata
- Class: Mammalia
- Order: Primates
- Suborder: Strepsirrhini
- Family: †Notharctidae
- Genus: †Hesperolemur; Gunnell, 1995
- Species: †H. actius

Binomial name
- †Hesperolemur actius Gunnell, 1995

Extinct genus of primates

Hesperolemur is a genus of adapiform primate that lived in the middle Eocene (49-37 million years ago) of southern California. It is an immigrant taxa which appears to be most closely related to the earlier European forms of Cantius. It was approximately 4.5 kilograms (9.9 lb) in weight and was the last surviving notharctine species, probably because of its position in the refugia that existed in southern California during the climate deterioration at the end of the middle Eocene. There are no later taxa that appear to have derived from Hesperolemur.

The weak but present development of mesostyles and pseudohypocone link Hesperolemur to Cantius. Morphologically, Hesperolemur is distinct from other notharctine taxa in having a partially fused ectotympanic anulus in the auditory bulla, no stapedial artery, and no lower molar paraconids. As the specimen used to make these analyses was badly damaged, others have argued against the existence of such differences and move Hesperolemur to a species of Cantius, Cantius actius.
