= Asiadapis =

Asiadapis Temporal range: Ypresian, 56–47.8 Ma

Scientific classification
- Domain: Eukaryota
- Kingdom: Animalia
- Phylum: Chordata
- Class: Mammalia
- Order: Primates
- Suborder: Strepsirrhini
- Family: †Notharctidae
- Subfamily: †Asiadapinae
- Genus: †Asiadapis; Rose et al., 2007

Type species
- †Asiadapis cambayensis Rose et al., 2007

Species
- †Asiadapis cambayensis Rose et al., 2007; †Asiadapis tapiensis Rose et al., 2018

Extinct genus of primates

Asiadapis is a genus of adapiform primate that lived in India's Cambay Shale Formation during the early Eocene (Ypresian). It has two known species, Asiadapis cambayensis and Asiadapis tapiensis.
