= Asiadapinae =

Asiadapinae Temporal range: Early Eocene

Scientific classification
- Kingdom: Animalia
- Phylum: Chordata
- Class: Mammalia
- Order: Primates
- Suborder: Strepsirrhini
- Family: †Notharctidae
- Subfamily: †Asiadapinae; Rose et al., 2009

Genera
- †Asiadapis; †Marcgodinotius

Extinct subfamily of mammals

Asiadapinae is a subfamily within the extinct primate family Notharctidae found in Asia during the early Eocene. They were very small and were some of the earliest adapiforms, similar to cercamoniines but also sharing features with sivaladapids.
