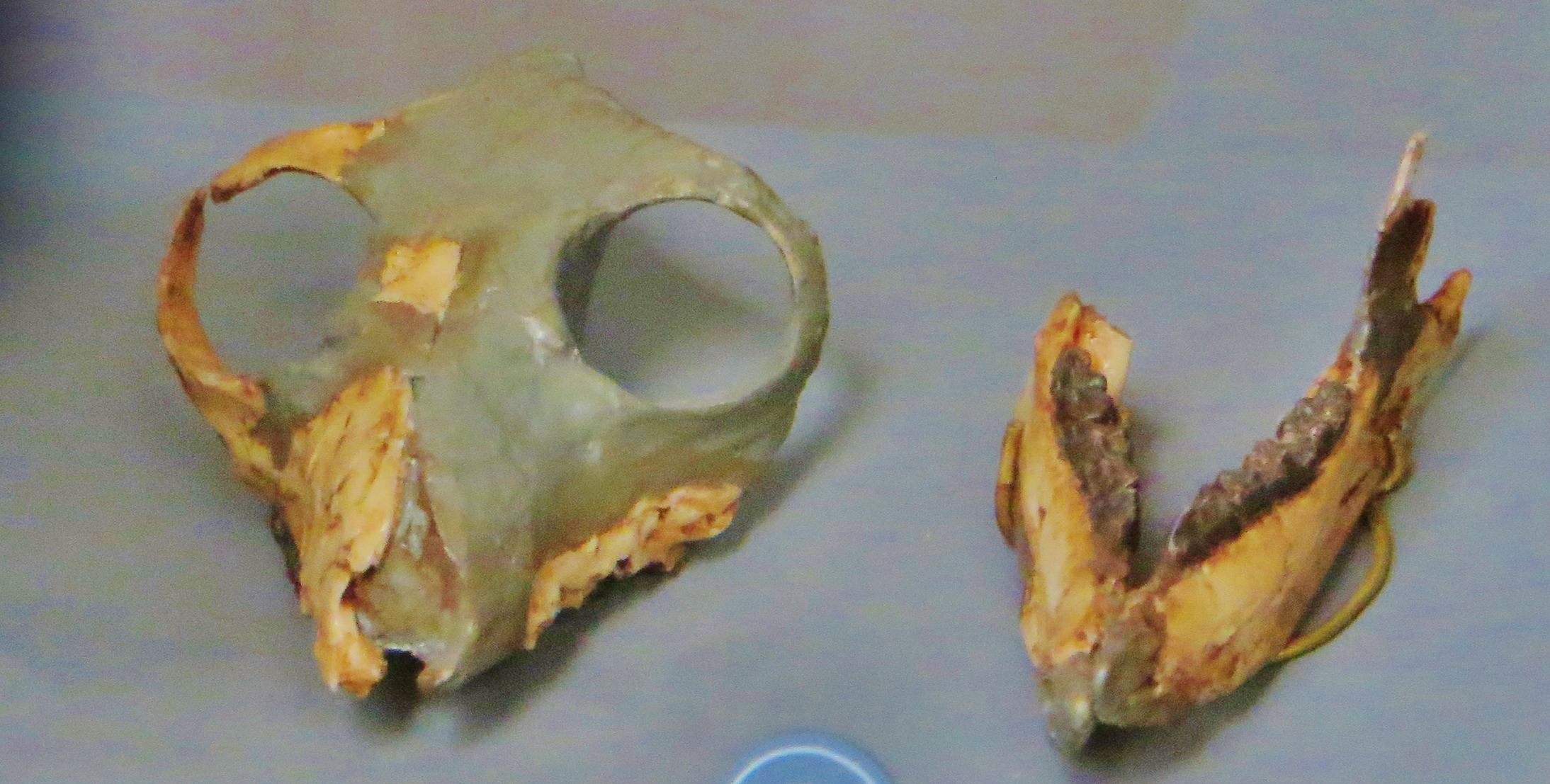

Scientific classification
- Kingdom: Animalia
- Phylum: Chordata
- Class: Mammalia
- Order: Primates
- Suborder: Strepsirrhini
- Family: †Notharctidae
- Subfamily: †Notharctinae
- Genus: †Cantius; Simons, 1962

Species
- C. abditus Gingerich & Simons, 1977; C. angulatus Cope, 1875; C. antediluvius Kihm, 1992; C. eppsi Cooper, 1932; C. frugivorus Cope, 1875; C. lohseorum Robinson, 2016; C. mckennai Gingerich & Simons 1977; C. nunienus Cope, 1881; C. ralstoni Matthew, 1915; C. savagei Gingerich, 1977; C. simonsi Gunnell, 2002; C. torresi Gingerich, 1986

= Cantius =

Cantius Temporal range: 56.0–47.8 Ma Early Eocene

Extinct genus of primates

Cantius is a genus of adapiform primates from the early Eocene of North America and Europe. It is extremely well represented in the fossil record in North America and has been hypothesized to be the direct ancestor of Notharctus in North America. The evolution of Cantius is characterized by a significant increase in body mass that nearly tripled in size. The earliest species were considered small-sized and weighed in around 1 kg (2.2 lb), while the later occurring species were considered medium-sized and likely weighed in around 3 kg (6.6 lb). Though significantly smaller, the fossil remains discovered of the various species of Cantius have striking similarities to that of Notharctus and Smilodectes. It is likely Cantius relied on arboreal quadrupedal locomotion, primarily running and leaping. This locomotor pattern comparable to that of extant lemurs, which has fostered the hypothesis that Cantius and other strepsirrhine adapiforms may have a close phylogenetic affinity to living lemurs.

== Description ==
The upper and lower dental formula of Cantius consisted of two incisors, one canine, four premolars, and three molars. In the lower molars, it is common to see a trigonid consisting of three cusps as well as a broad-basined talonid. The upper molars are interesting for North American species of Cantius, as earlier species had simple tritubercular teeth while the later species develop a pseudohypocone from the postprotocingulum (also known as the nannopithex fold). Given its unfused mandibular symphysis and molar cusp morphology, it has been inferred that Cantius was likely a frugivore that consumed fruit (as opposed to a folivorous diet of leaves and other plant material). Cantius also exhibits canine dimorphism, with males possessing relatively larger canine teeth than females. Thus Cantius can be considered a sexually dimorphic species. Specifically, C. torresi lower canines clearly demonstrate sexual dimorphism in having a male/female [canine] length ratio that falls within the range of an expected dimorphic primate.

The postcranial skeletal anatomy of Cantius suggests it was arboreal quadruped capable of running and leaping. This locomotor behavior of Cantius has been interpreted from its relatively long ischium and much more distal inferior tibial tuberosity. These features indicate that Cantius was capable of powerful extension of the thigh and flexion at the knee. These actions were crucial for the locomotor and postural behavior of Cantius. The orbits of Cantius have fueled a long-standing debate regarding the activity pattern of the extinct adapiform. After examination of orbital shape and depth, researchers interpreted Cantius as nocturnal, as its orbital dimensions fall well-above the distribution of extant nocturnal primates.

== Taxonomy ==
There are currently 11 recognized species of Cantius: C. abditus, C. angulatus, C. eppsi, C. frugivorous, C. mckennai, C. nunienus, C. ralstoni, C. savagei, C. simonsi, C. torresi, C. trigonodus. The earliest of these species (for North American Cantius) is believed to be C. torresi, which has laso been reconstructed as the smallest species within the genus (with C. eppsi being closest in size). Thus, considering the gradual pattern of body size increase documented in the Cantius lineage, C. torresi is likely to be considerably older than the later species, if not the oldest species. Along with the size comparison, C. torresi remains were identified within the Big Red Sequence within the Bighorn Basin PETM chart, thus restricting it to a geologic age older than later Cantius species.

== Morphological change and key taxa ==
The established age and antiquity of the Cantius lineage reveals an interesting and well-resolved timeline of adaptation and evolutionary change within Notharctidae. Noteworthy and well-studied species of Cantius include C. torresi and C. abditus. C. torresi, the oldest confirmed species of Cantius, exhibits sexual dimorphism in the canines body size. Thus, it can be inferred that Cantius (and its descendants) were polygynous.

After a nearly complete C. abditus skull was discovered in the Early Eocene Willwood Formation of the Bighorn Basin, where many fossils of several species of Cantius have been found, the geologic age of the fossil was ascertained and a comparative study was conducted. The study revealed that C. abditus was roughly 2 million years younger than the older species of Cantius to which it was compared. Moreover, the reconstructed body mass of C. abditus was estimated to be ~3000 grams, which is larger than earlier Cantius species, and thus conforming to the well-documented pattern of gradual body size increase within the lineage.

Through comparison of C. abditus, various other species of Cantius, Notharctus, and Smilodectes, researchers were able to identify near identical features in the auditory regions of these species, as well as that of extant lemurs.
