= Scripps Formation =

Geologic formation in coastal San Diego County

- Stratigraphic range: Eocene
- Type: geologic formation
- Underlies: Friars Formation
- Overlies: Ardath Shale
- Thickness: 0–56 m (0–184 ft)

Location
- Region: San Diego County, California
- Country: United States

Type section
- Named for: Scripps Pier

The Scripps Formation is a geologic formation in coastal San Diego County, California. It is named for its type section north of Scripps Pier, on the north side of the Blacks Canyon mouth.

== Geography ==
It underlies much of the area from east of Del Mar on the north to the mouth of Mission Valley on the south, and extends north to the Encinitas area. Along the coast, it can be seen from central Torrey Pines State Natural Reserve to Scripps Institution of Oceanography, in La Jolla.

In the north near Encinitas, it correlates with the upper Torrey Sandstone.

== Geology ==
It overlies the Ardath Shale, and underlies the Friars Formation.

Sea level rose and fell often during this period of the Eocene Epoch in geologic history. About 42 million years ago, sea level rose again and more sand was deposited. Compressed and cemented, it makes the rock known as the Scripps Formation. This rock holds up the sea bluffs north of Moonlight Beach. Because the mudstone and siltstone of the Ardath Formation are softer and weaker layers, waves erode it and undermine the stronger Scripps Formation sandstone above it, as happens with the Del Mar Formations below Torrey Formations.

=== Fossil content ===
Fossils are present but are less common in the Scripps Formation than in the underlying Ardath Shale. Those it preserves date back to the Eocene Epoch of the Paleogene period, during the Cenozoic Era.

== See also ==
- Geology of San Diego County, California
- Paleogene Period in California
- List of fossiliferous stratigraphic units in California
- Paleontology in California
