= Laredo Formation =

Geologic formation in Mexico and the United States

- Stratigraphic range: Lutetian (Uintan); ~48–42 Ma
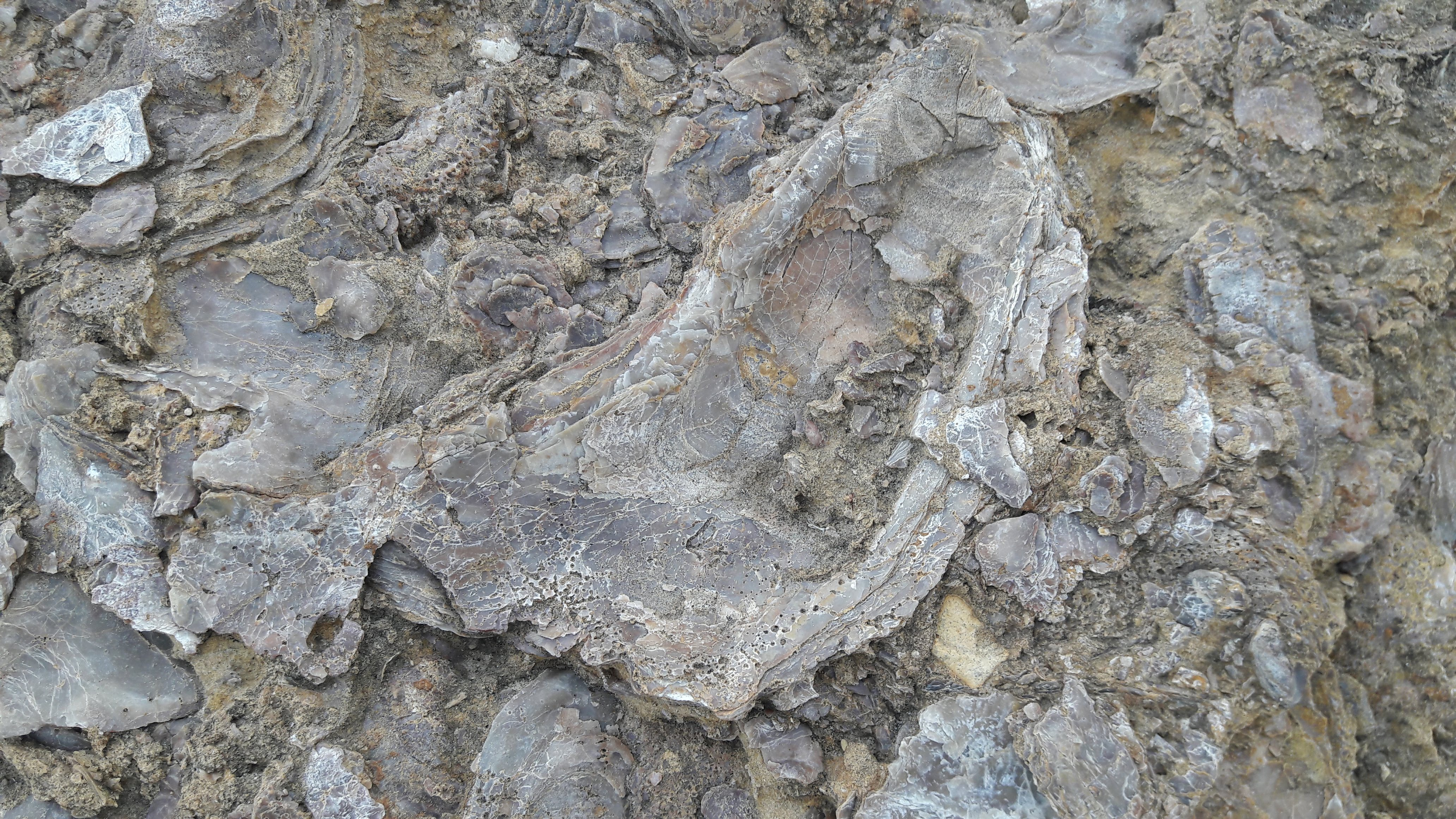
- Type: Formation
- Unit of: Claiborne Group

Lithology
- Primary: Sandstone
- Other: Shale, limestone

Location
- Coordinates: 26.4°N 99.2°W
- Approximate paleocoordinates: 28.4°N 89.6°W
- Region: Texas; Nuevo León, Tamaulipas
- Country: United States, Mexico
- Laredo Formation (Mexico)

The Laredo Formation is a geologic formation and Lagerstätte in Texas, United States, and Nuevo León and Tamaulipas, Mexico. It preserves fossils dating back to the Lutetian stage of the Eocene period. Among many other fossils, the formation has provided invertebrates, vertebrates, leaves, pollen and spores and fossil wood of the brackish water palm Nypa sp.

== See also ==
- List of fossiliferous stratigraphic units in Mexico
- List of fossiliferous stratigraphic units in Texas
- Paleontology in Texas
