= Pomerado Conglomerate =

Geologic formation

Pomerado Conglomerate Formation
- Stratigraphic range: Late Eocene
- Type: Geologic formation
- Overlies: Mission Valley Formation
- Thickness: 0–55 metres (0–180 ft)

Lithology
- Primary: conglomerate

Location
- Region: San Diego County, California
- Country: United States

Type section
- Named for: Pomerado Road

The Pomerado Conglomerate Formation is a geologic formation in southwestern San Diego County, California.

It was named for exposures located along Pomerado Road, at the divide between Carroll Canyon and Poway Valley.

== Geology ==
The Pomerado Conglomerate is of the Late Eocene Epoch, and is a massive cobble conglomerate. It is lithologically identical to the local Stadium Conglomerate.

It overlies the sandstone Mission Valley Formation. It is the uppermost formation of the Poway Group, and has a maximum thickness of 55 metres (180 ft).

== Fossil content ==
Color key: Taxon / Reclassified taxon / Taxon falsely reported as present / Dubious taxon or junior synonym / Ichnotaxon / Ootaxon / Morphotaxon	Notes; Uncertain or tentative taxa are in small text; ~~crossed out~~ taxa are discredited.

The Pomerado Conglomerate preserves fossils dating back to the Late Eocene Epoch of the Paleogene period, during the Cenozoic Era.

=== Mammals ===
==== Ferae ====
Ferae reported from the Pomerado Conglomerate
Genus	Species	Presence	Material	Notes	Images
Carnivoraformes undet. Genus B		SDSNH locality 3757, Scripps Ranch North Site 57, Miramar Sandstone Member.	SDSNH 56335, cranium with right and left P4-M2.		
Hyaenodon	cf. H. sp.	Upper Member.	"SDSNH 60554, right maxillary fragment with P3–P4".	Specimen reidentified as the nimravid Pangurban.	
Pangurban	P. egiae	Upper Member.	"SDSNH 60554, right maxillary fragment with P3–P4".	A nimravid, originally reported as cf. Hyaenodon sp.	

==== Rodents ====
Rodents reported from the Pomerado Conglomerate
Genus	Species	Presence	Material	Notes	Images
Nonomyinae	Indeterminate		Isolated m1 (SDSNH 72232).	"An unnamed new taxon of nonomyine morphologically intermediate between Nonomys and Diplolophus."	
Nonomys	N. gutzleri		Isolated teeth.	A myomorph.	

== See also ==
- Geology of San Diego County, California
- Paleogene Period in California
- List of fossiliferous stratigraphic units in California
- Paleontology in California
