= Friars Formation =

Geologic formation in San Diego County

- Stratigraphic range: Eocene
- Type: Geologic formation
- Unit of: La Jolla Group
- Underlies: Stadium Conglomerate
- Overlies: Scripps Formation
- Thickness: 0–50 metres (0–164 ft)

Location
- Region: San Diego County, California
- Country: United States

Type section
- Named for: Friars Road

The Friars Formation is a geologic formation in San Diego County, California.

== Geology ==
It is the uppermost unit of the La Jolla Group. The rocks are nonmarine and lagoonal sandstone and claystone, named for exposures along the north side of Mission Valley near Friars Road.

It reaches a maximum thickness of 50 metres (160 ft) between Mission Valley and Carmel Valley.

=== Fossils ===
It preserves fossils dating back to the middle and late Eocene epoch of the Paleogene period, during the Cenozoic Era.

== See also ==
- Geology of San Diego County, California
- Paleogene Period in California
- List of fossiliferous stratigraphic units in California
- Paleontology in California
