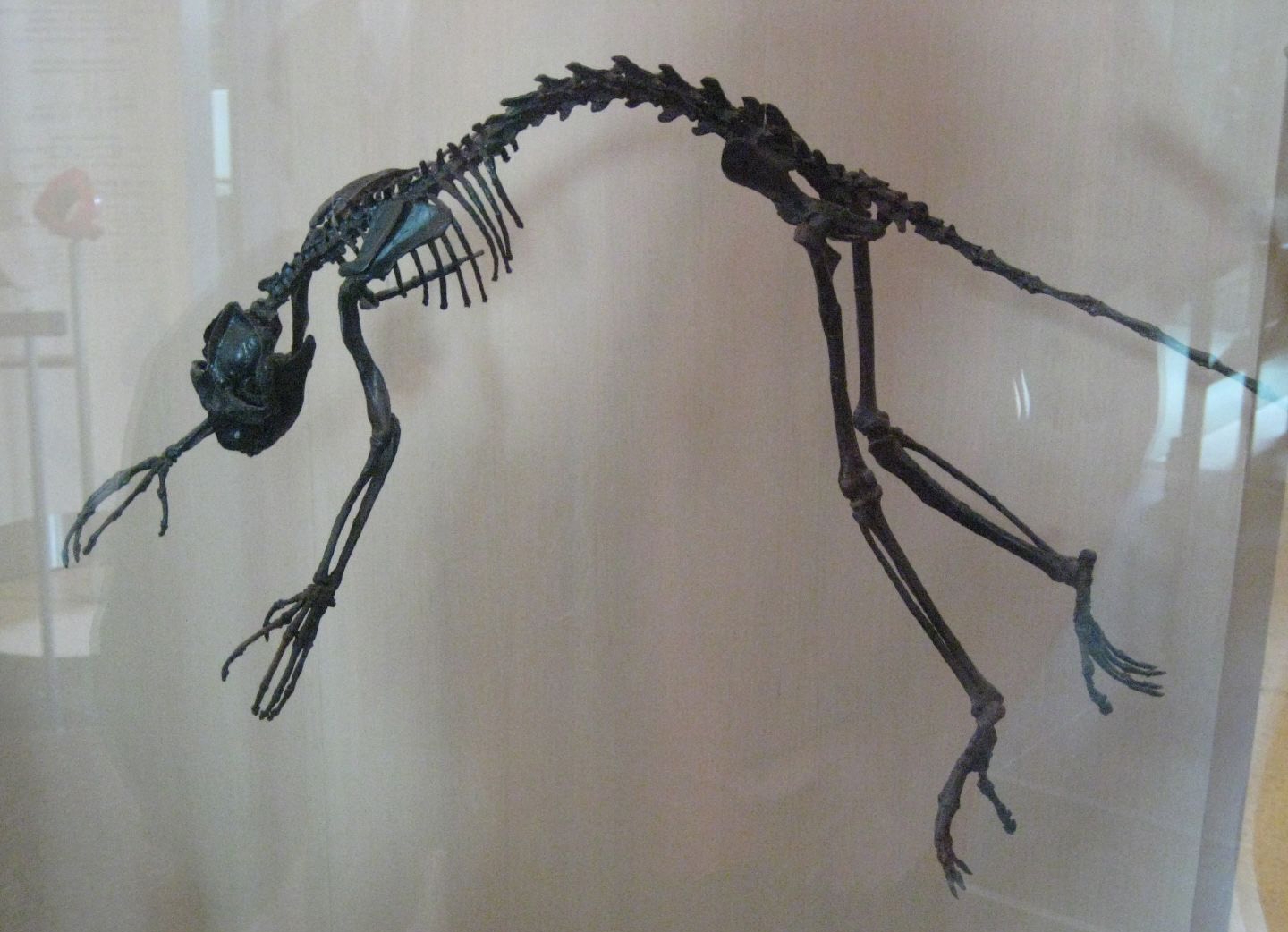
- Notharctus tenebrosus

Scientific classification
- Domain: Eukaryota
- Kingdom: Animalia
- Phylum: Chordata
- Class: Mammalia
- Order: Primates
- Suborder: Strepsirrhini
- Family: †Notharctidae
- Subfamily: †Notharctinae; Trouessart, 1879

Genera
- †Cantius; †Copelemur; †Hesperolemur; †Notharctus; †Pelycodus; †Smilodectes

= Notharctinae =

Notharctinae Temporal range: Early-Middle Eocene

Extinct subfamily of mammals

Notharctinae is an extinct subfamily of primates that were common in North America during the early and middle Eocene (55-34 million years ago). The six genera that make up the group (Cantius, Pelycodus, Copelemur, Hesperolemur, Notharctus, and Smilodectes) contain species that are among the most primitive of the adapiform group, which is one of the most primitive groups of primates. The evolutionary history of this subfamily has been comparatively well documented and has been used to argue for evolutionary gradualism. Though it is generally accepted that adapiforms gave rise to modern day lemurs and lorises, it is not currently known which branch of Adapiformes these living species are most closely related to. Notharctines became extinct in the middle Eocene, most likely because of a combination of factors including climatic change and competition with other North American primates.

== Taxonomic diversity ==
Notharctinae is one of the two subfamilies, along with Cercamoniinae, of the Notharctidae family, which is a member of the infraorder Adapiformes along with Adapidae and Sivaladapidae. Compared to other subfamilies, the notharctines were not terribly diverse with only two or three species occurring synchronously. However, notharctines are some of the most common species found in early and middle Eocene deposits. Each genus has between 1 (Hesperolemur) and 11 (Cantius) species for a total of 25 species making up the subfamily. Body size ranges from 1100 grams in early species of Cantius to 6900 grams in late occurring Notharctus with an overall trend of increasing body size.

Overall, each genus was restricted to a small geographic region. Cantius was a northern (Wyoming) early Eocene genus, while the other two early Eocene genera, Pelycodus and Copelemur, occupied more southern habitats (New Mexico). Middle Eocene taxa, Notharctus and Smilodectes. were again found in Wyoming, while Hesperolemur is known only from southern California. This move to the north may be associated with climatic warming between the early and the middle Eocene.

== Morphology ==
Overall, the notharctines retain a very primitive primate morphology. They have long broad snouts, a dental formula of 2.1.4.3, a lacrimal bone within the orbit, and, except for Notharctus, an unfused mandible. All have small orbits which indicate a diurnal lifestyle and there is some evidence of the reduction of the sense of smell in favor of the sense of sight. One of the diagnostic features of this subfamily is that later species acquired a hypocone, or an extra cusp on the upper molars, from the postprotocingulum, instead of the lingual cingulum (a shelf on the margin of the tooth at the side of the tongue) as in cercamoniines. Many later species show increasing adaptation for folivory including increased body size, the loss of the paraconids, and the fusion of the mandible. Hesperolemur is unique among notharctines in having the tympanic ring partially fused to the auditory bulla.

Postcranial remains of Notharctus have linked notharctine locomotion with that of living lemurs. There is also evidence of canine sexual dimorphism in Notharctus which may indicate the presence of social groups.

== Evolutionary history ==
The earliest widely accepted adapiform was the European cercamoniine Donrussellia, though recent finds of additional species may soon show otherwise. Donrussellia is closely related to the earlier and more primitive European notharctine species of Cantius. After surviving the Atlantic crossing, more advanced species of Cantius gradually got bigger and developed larger mesostyles and hypocones, which go along with the switch from a primarily frugivorous diet to a folivorous one.

Some have suggested that there were two separate immigrations of Cantius, one which gave rise to the larger Pelycodus and one which gave rise to the smaller lineages of Copelemur, Smilodectes and Notharctus. Others have suggested that a single lineage of Cantius split, with one branch leading to Copelemur, one to Pelycodus, and one gradually acquiring a fused mandible, one of the few diagnostic features between Cantius and Notharctus. Smilodectes either derived from the lineage that became Notharctus or from the more southern Copelemur lineage. Hesperolemur, a middle Eocene taxa, has only recently been described and is currently thought to be an immigrant species.

Though some scientists believe that members of the adapiform radiation gave rise to simians because of the long list of dental and cranial similarities including a fused mandible, loss of paraconids, and large, sexually dimorphic canines, normally the European cercamoniines are the specific subfamily cited. It is more widely agreed upon that adapiforms are closely related to modern lemurs and lorises, although there much speculation as to which taxa are more closely related.
