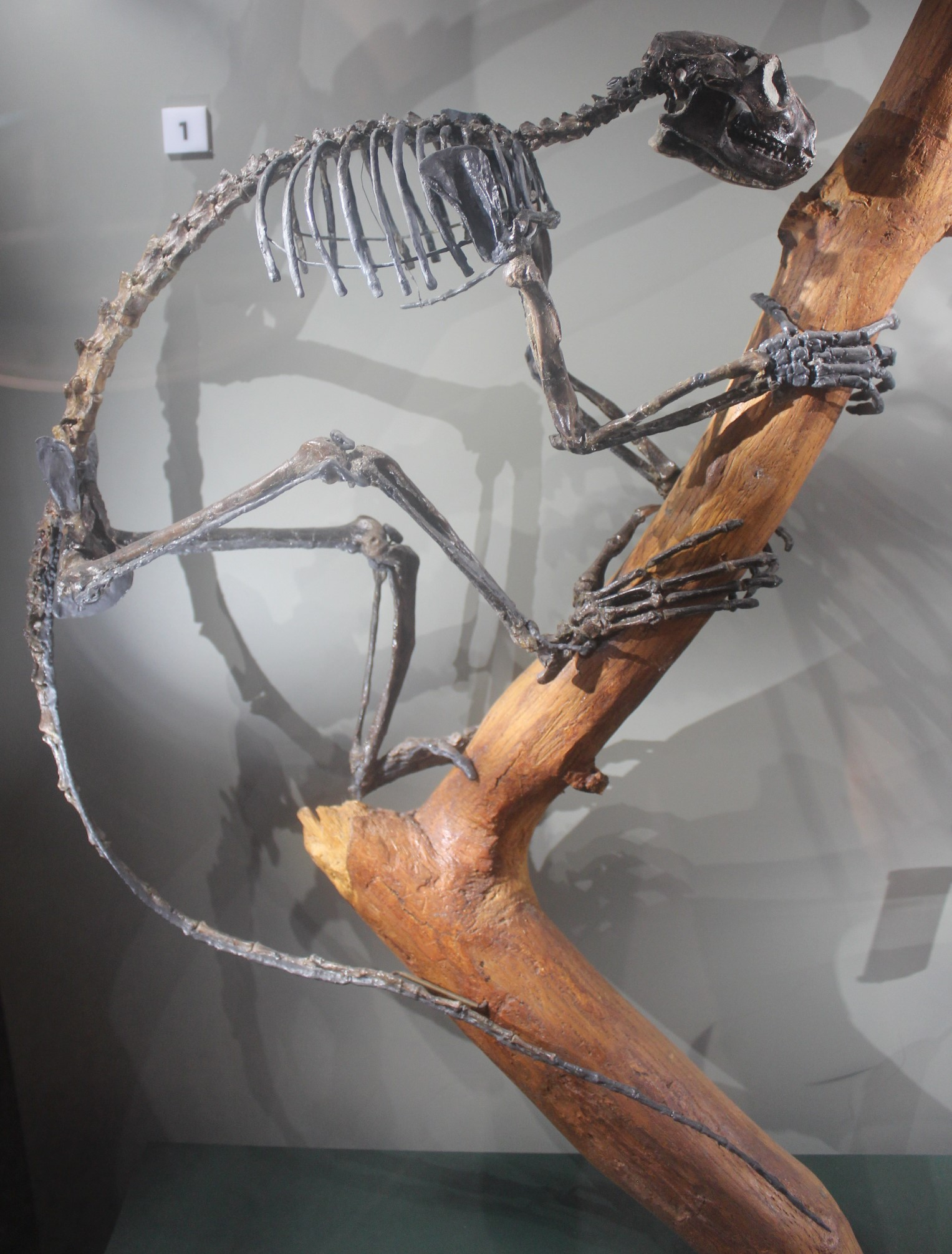
- Smilodectes skeleton at the Smithsonian National Museum of Natural History

Scientific classification
- Kingdom: Animalia
- Phylum: Chordata
- Class: Mammalia
- Order: Primates
- Suborder: Strepsirrhini
- Family: †Notharctidae
- Subfamily: †Notharctinae
- Genus: †Smilodectes; Wortman, 1903

Species
- S. gingerichi Beard, 1988; S. gracilis Marsh, 1871; S. mcgrewi Gingerich, 1979

= Smilodectes =

Smilodectes Temporal range: Early-Mid Eocene (Wasatchian-Bridgerian) ~50.3–46.2 Ma

Extinct genus of primates

Smilodectes is a genus of adapiform primate that lived in North America during the middle Eocene. It possesses a post-orbital bar and grasping thumbs and toes. Smilodectes has a small cranium size and the foramen magnum was located at the back of the skull, on the occipital bone.

== Named species ==
There are three named species: Smilodectes gracilis, Smilodectes gingerichi and Smilodectes mcgrewi.

=== Smilodectes gracilis ===
Smilodectes gracilis was an adapiformes primate from the early Eocene, some 55 million years ago. S. gracilis was found on the land mass of North America and based on its dental morphology, S. gracilis was a folivore.

S. gracilis had a dental formula of 2.1.4.32.1.4.3 and had a relatively short snout, with rounded frontal bone as compared to other nothactines. This species lacked symphyseal fusion and this species of primate had comparatively reduced olfactory bulbs and a more expanded visual cortex. This suggests that S. gracilis was a diurnal species. S. gracilis had a cranial capacity of 9.5 cc. It is thought that S. gracilis had an average body mass of around 2.1 kilograms. Based upon its postcranial skeleton, S. gracilis was a vertical clinger and leaper.
