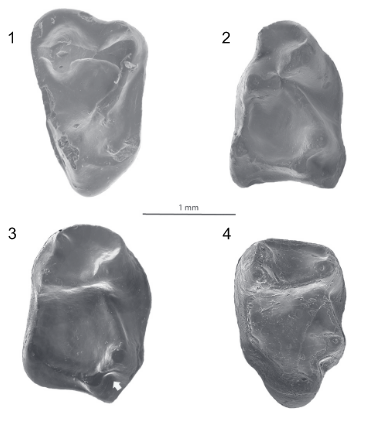
- Dentition of Walshina esmaraldensis

Scientific classification
- Kingdom: Animalia
- Phylum: Chordata
- Class: Mammalia
- Order: Primates
- Suborder: Haplorhini
- Family: †Omomyidae
- Genus: †Walshina; López-Torres et al., 2018

Species
- W. esmaraldensis (López-Torres et al., 2018); W. mcgrewi (Robinson, 1968); W. shifrae (Krishtalka, 1978)

Synonyms
- Ignacius mcgrewi; Phenacolemur shifrae

= Walshina =

Walshina Temporal range: 46.2–42.0 Ma

Extinct primate genus

Walshina is a genus of omomyid primate from Eocene North America.

== Description ==
Walshina has smooth enamel on its lower molars, similar to those of the related genus Trogolemur. In size, Walshina has among the smallest molars of all North American omomyids. This has led researchers to speculate it is among the smallest omomyids in body mass as well.

== Classification ==
Due to its fragmentary nature, the taxonomic placement of Walshina has been debated. Morphologically, the molars of Walshina resemble those of Paromomyidae, which has led to Walshina being placed inside the clade. This is refuted, however, and most modern literature returns Walshina as a true omomyid. Some species have also previously been assigned to the genus Ignacius.
