= Stadium Conglomerate =

Geologic formation in California, US

- Stratigraphic range: Eocene
- Type: Geologic formation
- Underlies: Mission Valley Formation
- Overlies: Friars Formation

Lithology
- Primary: Conglomerate

Location
- Region: San Diego County, California
- Country: United States

Type section
- Named for: San Diego Stadium

The Stadium Conglomerate is a geologic formation in San Diego County, California. It is found at the northern end of Mission Valley near Snapdragon Stadium.

== Geology ==
The formation consists of a massive cobble conglomerate with a dark yellowish-brown coarse-grained sandstone matrix. The conglomerate has dispersed lenses of fossiliferous crossbedded sandstone.

It overlies the Friars Formation, and underlies the sandstone Mission Valley Formation.

=== Fossil content ===
It preserves fossils dating back to the Eocene epoch of the Paleogene period, during the Cenozoic Era. The fossils include calcareous nanoplankton.

== See also ==
- Geology of San Diego County, California
- Paleogene Period in California
- List of fossiliferous stratigraphic units in California
- Paleontology in California
