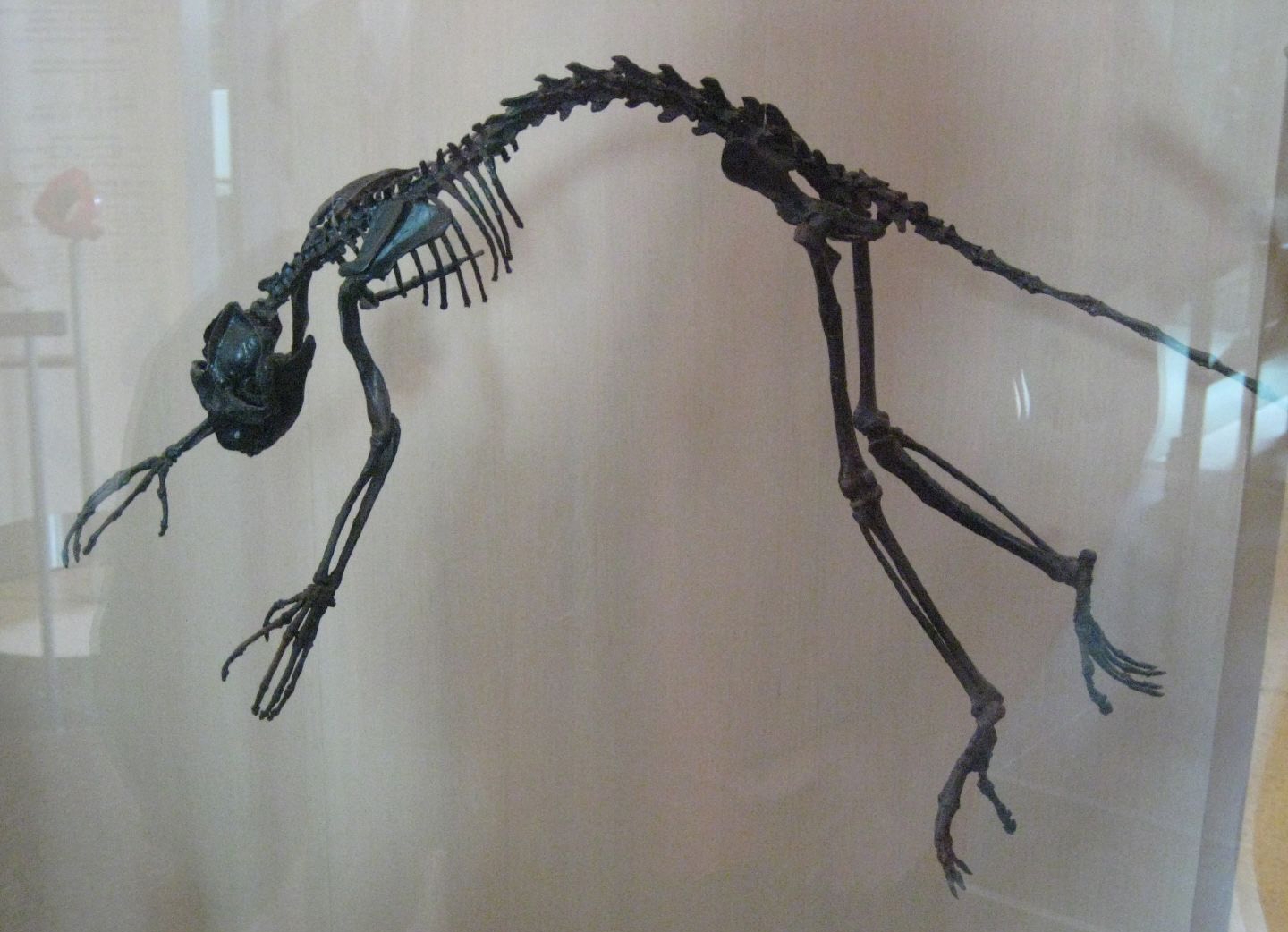
- Notharctus tenebrosus

Scientific classification
- Kingdom: Animalia
- Phylum: Chordata
- Class: Mammalia
- Order: Primates
- Suborder: Strepsirrhini
- Superfamily: †Adapoidea
- Family: †Notharctidae; Trouessart, 1879

Subfamilies
- †Asiadapinae; †Cercamoniinae; †Notharctinae

= Notharctidae =

Notharctidae Temporal range: 56.0–33.9 Ma Eocene

Extinct family of mammals

Notharctidae is an extinct family of adapiform primates found primarily in North America and Europe.

== Classification ==
- Family Notharctidae
  - Subfamily Asiadapinae
  - Subfamily Cercamoniinae
  - Subfamily Notharctinae
