= Hoanghoniinae =

Hoanghoniinae Temporal range: Middle Eocene–Late Eocene

Scientific classification
- Kingdom: Animalia
- Phylum: Chordata
- Class: Mammalia
- Order: Primates
- Suborder: Strepsirrhini
- Family: †Sivaladapidae
- Subfamily: †Hoanghoniinae; Gingerich et al., 1994

Genera
- †Hoanghonius; †Lushius; †Rencunius; †Wailekia

Extinct subfamily of mammals

Hoanghoniinae is a subfamily of adapiform primate that lived in Asia during the middle to late Eocene.
