= Magerifelis =

Magerifelis Temporal range: Middle Miocene

Scientific classification
- Kingdom: Animalia
- Phylum: Chordata
- Class: Mammalia
- Order: Carnivora
- Family: Felidae
- Subfamily: Felinae
- Genus: †Magerifelis; Salesa et al., 2024

Type species
- Magerifelis peignei Salesa et al., 2024

Extinct genus of felid

Magerifelis is an extinct genus of feline with only one species assigned to it, Magerifelis peignei. It was described in 2024 based on seven fossils from the middle Miocene of Spain and France.

== History and naming ==
The holotype fossil (05/101/2/3622) was discovered in 2007 from the Príncipe Pío-2 locality in Madrid, Spain. In 2024, it was described by a group of researchers at the Museo Nacional de Ciencias Naturales as a new genus and species, Magerifelis peignei. Six other fossils from France that had previously been assigned to Styriofelis turnauensis were reassigned to the new species.

The generic name Magerifelis is a combination of "Magerit", the original name for Madrid, and the Latin word felis meaning "cat". The specific name peignei honors the French paleontologist Stéphane Peigné, a deceased colleague and friend of the describing authors.

== Description ==
All the known fossils of Magerifelis are hemimandibles, with or without various teeth intact. The species was described as having a relatively small lower canine tooth, with an absent or severely reduced second premolar, third and fourth premolars present, and the first molar present, and second molar also present but reduced.

== Classification ==
Salesa et al. assigned Magerifelis to the subfamily Felinae in the cat family Felidae. They also recovered it in a small cladogram as outside of a clade containing several extant cat species, but more derived than some other known fossil species:

- Felidae
  - Proailurus lemanensis
  - - Leptofelis vallesiensis
    - - Styriofelis turnauensis
      - - Miopanthera lorteti
        - - Magerifelis peignei
          - - Lynx pardinus
            - - Felis margarita
              - - Caracal aurata
                - Felis silvestris
              - - Pristifelis attica
                - Felis lybica

== Palaeobiology ==
Based on its holotype, Magerifelis peignei was estimated to weigh about 7.61 kilograms (16.8 lb), though the researchers suggested that the robustness of the hemimandible indicated that the actual body weight was higher.

== Palaeoecology ==
Like similarly-sized modern cats, Magerifelis likely preyed on rodents, birds, lagomorphs, and small mustelids, all of which have been recorded from the Príncipe Pío-2 site; it may also have preyed on small ungulates such as Cainotherium, Micromeryx, Lagomeryx, and Dorcatherium. Though the researchers also stated that the robustness of the jaws indicate that M. peignei also preyed on larger animals than other similarly-sized felids would.

The Príncipe Pío-2 locality has been dated back to European land mammal age 5 (middle Aragonian) of the Middle Miocene, about 15.5 million years ago.
