= Laomaki =

Laomaki Temporal range: Early Oligocene ~33–34 Ma

Scientific classification
- Kingdom: Animalia
- Phylum: Chordata
- Class: Mammalia
- Order: Primates
- Suborder: Strepsirrhini
- Family: †Sivaladapidae
- Genus: †Laomaki; Ni et al., 2016

Type species
- †Laomaki yunnanensis Ni et al., 2016

Extinct genus of primates

Laomaki is a genus of adapiform primate that lived during the Early Oligocene in Asia, containing the species Laomaki yunnanensis. It was described from a right maxilla fragment. Its molars and premolars are somewhat similar to those of Rencunius and Anthradapis respectively. Its placement within the family Sivaladapidae is uncertain; it has not been placed in a subfamily. It has been found at sites in Jammu and Kashmir and Yunnan, having lived around the time of the Eocene–Oligocene transition.

== Discovery and naming ==
The type species of Laomaki, L. yunnanensis, was first described by Xijun Ni, Qiang Li, Lüzhou Li, and K. Christopher Beard in 2016 from a right maxilla fragment found at the Early Oligocene Lijiawa fossil site, part of the Caijiachong Formation in Yunnan Province, China. The generic name comes from the Mandarin word lao (lit. 'old') and the Malagasy word maky (lit. 'lemur'), while the specific name is in reference to the geographic location of the remains.

== Description ==
Unlike any other sivaladapid besides Rencunius, Laomaki has strongly developed conules on its upper molars. Both the upper and lower molars of Laomaki differ from those of the former taxon in their extremely crenulated enamel, pyramidal cusps, and sharper crests. The upper molars are also more transverse than those of Rencunius, with pyramidal conules as opposed to bulbous ones, and its hypocones (small cusps found on mammalian upper molars) are smaller. The P_{4} and P^{4} premolars are less molarized than those of Yunnanadapis and Miocene sivaladapids. Its premolars were also compared to those of Anthradapis in the latter's taxonomic description. It has an estimated body mass of 188 grams (6.6 oz).

== Classification ==
Laomaki belongs to the family Sivaladapidae, a group of adapoid primates whose relationship with other taxonomic groups remains uncertain; they are possibly close relatives of the European cercamoniids. The placement of Laomaki within the family is unknown, making the genus incertae sedis. A 2017 phylogenetic study found support for a clade within Sivaladapidae containing the basal genera Laomaki, Hoanghonius, Paukkaungia, and Kyitchaungia. While the original description of Laomaki found it to be intermediate between the genera Hoanghonius and Rencunius, the aforementioned 2017 study found Laomaki closer to Hoanghonius, as sister taxa.

Phylogenetic tree detail:

- - Rencunius zhoui
  - - Anthradapis vietnamensis
    - - Yunnanadapis folivorus
      - - Hoanghonius stehlini
        - - Laomaki yunnanensis
          - - Muangthanhinius siami
            - - Bugtilemur mathesoni
              - Gatanthropus micros

== Paleoecology ==
The holotype of the genus Laomaki was found in strata of Early Oligocene age in Yunnan, about 34 million years old. This coincides with the Eocene-Oligocene transition, an episode of cooler and drier climactic conditions that led to the extirpation of primates in North America and Europe. Still, several clades of primates managed to persist in Asia, Sivaladapidae among them. In China, Myanmar, and Thailand, anthropoids dominate the Late Eocene primate fossil record; by contrast, only one of six primates known from the Early Oligocene in Yunnan is a member of the group, while multiple sivaladapid genera, including Laomaki, have been discovered. Specimens have also been found in the Lower Siwalik deposits near the town of Ramnagar in Jammu and Kashmir, with a mean age estimate of c. 33 million years.

Within China, Laomaki is known solely from the Ulantatalian stage (a Chinese land mammal age for fossils of Early Oligocene age named after the Ulantatal area in Inner Mongolia). Other mammalian taxa known exclusively from this stage include the artiodactyls Eumeryx culminis and Praetragulus gobiae; the lagomorphs Desmatolagus pusillus, D. youngi, and Ordolagus teilhardi; the hyaenodont Hyaenodon neimongoliensis; the erinaceomorph Palaeoscaptor acridens; the primates Yunnanadapis folivorus, Y. imperator, Gatanthropus micros, Bahinia banyueae, and Oligotarsius rarus; and over twenty species of rodents belonging to various genera. Early Oligocene mammal taxa recovered specifically from the Lijiawa fossil site include Ptilocercus kylin (a treeshrew), Gigantamynodon giganteus, Cricetops, and Eucricetodon.

During the Eocene-Oligocene transition, the physical environment of Asia changed significantly as a result of aridification, with open grasslands replacing forests, although a 2020 study found that this change in climate may have had a less dramatic effect on fauna than previously thought. On a geographic scale, the Paratethys Sea retreated from Central Asia, the uplift of the Himalayas continued, and the South China Sea opened.
