= Indraloris =

Scientific classification
- Kingdom: Animalia
- Phylum: Chordata
- Class: Mammalia
- Order: Primates
- Suborder: Strepsirrhini
- Family: †Sivaladapidae
- Subfamily: †Sivaladapinae
- Genus: †Indraloris; Lewis, 1933

Species
- Indraloris himalayensis Pilgrim, 1932 Synonym: Indraloris lulli Lewis, 1933; Indraloris kamlialensis Flynn and Morgan, 2005

Extinct genus of primates

Indraloris is a fossil primate from the Miocene of India and Pakistan in the family Sivaladapidae. Two species are now recognized: I. himalayensis from Haritalyangar, India (about 9 million years old) and I. kamlialensis from the Pothohar Plateau, Pakistan (15.2 million years old). Other material from the Potwar Plateau (16.8 and 15.2 million years old) may represent an additional, unnamed species. Body mass estimates range from about 2 kg (4.4 lb) for the smaller I. kamlialensis to over 4 kg (8.8 lb) for the larger I. himalayensis.

Indraloris is known from isolated teeth and fragmentary lower jaws. The jaw is deep under the last premolars, but becomes shallower towards the front. The lower premolars are elongate. The lower molars are shorter and broader than those of Sivaladapis. Indraloris may have been arboreal and at least partly frugivorous. When the first Indraloris fossils were discovered in the early 1930s, one was misidentified as a carnivoran and the other as a loris. The carnivoran identification was corrected in 1968, and in 1979 Indraloris and the related Sivaladapis were identified as late survivors of Adapiformes, an archaic primate group.

== Taxonomy ==
Currently, Indraloris is considered to be a valid genus within the family Sivaladapidae, containing two named species: I. himalayensis from India and I. kamlialensis from Pakistan. A third species may be represented in the Pakistani material of Indraloris. However, Indraloris has had a complicated taxonomic history, and some of the known material was misidentified as members of other mammalian groups for decades.

In 1932, British paleontologist Guy Pilgrim described two species from the Miocene of what is now India and Pakistan, Sivanasua palaeindica from Chinji (Pakistan) and Sivanasua himalayensis from Haritalyangar (India). He attributed both to Sivanasua, a carnivoran genus otherwise known from Europe. The next year, American scientist G. Edward Lewis described the new genus and species Indraloris lulli from Haritalyangar, which he provisionally allocated to the family Lorisidae. The generic name, Indraloris, combines the name of the god Indra with the generic name Loris, and the specific name, lulli, honors Richard Swann Lull, at the time director of the Peabody Museum of Natural History. It was not until 1968 that American anthropologist Ian Tattersall noted that Pilgrim's Sivanasua species had been misidentified; he suggested that Sivanasua himalayensis was probably the same as Indraloris lulli, but left the affinities of Sivanasua palaeindica open. Tattersall, who also described additional material of Indraloris, continued to regard the animal as a lorisid.

Lewis had suggested that Indraloris might derive from the Adapidae, a primitive group of primates, and in the 1970s some authors provisionally placed Indraloris among the Adapidae. In 1979, American and Indian paleontologists Philip Gingerich and Ashok Sahni reviewed Indraloris and the Indo-Pakistani "Sivanasua" species. They recognized Sivanasua himalayensis and Indraloris lulli as representing the same species, Indraloris himalayensis, and created the new genus Sivaladapis for Sivanasua palaeindica and another species that had been named later, Sivanasua nagrii. Gingerich and Sahni considered both Indraloris and Sivaladapis to be adapids.

Several other authors suggested similar taxonomic rearrangements around the same time. In 1979, Herbert Thomas and Surinder Verma agreed that Indraloris and Sivaladapis were adapids, but placed them in a subfamily of their own, Sivaladapinae. Also in 1979, Frederick Szalay and Eric Delson placed Indraloris in its own tribe, Indralorisini, within Adapidae. In 1980, Indian paleontologists S.R.K. Chopra and R.N. Vasishat placed both of Pilgrim's Sivanasua species in Indraloris and argued that Indraloris lulli, Sivanasua himalayensis and Sivanasua nagrii all represented the same species—Indraloris himalayensis. They listed Sivanasua palaeindica as a second Indraloris species, I. palaeindica, and continued to regard Indraloris as a lorisid. Gingerich and Sahni published in more detail on Sivaladapis in 1984. They then placed the two genera in a separate subfamily of Adapidae, called Sivaladapinae because that name was published two months before Indralorisini. In 1985, Vasishat continued to classify Indraloris and Sivaladapis in a single genus, and Indraloris himalayensis and Sivaladapis nagrii in a single species, but other authors have not followed this classification.

In a 1998 review, primatologist Marc Godinot recognized Sivaladapidae as a separate family within the Adapiformes, and this classification has been followed since then. Several genera in addition to Indraloris and Sivaladapis are now allocated to Sivaladapidae, which is known from the Eocene through the Miocene of China, Thailand, Myanmar, India, and Pakistan. Sivaladapids are notable for including by far the youngest adapiforms; members of this group are otherwise known mostly from the Eocene, but several sivaladapids occurred during the Miocene.

Despite these taxonomic changes, Indraloris remained known from only two specimens (the holotypes of Indraloris lulli and Sivanasua palaeindica) until 2005. Both of those specimens—an isolated first lower molar (m1) and a mandible (lower jaw) fragment with m1, respectively—come from Haritalyangar in the Nagri Formation. In 2005, however, American paleontologists Lawrence Flynn and Michèle Morgan described five teeth of Indraloris from fossil sites in the older Kamlial Formation as a second species in the genus, Indraloris kamlialensis. The species was named after the Kamlial Formation. In addition, they suggested that two lower jaw fragments from the Kamlial Formation represented a third, larger species of Indraloris.

== Description ==
Specimens of Indraloris
Specimen (Note: Abbreviations used: GSI, Geological Survey of India; YGSP, Yale–Geological Survey of Pakistan; YPM, Yale Peabody Museum.)	Organ (Note: Abbreviations used: d, deciduous; P, premolar; M, molar. Uppercase and lowercase letters refer to upper and lower teeth, respectively.)	Locality	Species	Measurements (Note: All measurements are in millimeters. Abbreviations used: L, length; W, width.)
GSI D237	Mandible fragment with m1	Haritalyangar	I. himalayensis (holotype)	Lm1: 7.0; Wm1: 5.5
YPM 13802	m1 or m2	Haritalyangar	I. himalayensis (holotype of Indraloris lulli)	L: 5.5; W: 4.3
YGSP 24338	p4	Y642	I. kamlialensis	L: 4.68; W: 2.71
YGSP 32151	dp4	Y642	I. kamlialensis	L: 4.38; W: 2.99
YGSP 33157	p3	Y682	I. kamlialensis	L: 3.67; W: 2.21
YGSP 44443	m1 or m2	Y682	I. kamlialensis (holotype)	L: >4.00; W: 3.34
YGSP 46099	M3	Y682	I. kamlialensis	L: >3.86; W: 4.35
YGSP 32152	Mandible fragment with m1	Y642	Indraloris, large sp.	Lm1: 5.78; Wm1: 4.91
YGSP 32727	Mandible fragment with left p3 and erupting right p2	Y801	Indraloris, large sp.	Lp3: 4.47; Wp3: 2.05

Indraloris is known only from isolated teeth and fragments of the mandible. These show that Indraloris was a medium-sized sivaladapid, somewhat smaller than Sivaladapis. In 1982, Gingerich and colleagues estimated that Indraloris himalayensis may have weighed 3.7 to 4.3 kg (8.2 to 9.5 lb) on the basis of allometric scaling of tooth size; Flynn and Morgan estimated a body size of about 2 kg (4.4 lb) for I. kamlialensis. In general, the cingula (shelves) on the margins of the cheekteeth are weak in Indraloris. Among the two named species, I. kamlialensis is about 20% smaller than I. himalayensis. The unnamed large Indraloris is similar in size to I. himalayensis.

The mandible is best represented by YGSP 32727, one of two specimens of the unnamed large species of Indraloris. It preserves both the right and left sides of the dentary, back to the level of the fourth lower premolars (p4), but is also damaged at the front. The jaw is deep below p4, but rapidly becomes shallower further to the front. The roots of two lower incisors and a much larger canine are preserved; the three roots cluster together, with the canine root above the incisor roots, suggesting that these teeth shared some function. The mental foramen, an opening in the jawbone, is below p4. A root for the deciduous second premolar (dp2) is preserved on both the left and right sides, but the tooth itself is not and it is not possible to determine whether dp2 had one or two roots. The right permanent second premolar (p2) is unerupted, but partially visible; it is a blade-shaped cutting tooth. The p3 bears a single cusp, somewhat anterior to the middle of the tooth, with crests descending from it towards the front and back, and weak cingula on the inner and outer sides. It is supported by two roots, which are close together.

Isolated lower premolars are known from I. kamlialensis. A p3, YGSP 33157, resembles that of YGSP 32727 in possessing a single large cusp connected to crests at the front and back. A heel is present at the back, part of a small talonid. The tooth has two roots. The p4, represented by YGSP 24338, is an elongate, two-rooted tooth with a distinct trigonid at the front and talonid at the back. The protoconid is the highest cusp of the trigonid. Two crests descend from it at right angles in a lingual direction (towards the inner side of the tooth): the protolophid towards the front, ending at the low paraconid, and the metalophid towards the back, reaching the elongate metaconid. The talonid basin is open lingually; on the labial side, the hypoconid cusp is present. A crest, the cristid obliqua, reaches from the hypoconid forward towards the trigonid. No other cusps are visible in the talonid, but the specimen is worn and poorly preserved; the posterolophid, a crest descending from the hypoconid, may end in a small hypoconulid. A weak cingulum is present on the labial side of the tooth between the protoconid and hypoconid. Another tooth, YGSP 32151, is interpreted as a dp4. It has a more closed trigonid (with the protolophid and metalophid making a more acute angle), the protolophid is shorter, and the paraconid is indistinct. In the talonid, the hypoconulid and entoconid are distinct. The labial cingulum is strong.

The lower molar of Indraloris is known from four specimens. GSI D237, an m1 in a piece of jaw, is the holotype of I. himalayensis. YPM 13802, the holotype of I. lulli (= I. himalayensis) was originally identified as an m1, but Flynn and Morgan suggested in 2005 that it may be an m2 instead. YGSP 44443, the holotype of I. kamlialensis, is either m1 or m2, but more likely the former. Part of the trigonid is broken off. YGSP 32152, a very worn m1 in a piece of jaw, represents the unnamed large Indraloris. Vasishat suggested in 1985 that these teeth were instead p4s corresponding to molars referable to Sivaladapis, but this hypothesis has been disproven by the discovery of p4s referable to Indraloris.

Indraloris molars are short and organized in two main lophs (lobes). They differ from Sivaladapis teeth in being shorter and broader, with a shorter talonid and a smaller hypoconulid. In Indraloris himalayensis lower molars, there are four main cusps (protoconid and metaconid in the trigonid, hypoconid and entoconid in the talonid), which give the crown a rectangular aspect, although the labial cusps (protoconid and hypoconid) are placed somewhat anterior to their lingual counterparts. In I. kamlialensis, the entoconid is distinct from the hypoconulid, which is large, but the tooth is otherwise similar. The cusps are high relative to those of extant lorises and approximately equal in height. The cristid obliqua, a crest, descends from the hypoconid to a point on the lingual side of the protoconid. On the hypoconid, this crest forms a right angle with the posterolophid, which runs towards the hypoconulid in the back lingual corner of the tooth. Between the metaconid and entoconid, the talonid basin is open. In I. himalayensis at least (the structure is damaged in the only known lower molar of I. kamlialensis) there is a well-developed hollow in the trigonid in front of the protoconid and metaconid. There is a labial cingulum between the protoconid and hypoconid. YGSP 32152 is so worn that little of its structure remains visible. It shows a short trigonid and a distinct entoconid. A small hypoconulid, close to the entoconid, is suggested by an enamel swelling. This specimen is fragmentary enough that it could also represent a catarrhine primate or a carnivoran.

The only known upper tooth of Indraloris is an M3, YGSP 46009. It is broken at the back labial corner. The main cusp is protocone; among the other two cusps, the paracone is higher but the metacone larger. There is a spur at the back of the protocone, suggesting a rudimentary hypocone. The protocone is connected to the paracone by a protoloph, which lacks a small cusp (the paraconule). No crest connects the protocone to the metacone, but there is a cingulum at the back margin of the tooth. The tooth bears a strong parastyle (accessory cusp at the front labial corner) and has three roots.

== Distribution and ecology ==
Fossils of Indraloris have been found only in the Miocene Siwalik fossil beds of India and Pakistan. I. himalayensis is known only from Haritalyangar, a Late Miocene site in the Indian state of Himachal Pradesh. This site has been dated to about 9 million years ago. This site has also yielded Sivaladapis nagrii. Indraloris kamlialensis is known from two sites in the province of Punjab, Pakistan, that are both dated to 15.2 million years ago: Y642 and Y682. Sivaladapis palaendicus has also been recorded at both sites, and two lorisids are known from Y682. The unnamed large Indraloris is known from Y642 and an older site, Y801 (16.8 million years old). All are in the Potwar Plateau region.

Little is known about sivaladapid ecology. Gingerich and Sahni suggested that Indraloris was probably arboreal and that it may have been more frugivorous (eating fruit) than Sivaladapis, which they interpreted as a folivore (leaf-eater). Flynn and Morgan interpreted I. kamlialensis as a mixed feeder. The Late Miocene extinction of Indian sivaladapids may be related to a decline in forest cover in Asia and to competition by immigrating colobine monkeys.
