= Vinayakia =

Vinayakia Temporal range: Miocene

Scientific classification
- Kingdom: Animalia
- Phylum: Chordata
- Class: Mammalia
- Mirorder: Ferae
- Genus: †Vinayakia; Pilgrim, 1932

Type species
- Vinayakia nocturna Pilgrim, 1932

Other Species
- Vinayakia intermedia Prasad, 1963; Vinayakia sarcophaga Pilgrim, 1932

Extinct genus of mammal

Vinayakia is a chimeric genus of ferae with three species: Vinayakia nocturna, the type species, Vinayakia intermedia, and Vinayakia sarcophaga. All three species were based on fossils collected from the Miocene-aged Nagri and Chinji Formations of the Siwaliks in India and Pakistan.

== History and naming ==
The genus Vinayakia was erected by British paleontologist Guy Ellcock Pilgrim in 1932 for two equally new species: Vinayakia nocturna, the type species, and Vinayakia sarcophaga. V. nocturna was described based a right mandibular ramus (GSI-D 221) collected from the Nagri Formation two miles northeast of Kadirpur in the Attock District of the Salt Range. An additional fossil, a partial right maxilla (GSI-D 218) collected near Bahitta in the Jhelum District of the Salt Range, was also described and referred to the species. V. sarcophaga was based on an associated left and right maxillae (GSI-D 217) collected by Vinayak Rao from the Chinji Formation south of Kotal Kund in the Jelum District. The genus name Vinayakia honored of Rao Bahadur M. Vinayak Bao, a colleague of Pilgrim, in appreciation of his work with Siwalik fossils; no etymologies were given for the species names.

A third species, Vinayakia intermedia, was described in 1963 based on fossils from the Nagri Formation in the Haritalyangar area.

In a 2025 review of Siwalik carnivorans, Barry considers the remains used to describe Vinayakia to belong to non-felids, with GSI D 221 being referred to an intermediate hyaenid, and the two maxillae likely to a medium-sized hyaenodont. Though he never mentioned Vinayakia intermedia, or reclassifed it.

== Description ==
Pilgrim described V. nocturna as an extremely large cat, midway between a tiger and a leopard in size, and V. sarcophaga as similar in size to V. nocturna.

== Classification ==
Pilgrim theorized that Vinayakia represented an aberrant line descended from Proailurus, with V. sarcophaga ancestral to V. nocturna. He further considered Mellivorodon palaeindicus a direct, degenerate descendant of Vinayakia, and associated with Vinayakia another specimen GSI-D 220, a fragmentary upper first molar that he described in the same paper as an indeterminate felid, due to it being similar in shape to equivalent teeth in Proailurus but agreeing in size with V. nocturna. He classified Vinayakia as part of the felid subfamily Proailurinae.

Edwin Colbert, in 1935, followed Pilgrim's classification of Vinayakia as a proailurine, but considered the genus "of little value" due to the fragmentary nature of the fossils.

In 2025, Barry has stated that Vinayakia nocturna is a chimera of hyaenid and hyaenodont remains, with Vinayakia sarcophaga being morphologically similar to a hyaenodont.
