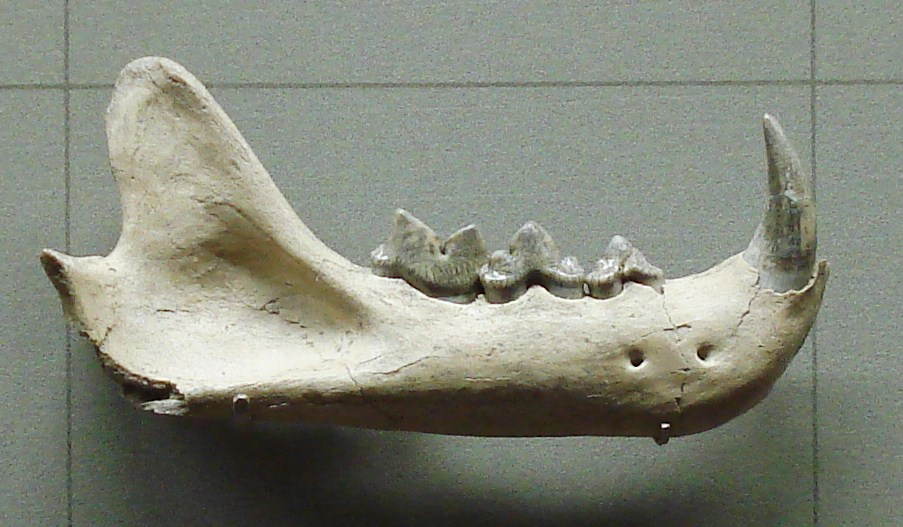
- Pseudaelurus jawbone from the Staatliches Museum für Naturkunde Stuttgart, Germany

Scientific classification
- Kingdom: Animalia
- Phylum: Chordata
- Class: Mammalia
- Order: Carnivora
- Family: Felidae
- Grade: †Pseudaelurus; Gervais, 1850

Type species
- †Pseudaelurus quadridentatus (Blainville, 1843) sensu Gervais, 1850

Other Species
- †P. cuspidatus Wang et al., 1998; †P. guangheensis Cao et al., 1990

Synonyms
- P. quadridentatus: Felis quadridentata Blainville, 1843

= Pseudaelurus =

Pseudaelurus Temporal range: Miocene

Extinct genus of carnivores

Pseudaelurus is a prehistoric cat that lived in Europe, Asia and North America in the Miocene between approximately twenty and eight million years ago. It is considered to be a paraphyletic grade ancestral to living felines and pantherines as well as the extinct machairodonts (saber-tooths), and is a successor to Proailurus. It originated from Eurasia and was the first cat to reach North America, when it entered the continent at about 18.5 Ma ending a 'cat-gap' of 7 million years. The slender proportions of the animal, together with its short, viverrid-like legs, suggest that it may have been an agile climber of trees.

== Taxonomy and phylogeny ==
Location of Pseudaelurus grade fossils based on Paleobiology Database.
- †Pseudaelurus
- †Styriofelis
- †Hyperailurictis
- now assigned to †Afrosmilus within the family †Nimravidae

Traditionally, all the Pseudaelurus-grade species from Europe, Asia, and North America have been assigned to a single genus, even though the paraphyletic nature of the group has often been noted. Several authorities have split Pseudaelurus into separate genera or subgenera, including Hyperailurictis, Styriofelis, Miopanthera and Schizailurus. These different groups of Pseudaelurus-grade felids are often considered to have given rise to later felid lineages.

The genus Styriofelis was originally proposed in 1929 by Kretzoi for the species Pseudaelurus turnaeunsis. Kretzoi also proposed the genus Hyperailurictis for the North American species Pseudaelurus intrepidus, and Miopanthera for Ps. lorteti. In 1964, Beaumont elaborated on Kretzoi's proposal and split Pseudaelurus into three separate genera: Pseudaelurus for the European Ps. quadridentatus, Schizailurus for Ps. lorteti, and Hyperailurictis for Ps. intrepidus.

=== Taxonomic history ===
In 1843, the paleontologist H.M. de Blainville published a description of a felid cranium and lower jaw fragment from Sansan, France. He assigned these fossils to a new species, Felis quadridentata. The cranium was later reassigned to another species, but in 1850 the lower jaw fragment was assigned to a new genus by Paul Gervais as Pseudaelurus quadridentatus, due to having certain primitive features.

In 1858, Joseph Leidy described the species Felis intrepidus, from North America, and reassigned the species as Pseudaelurus intrepidus in 1869. After that discovery, another eight species of Pseudaelurus would be described in North America, but only five are still considered valid.

In 1872, Henri Filhol described the species Pseudaelurus edwardsi from France, but the species was reassigned to the nimravid genus Eofelis in 2000.

In 1882, a second species from Europe was described as Pseudaelurus turauensis, and a third species, Pseudaelurus lorteti, in 1899. The fourth European species, Pseudaelurus romieviensis, was described in 1934. In addition, the species Pseudaelurus transitorius was described in 1892, but most later authors considered it a synonym of P. turnaeunsis.

In 1914, fossils from Africa were described and assigned to the species Pseudaelurus africanus. However, the species was later reassigned, first to the genus Metailurus, and then finally to Afrosmilus.

In Asia, the first description of Pseudaelurus was in 1910, when a fragmentary fossil was assigned to Pseudaelurus chinjiensis; however, it was reassigned in 1915 to the new genus Sivaelurus. The next appearance of Pseudaelurus-grade felids in Asia wasn't until 1986, when a lower jaw fragment and some dental fragments were assigned to the species Pseudaelurus lorteti. In 1990, the species Pseudaelurus guangheensis was described. In 1998, a second Asian species, Pseudaelurus cuspidatus, was also described. Both of the Asian species are known only from fragmentary fossils.

In 1998, while measuring fragmentary fossils from the Hsanda-Gol locality in Mongolia, Robert Hunt referred a lower jaw fragment to Proailurus sp.; while this was reassigned to the nimravid genus Eofelis in 1999 instead, a 2004 review of felid material from other localities in Mongolia suggested that it could belong to Pseudaelurus cuspidatus instead, on basis of having similar features. However, the Hsanda-Gol specimen is dated back to the Oligocene, while Pseudaelurus cuspidatus is found solely in Miocene-aged localities. The same paper also described a pair of fragments (a lower jaw fragment and a metapodial) and attributed them to Pseudaelurus sp.

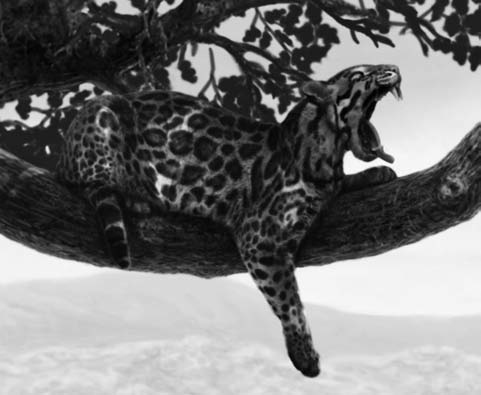
Restoration of P. quadridentatus by Mauricio Antón

In 2010, a review of the Felidae as a whole suggested that Pseudaelurus be split into three genera: Hyperailurictis for the five North American species, Styriofelis for two of the European species (P. lorteti and P. turnaunensis), and Pseudaelurus sensu stricto for P. quadridentatus. The status of P. romieviensis, P. guangheensis, and P. cuspidatus was given as uncertain. In addition, Miopanthera and Schizailurus were recognized as junior synonyms of Styriofelis.

In 2012, a new species Styriofelis vallesiensis was described based on a specimen found in Spain. However, a review of the species in 2017 concluded that it was sufficiently different from other Styriofelis species as to require a separate genus. It was thus reassigned to the new genus Leptofelis as Leptofelis vallesiensis.

In 2017, a review of the species Felis pamiri, which was named based on a snout fragment from Turkey and dated to the late Miocene, concluded that Felis pamiri and Pseudaelurus lorteti were likely closely related to each other, and ancestral to the Panthera lineage. Both species were reassigned to the genus Miopanthera as Miopanthera lorteti and Miopanthera pamiri.

=== Phylogeny ===
The following cladogram is based on Piras et al. (2013) and illustrates the three more derived lineages that evolved from "Pseudaelurus" species.

- Felidae
  - †Proailurus
    Proailurinae
    - †Proailurus bourbonnensis
    - †Proailurus lemanensis
    - †Proailurus major
  - "Pseudaelurus" (grade)
    - Pseudaelurus lineage
      - †Pseudaelurus
        - †Pseudaelurus quadridentatus
        - †Pseudaelurus cuspidatus
        - †Pseudaelurus guangheensis
      - †Machairodontinae
    - †Hyperailurictis
      Hyperailurictis lineage
      - †Hyperailurictis intrepidus
      - †Hyperailurictis marshi
      - †Hyperailurictis stouti
      - †Hyperailurictis validus
      - †Hyperailurictis skinneri
    - †Sivaelurus
      †Sivaelurus chinjiensis
    - Styriofelis lineage
      - †Styriofelis
        - †Styriofelis turnauensis
        - †Styriofelis romieviensis
      - Felinae sensu lato
        - Felinae
        - - †Miopanthera
            - †Miopanthera lorteti
            - †Miopanthera pamiri
          - Pantherinae

== Description ==
Pseudaelurus quadridentatus weighed about 30 kg (66 lb) and was approximately the size of a cougar.

== Distribution ==
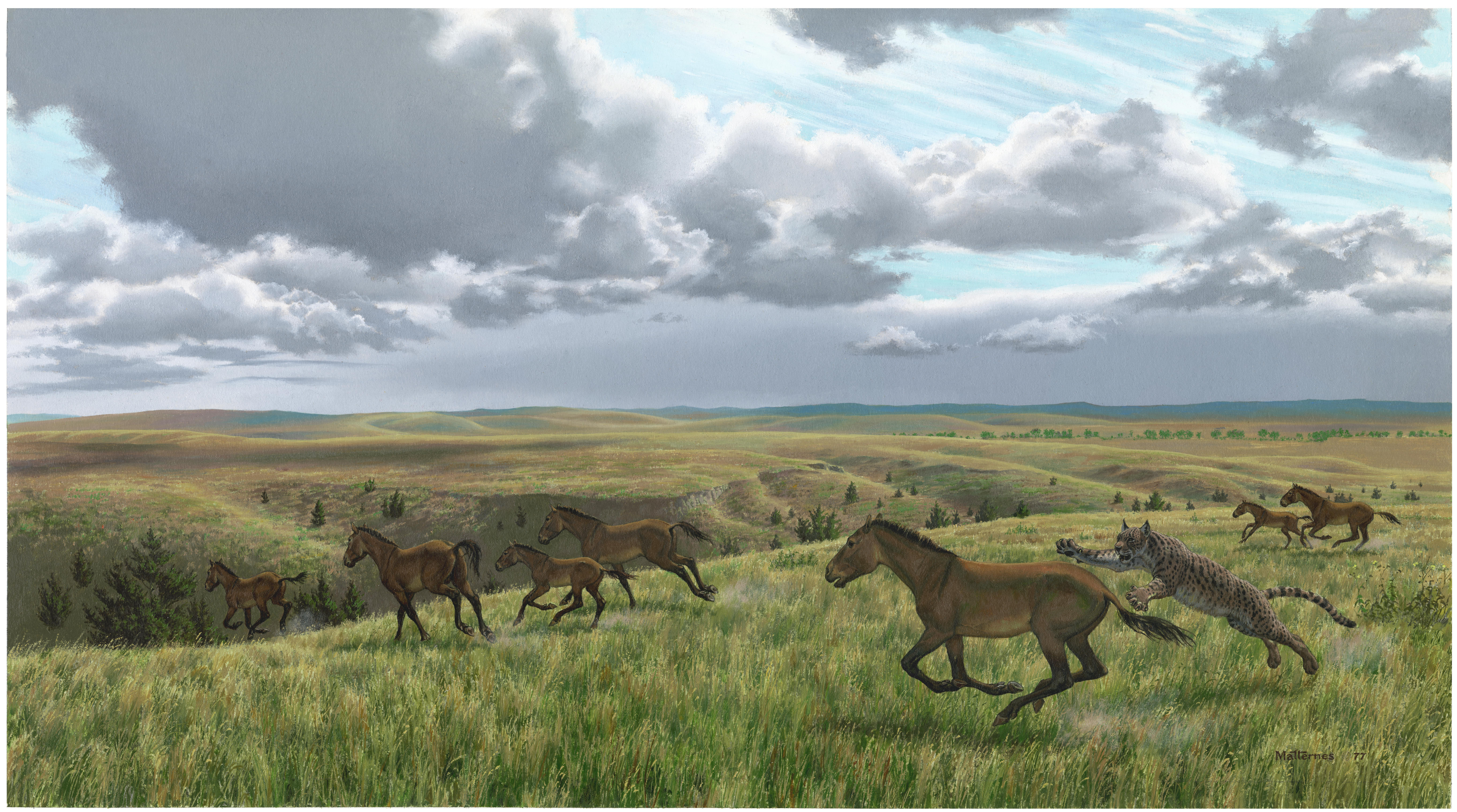
Restoration of Pseudaelurus chasing Merychippus

Pseudaelurus guangheensis from the middle Miocene of Gansu (China) and Pseudaelurus cuspidatus from the middle Miocene of Xinjiang (China) are reported.
