= Sivaladapinae =

Sivaladapinae Temporal range: Middle to Late Miocene

Scientific classification
- Kingdom: Animalia
- Phylum: Chordata
- Class: Mammalia
- Order: Primates
- Suborder: Strepsirrhini
- Family: †Sivaladapidae
- Subfamily: †Sivaladapinae; Thomas & Verma, 1979

Genera
- †Indraloris; †Sinoadapis; †Sivaladapis

Extinct subfamily of mammals

Sivaladapinae is a subfamily of adapiform primate that lived in Asia during the middle to late Miocene.
