= Sivaladapis =

Sivaladapis Temporal range: Middle Miocene 13.7–11.1 Ma

Scientific classification
- Kingdom: Animalia
- Phylum: Chordata
- Class: Mammalia
- Order: Primates
- Suborder: Strepsirrhini
- Family: †Sivaladapidae
- Subfamily: †Sivaladapinae
- Genus: †Sivaladapis; Gingerich & Sahni 1979

Type species
- †Sivaladapis palaeindicus Gingerich & Sahni 1979

Species
- †S. nagrii Prasad 1970; †S. palaeindicus Pilgrim 1932

Extinct genus of primates

Sivaladapis is a genus of adapiform primate that lived in Asia during the middle Miocene.

Sivaladapis is an extinct, adapiform primate genus that belongs to the family Sivaladapidae. Two species of Sivaladapis are currently recognized, S. nagrii and S. palaeindicus. Sivaladapis is considered one of the latest surviving genera of adapiform primates, existing well into the Miocene of South Asia. Compared to other adapiform primates, the fossil record of Sivaladapis is limited, lacking any cranial or postcranial fossil material. The genus is known exclusively from isolated fossil teeth and partial dentaries and maxillae recovered from the Chinji Formation (Siwalik Group) of India and Pakistan.

Both S. nagrii and S. palaeindicus are considered a fairly large adapiforms, with body-size estimates ranging from 2.6 to 3.4 kilograms. The prominent and well-developed shearing crests on its molars and premolars suggests the genus was adapted to a predominately folivorous diet, subsisting on fibrous leaves. It has been hypothesized that the extinction of Sivaladapis around 8 million years ago was the result of the immigration of leaf-eating colobine monkeys to South Asia, where they directly competed with Sivaladapis.

== Etymology ==
Sival- refers to the Middle Siwalik deposits of the Indian subcontinent, -adapis referring to the type genus of Adapiformes.

== History of discovery and identification ==
The fossiliferous Siwalik deposits of India and Pakistan have been known to paleontologists for decades, producing a plethora of vertebrate fossils since the early 20th Century. In 1932, British paleontologist Guy E. Pilgrim described what he identified as a procyonid carnivore partial dentary collected from Lower Siwalik deposits of Pakistan, naming it Sivanasua palaeindica. In his description, he identified a maximum of two lower molars, which informed his identification of the fossil as having procyonid affinities. Shortly after Pilgrim's description, G.E. Lewis of the Yale Peabody Museum recovered a single lower molar from the Nargi horizon in Middle Siwalik deposits of India. He recognized the morphology of the isolated tooth as having lorisid primate affinity and named it Indraloris lulli; however, he lacked sufficient fossil material to make adequate anatomical comparisons or place it systematically. In the 1960s, Ian Tattersall of the American Museum of Natural History recognized the similarity in morphology shared between Sivanasua and Indraloris.

Additional fossil material of Sivanasua recovered from Middle Siwalik deposits of India in the 1970s allowed for more direct comparison of Indraloris and Sivanasua. These additional fossils demonstrated that the dental formula of Sivanasua included a maximum of three lower molars, not two as Pilgrim had initially described; a diagnostic feature of procyonid carnivores is the loss of M3, resulting in a lower dental formula including only 2 lower molars. Moreover, additional Indraloris material lacked key synapomorphies aligning it with lorisid primates (e.g., a toothcomb), which pointed to an adapiform affinity instead. Thus, the additional fossils and subsequent anatomical comparisons demonstrated that 1) Sivanasua was not a procyonid carnivore, but rather showed adapiform affinities, and 2) the Sivanasua and Indraloris are closely related but represent two distinct adapiform genera. Acknowledging its adapiform affinities, Gingerich and Sahni renamed the previously identified Sivanasua material as Sivaladapis and recognized two distinct species – S. nagrii (formerly Sivanasua nagrii) and S. palaeindicus (formerly Sivanasua palaeindica).

== Taxonomy ==
In the same year that Gingerich and Sahni recognized the two species of Sivaladapis, Thomas and Verma placed S. narigii, S. palaeindicus, and the species belonging to the genus Indraloris in their own subfamily, Sivaladapinae, which was later promoted to the family level, Sivaladapidae. Gingerich and Sahni assigned S. nagrii as the type species for the genus. The holotype for S. nagrii is represented by a partial right dentary that preserves M1-M3 (GSI 18093) collected from the Middle Siwaliks Nagri formation near Haritalyangar, India. The holotype for S. palaeindicus is represented by a partial right dentary preserving P4 and M2-M3 (GSI D-224) collected from the Lower Siwaliks Chinji formation near Chinji, Pakistan. Roughly 10 million years after the mass extinction event at the Cretaceous-Paleogene boundary that eliminated many organisms, including the non-avian dinosaurs, adapiform primates appear simultaneously in the fossil record of the Holarctic along with many other mammalian lineages that rapidly evolved and diversified. Adapiform and omomyid primates are the first true primates appearing in the earliest Eocene around 55 million years ago.

Within the broader adapiform radiation, Sivaladapidae represents a monophyletic group containing several genera and species with synapomorphies distinguishing them from other recognized adapiform families. Key features differentiating sivaladapids from other adapiforms include upper molar shearing crests, the twinning of the hypolconulid and entoconid on the lower molars, and a continuous lingual cingulum on the upper molars. Within Sivaladapidae, three subfamilies are currently recognized: Hoangniinae, Wailekiinae, and Sivaladapinae. While these subfamilies are distinguished by containing sivaladapid genera that exclusively share distinct morphology (inherited from a more recent common ancestor), the subfamilies also follow a general sequence of geologic age. For example, hoanghoniines are restricted to the Eocene, while the sivaladapiines are found exclusively from Miocene deposits. In 1998, Qi and Beard recovered new sivaladapid fossils from the Late Eocene Gongkang Formation in China that they named Guangxilemur, which they described as intermediate in morphology and age. In their phylogenetic analysis, Guangxilemur is recovered in an intermediate position between the Eocene hoanghoniines and the Miocene sivaldapiines.

While much research has focused on resolving the evolutionary relationships within Sivaladapidae, the phylogenetic affinities within the broader adapiform radiation are still unclear.

== Description ==
Derived features of Sivaladapis include the following traits. Sivaladapis has a dental formula of 2.1.3.3/2.1.3.3. The upper premolars become more molarized from front to back, and the cusps become more numerous and complex in their morphology as well. P2 is single rooted, P3 is double rooted, and P4 has three roots. The upper molars display shearing crests with a sharp ectoloph that is supported by well-developed, distinct stylar cusps that are connected via a buccal cingulum. A prominent lingual cingulum surrounds the protocone. There is no hypocone or pericone.

Unlike early Eocene hoanghoniines, Sivaladapis is derived in having a fused mandible. Lower incisors are high-crowned and spatulate, and I2 is slightly larger than I1. Size differences between the few preserved lower canines in Sivaladapis suggests possible sexual dimorphism in the genus. P2 is single rooted and caniniform with a honing facet for the upper canine. P3 is double rooted with a prominent protoconid with a paracristid that orients anteriorly. Accessory crests run from the protoconid and curve at the base of the crown to short talonid. P4 is completely molarized but lacks an entoconid and has an open trigonid. The lower molars of Sivaladapis are extremely high-crowned with several prominent crests. The paraconids are reduced but crest-like, while the entoconids take on a pointed shape.

== Paleoecology ==
Given its dental morphology (i.e., the upper and lower molar cusps and crests that facilitate a combination of puncturing and shearing during occlusion), it has been inferred that Sivaladapis was well-adapted to a highly folivorous diet of fibrous leaves. Moreover, the absence of the hypocone suggests that grinding was not a functional priority for Sivaladapis. Additionally, Sivaladapis fossils have been recovered in association with a gibbon-sized hominoid, suggesting the taxa inhabited a forest community. This faunal association, along with the large body size estimates and dental morphology, suggests that Sivaladapis was an arboreal folivore. Specifically, citing Kay's threshold, in which the upper limit for an insectivorous primate is around 500 grams, the body mass estimates for Sivaladapis falling between 2.6 and 3.4 kg is used as evidence to support the hypothesis that Sivaladapis was a folivore. However, this hypothesis remains to be tested more vigorously with additional fossil material.
