= Lushius =

Lushius Temporal range: Late Eocene

Scientific classification
- Domain: Eukaryota
- Kingdom: Animalia
- Phylum: Chordata
- Class: Mammalia
- Order: Primates
- Suborder: Strepsirrhini
- Family: †Sivaladapidae
- Genus: †Lushius; Chow, 1961
- Species: †L. qinlinensis

Binomial name
- †Lushius qinlinensis Chow, 1961

Extinct genus of primates

Lushius is a genus of adapiform primate that lived in China during the late Eocene, and is classified under the subfamily Hoanghoniinae.
