= Wailekia =

Wailekia Temporal range: Late Eocene

Scientific classification
- Domain: Eukaryota
- Kingdom: Animalia
- Phylum: Chordata
- Class: Mammalia
- Order: Primates
- Suborder: Strepsirrhini
- Family: †Sivaladapidae
- Genus: †Wailekia; Ducrocq et al., 1995
- Species: †W. orientale

Binomial name
- †Wailekia orientale Ducrocq et al., 1995

Extinct genus of primates

Wailekia is a genus of adapiform primate that lived in Asia during the late Eocene.
