= Siamoadapis =

Siamoadapis Temporal range: Middle Miocene

Scientific classification
- Domain: Eukaryota
- Kingdom: Animalia
- Phylum: Chordata
- Class: Mammalia
- Order: Primates
- Suborder: Strepsirrhini
- Family: †Sivaladapidae
- Genus: †Siamoadapis; Chaimanee et al., 2007
- Species: †S. maemohensis

Binomial name
- †Siamoadapis maemohensis Chaimanee et al., 2007

Extinct genus of primates

Siamoadapis is an extinct genus of adapiform primate. Remains of its only known species, Siamoadapis maemohensis, were found in Thailand.

The fossils were discovered in the lignite layer of a coal mine in Mae Mo district, Lampang Province, northern Thailand, from which it also received its scientific species name. Four lower jaws with teeth were unearthed by a joint team of Thai and French geologists in 2004. It was dated to be 13.1 to 13.3 million years old, and described in 2007 by a team led by geologist Yaowalak Chaimanee (เยาวลักษณ์ ชัยมณี) from the Department of Mineral Resources, Thailand.

The animal was a very small primate, with a body length of 15 centimetres and estimated to have weighted 500 grams. Distinct for the species is the small size and differences in dentition compared to other Miocene sivaladapids.
