= Ramadapis =

Ramadapis sahnii

Scientific classification
- Domain: Eukaryota
- Kingdom: Animalia
- Phylum: Chordata
- Class: Mammalia
- Order: Primates
- Suborder: Strepsirrhini
- Family: †Sivaladapidae
- Genus: †Ramadapis
- Species: †R. sahnii

Binomial name
- †Ramadapis sahnii Gilbert and Patel et al 2017

Prehistoric genus of primate

Ramadapis sahnii was a primitive primate belonging to Sivaladapidae that existed around 11 to 14 million years ago (Early to Mid-Miocene). Only a mandible (a lower jaw bone) was found at the dig site, which was near Ramnagar in Udhampur district in Jammu and Kashmir specifically the lower Siwalik deposits. The jawbone indicates that Ramadapis resembled a modern day ring-tailed lemur. The early lemur was named after Ashok Sahni, who discovered the first sivaladapid in the Siwalik deposits. The mandible was only around one and a quarter inch long, which led scientists to assume that it was only around 11 pounds.

== Ecology ==
The environment that Ramadapis sahnii lived in is highly disputed upon. It has been hypothesized to either be a woodland, a grassland with few trees, a humid tropical forest, and finally a sort of half grassland and woodland.
