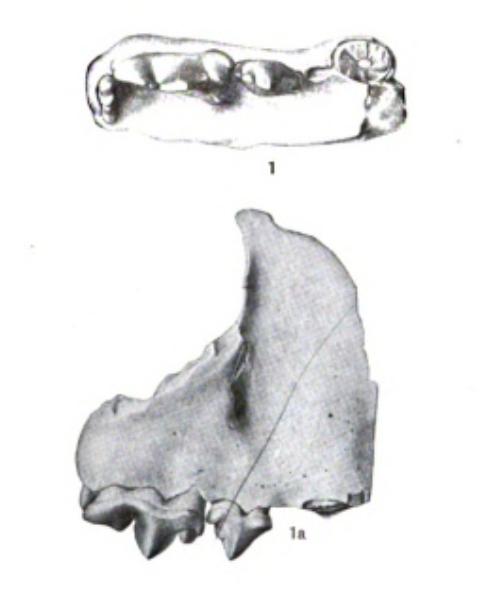
- The holotype of Sivaelurus chinjiensis as depicted by Pilgrim (1915).

Scientific classification
- Kingdom: Animalia
- Phylum: Chordata
- Class: Mammalia
- Order: Carnivora
- Family: Felidae
- Genus: †Sivaelurus; Pilgrim, 1913

Type species
- †Sivaelurus chinjiensis (Pilgrim, 1910)
- Map showing the location of the Chinji locality in Punjab, Pakistan.

Synonyms
- S. chinjiensis: Pseudaelurus chinjiensis Pilgrim, 1910; Aeluropsis chinjiensis (Pilgrim, 1910) sensu Matthew, 1929

= Sivaelurus =

Sivaelurus Temporal range: Miocene

Extinct genus of carnivores

Sivaelurus is a fossil genus of felid containing only a single species, S. chinjiensis, which was described based on a partial right maxilla collected from the Chinji Formation in the Lower Siwaliks. The species was originally described by Guy Ellcock Pilgrim as Pseudaelurus chinjiensis in 1910, who later erected a new genus, Sivaelurus, for it in 1913.

== History and naming ==
The holotype specimen, GSI-D 150, was collected from the Chinji Formation at the Chinji type locality in the Salt Range. It was described as the type and only specimen of the new species Pseudaelurus chinjiensis by British paleontologist Guy Ellcock Pilgrim in 1910. In 1913, however, he provisionally erected a new genus Sivaelurus for the species in a footnote of a broader paper. The genus and species Sivaelurus chinjiensis was more formally described in 1915, and a second specimen- a partial left ramus- from the same location and of similar size as GSI-D 150 was described and assigned to S. chinjiensis as well.

In 1929, American paleontologist W. D. Matthew suggested that S. chinjiensis be assigned to the genus Aeluropsis and stated that the second specimen, the partial ramus, was distinctly machaerodont while the holotype was distinctly feline, and that the two were unlikely to belong to the same genus and species. In that same year, Hungarian paleontologist Miklos Kretzoi reached the same conclusion regarding the ramus and used it as the holotype for another species and genus, Sivasmilus copei. The reassignment of the ramus was acknowledged and agreed with by Pilgrim in 1932, who wrote that he had sought to avoid establishing an ill-defined genus when he assigned it to Sivaelurus; the suggested reassignment of S. chinjiensis to Aeluropsis was not followed by Pilgrim nor other researchers.

A 2018 study noted that the mandible fragment seemed to fit the holotype of Sivaelurus quite well.

A 2020 study of newfound material from the region suggested that the species Miopanthera lorteti be reassigned to this genus; it also described fragmentary material referable to Sivaelurus sp. This reassignment, with the accompanying synonymy of Miopanthera, was followed by another study in 2023, which also transferred Miopanthera' second species "M." pamiri to the new genus Palaeopanthera.

== Description ==
The holotype of Sivaelurus chinjiensis is a nearly complete right maxilla with five teeth (the second through fourth premolars, the first molar, and the canine) attached, as well as the base of the jugal bone and the front edge of the orbit.

== Classification ==
Pilgrim, in the 1915 description of the genus, considered it similar to various species of Paramachaerodus based on some features, but similar to felines, specifically Felis nebulosa (the modern clouded leopard), based on others. He proposed that Sivaelurus was ancestral to Felis nebulosa.

Matthew in 1929 considered the species a feline based on the holotype and rejected Pilgrim's proposal that it was ancestral to F. nebulosa, while Kretzoi placed Sivaelurus in the subfamily Acinonychinae alongside the cheetah genus Acinonyx. Pilgrim in 1932 agreed with Matthew regarding Sivaelurus as a feline, considering Kretzoi's placement of Sivaelurus in Acinonychinae poorly-founded.
