= Styriofelis =

Styriofelis Temporal range: Miocene, 20–9.5 Ma

Scientific classification
- Kingdom: Animalia
- Phylum: Chordata
- Class: Mammalia
- Order: Carnivora
- Family: Felidae
- Grade: †Pseudaelurus
- Genus: †Styriofelis; Kretzoi, 1929a

Type species
- †Styriofelis turnauensis Hoernes, 1882

Other Species
- ?†Styriofelis romieviensis (Roman & Viret, 1934)

Synonyms
- Miopanthera Kretzoi, 1938; Schizailurus Viret, 1951; S. turnauensis: S. transitorius Deperet, 1892

Extinct genus of carnivores

Styriofelis is an extinct genus of Felidae known from the Miocene of Europe.

== Taxonomy ==
In 1882, a species of Pseudaelurus from Europe was described as Pseudaelurus turnauensis. Another species, Pseudaelurus lorteti, was described in 1899. The species Pseudaelurus transitorius was described in 1892, but most authors considered it a synonym of P. turnauensis.

In 1929, Kretzoi proposed the genus Styriofelis for P. turnauensis, but this proposal was largely ignored. Kretzoi also proposed the genus Miopanthera for P. lorteti, but Beaumont, during his proposal of splitting Pseudaelurus, ignored Kretzoi and placed the two species in his own genus Schizailurus. Subsequently, Schizailurus has been considered a junior synonym of both Styriofelis and Miopanthera.

In 2010, a review of the family Felidae suggested that Pseudaelurus be split into three separate genera, including Styriofelis for P. turnauensis and P. lorteti. The status of Pseudaelurus romieviensis, the fourth European species, was left uncertain due to the fragmentary state of the specimens assigned to it.

In 2012, a new species of Pseudaelurus-grade felid found in Spain was described as Styriofelis vallesiensis. In 2017, however, a review of the species concluded that it was sufficiently different as to require a separate genus, and was reassigned to the new genus Leptofelis as Leptofelis vallesiensis.

Also in 2017, a review of the species Felis pamiri concluded that F. pamiri and S. lorteti were closely related, and were also distinct enough to both be reassigned to the genus Miopanthera.

Fossil discoveries of Styriofelis turnauensis from the late Middle Miocene site of Abocador de Can Mata in Spain have expanded the known geographic range of the species within the Iberian Peninsula, distinguishing it from closely related species such as S. lorteti and S. vallesiensis based on dental morphology (Robles et al., 2013).
