= Chinji Formation =

Geological formation

- Stratigraphic range: Late Miocene, Tortonian 9.44 –7.25 Ma
- Type: Geologic formation
- Underlies: Kamlial Formation
- Overlies: Nagri Formation

Lithology
- Primary: Claystone
- Other: Sand

Location
- Region: Siwalik Hills
- Country: Pakistan, India

Type section
- Named for: Tatrot Village, Pakistan
- Chinji Formation (Pakistan)

The Chinji formation is a Miocene Geologic formation form the Siwalik hills of India and Pakistan. An abundance if mammal fossils are known from the region.

== Fossil Content ==
=== Reptiles ===
==== Crocodillians ====
A crocodile egg was found in the formation

Genus	Species	Family	Material	Locality	Notes	Images
Crocodilus	C. palaeindicus	Crocodylidae				
Gavialis	G. pachyrhynchus	Gavialidae	Partial skulls	Laki Hills (may not belong to Chinji formation)	Very large similar to Rhamphosuchus crassidens, likely separate genus from Gavialis	
Gavialis	G. curvirostris	Gavialidae	Partial skull	Laki Hills (may not belong to Chinji formation)	Possibly a tomistominae likely separate genus from Gavialis	

==== Squamates ====
Genus	Species	Family	Material	Locality	Notes	Images
Acrochordus	A. dehmi	Acrochordidae		Mochiwala	A gigantic file snake	
Python	P. sp	Pythonidae	A single vertebrae			

=== Mammals ===
==== Proboscideans ====
Genus	Species	Family	Material	Locality	Notes	Images
Protanancus	P. chinjiensis	Amebelodontidae	Molars and mandibular remains	West of Chinji Rest House, Chinji Type locality.		
Choerolophodon	C. corrugatus	Choerolophodontidae	Molars and mandibular remains	Chinji Type locality		
Prodeinotherium	P. pentapotamiae	Deinotheriidae		Chinji Type locality	Formerly considered a species of Deinotherium	
Gomphotherium	G. browni	Gomphotheriidae	Partial skull	Chinji type locaity		
Stegolophodon	S. cautleyi	Stegodontidae	Teeth	lower Chinji		

==== Primates ====
Genus	Species	Family	Material	Locality	Notes	Images
Sivapithecus	S. indicus	Hominidae	Partial skeletons	Localities Y647, Y494, Y496: Mid Chinji Upper third?		
Sivapithecus	S. simonsi?	Hominidae	Jaw fragment and teeth	Uppermost Chinji?	Type specimen now lost, well photographed	
Sivaladapis	S. paleindicus	Sivaladapidae	Teeth			

==== Hyaenodonts ====
Genus	Species	Family	Material	Locality	Notes	Images
Dissopsalis	D. carnifex	Teratodontidae	Skull remains and teeth			
Metapterodon?		Hyainailouridae	hemimandible	Lower Chinji		
?Megistotherium/Hyainailouros sp.		Hyainailouridae	Tooth	Dhok Bun Ameer Khatoon locality: Lower Chinji	Similar in size to Hyainailouros sulzeri	
Hyaenodon	cf. H. pervagus	Hyaenodontidae		Kanhatti Locality	Similar to Oligocene hyaenodont remains not referred to this species due to age	

==== Carnivorans ====
Genus	Species	Family	Material	Locality	Notes	Images
Amphicyon	A. palaeindicus	Amphicyonidae				
aff. Magericyon	aff. M. sp	Amphicyonidae				
Vishnucyon	V. chinjiensis	Amphicyonidae				
Sansanosmilus	S. rhomboidalis	Barbourofelidae	Teeth and Maxilia			
Sansanosmilus	S. serratus	Barbourofelidae	Teeth and mandibular remains		Possibly distinct in morphology form S. rhomboidalis but Barbourofelid tooth morphology can be variable between individuals	
