= Hyperailurictis =

Hyperailurictis Temporal range: Miocene, 17.5–12.7 Ma

Scientific classification
- Kingdom: Animalia
- Phylum: Chordata
- Class: Mammalia
- Order: Carnivora
- Family: Felidae
- Grade: †Pseudaelurus
- Genus: †Hyperailurictis; Kretzoi, 1929

Type species
- †Hyperailurictis intrepidus (Leidy, 1858)

Other species
- †H. marshi (Thorpe, 1922); †H. skinneri (Rothwell, 2003); †H. stouti (Schultz & Martin, 1972); †H. validus (Rothwell, 2001)

Synonyms
- H. intrepidus: Felis intrepidus Leidy, 1858; Pseudaelurus intrepidus (Leidy, 1869); H. marshi: Pseudaelurus marshi Thorpe, 1922; Pseudaelurus aeluroides Macdonald, 1954; H. skinneri: Pseudaelurus skinneri Rothwell, 2003; H. stouti: Lynx stouti Schultz & Martin, 1972; Pseudaelurus stouti (Rothwell, 2003); H. validus: Pseudaelurus validus Rothwell, 2001

Genus of extinct felid

Hyperailurictis is an extinct genus of felid from Miocene North America. The Hyperailurictis species are Pseudaelurus-grade felids and thought to be the first felids in the Americas.

== Taxonomy and evolution ==
=== Taxonomic history ===
In 1858, the paleontologist Joseph Leidy described a new species of cat, Felis intrepidus, based on lower jaw fragments (a left ramus, described, and a right ramus, mentioned only and now lost) found somewhere in Nebraska near the Niobrara river. The fragments were later determined to have come from the lower Valentine Formation, making them late Barstovian in age. Leidy reassigned the specimens to Pseudaelurus as Pseudaelurus intrepidus in a 1869 paper.

In 1873, an expedition collected another lower jaw from the lower Valentine Formation, which was described by Thorpe in 1922 as the holotype of the new species Pseudaelurus marshi. He also described a paratype, a left ramus collected from part of the Ogallala Group (also of Barstovian age).

In 1934, Chester Stock assigned five specimens to Pseudaelurus intrepidus. The specimens, which included the first cranial and upper dental material to be assigned to North American Pseudaelurus, were found at an early Barstovian locality in Nevada. One specimen, a skull, would later undergo considerable plaster restoration.

In 1948, J. R. Macdonald described Pseudaelurus pedionomus based on a considerable amount of material (including a good part of the skeleton) from an early Clarendonian locality in Nebraska. Shortly after, he also described Pseudaelurus thinobates, a larger species from a late Clarendonian locality in California. However, David Kitt removed Pseudaelurus thinobates from the genus, placing it instead as Nimravides thinobates, during a 1958 study. Subsequently, a review of the genus reassigned Pseudaelurus pedionomus to the new genus as Nimravides pedionomus.

J. R. Macdonald described a third species, Pseudaelurus aeluroides, in 1954 based on a single lower jaw fragment. The fragment was found in the lower Snake Creek locality, and was from the early Barstovian. The fragment remained the only specimen assigned to Ps. aeluroides, and an examination of illustration and measurements of the fragment in 2003 lead Tom Rothwell to suggest that it actually belonged to a juvenile Ps. marshi.

In 1963, some early Clarendonian material from Colorado, mostly skeletal pieces and all from a single individual, was referred to genus Pseudaelurus, but a species determination was not made.

In 1969, some material from the Hemphillian of Texas was referred to the new species Pseudaelurus hibbardi. Similar in size to Nimravides pedionomus, this was referred in 2003 to Nimravides hibbardi instead.

In 2001, Tom Rothwell described a skeleton from the later Hemingfordian as Pseudaelurus validus. The skeleton was originally collected in 1939 from the Nambe Member locality in New Mexico. In the same paper, he also assigned a number of specimens collected from multiple localities in Nebraska, dated to the late Hemingfordian and early Barstovian.

A systematic review of the genus in 2003 by Tom Rothwell nominated a new species, Pseudaelurus skinneri, and recombined Lynx stouti as Pseudaelurus stouti. Pseudaelurus skinneri was described based on several jaw fragments collected from various late Hemingfordian localities in Nebraska. Lynx stouti was first described in 1972 based on some late Barstovian material, a partial skull and mandible, collected in Colorado. He also referred a number of other specimens, collected from early Barstovian localities in Nebraska and New Mexico and from late Barstovian localities in New Mexico and Colorado, to Pseudaelurus stouti.

The genus Hyperailurictis was first described in 1929 by Miklós Kretzoi, using Pseudaelurus intrepidus as the type species, proposed to include all Pseudaelurus-grade felids from North America. However, this was largely ignored by later studies until a 2010 review of the Felidae as a whole brought up the proposal again, leading to some authors, though not all, recognizing the generic split.

== Description ==
Hyperailurictis intrepidus was a relatively large species, comparable in size to a modern-day leopard, and overlapping in size with the Eurasian Pseudaelurus quadridentatus. H. marshi was also a large species, but differed from H. intrepidus because of certain mandibular features. H. stouti, which was contemporary with the two, was by contrast a very small and slender felid. H. validus overlaps in size with H. intrepidus and H. marshi, being similar in size to a leopard. The final species, H. skinneri is much smaller than H. validus, overlapping in size with the Eurasian species Pseudaelurus lorteti, P. cuspidatus, and P. guangheensis.

== Distribution and habitat ==
Location of Pseudaelurus grade fossils in North America based on Paleobiology Database., Hyperailurictis.

Hyperailurictis validus and Hyperailurictis skinneri are the earliest recorded species, both occurring in various late Hemingfordian localities; H. validus in New Mexico and Nebraska, and H. skinneri only in Nebraska. H. validus is also known from several early Barstovian localities in Nebraska.

Also known from early Barstovian-aged localities are the species H. intrepidus (localities in Texas, Colorado, Nevada, California, and Nebraska), H marshi (localities in Texas, California, Colorado, and Nebraska) and H. stouti (from localities in Nebraska and New Mexico). The dubious species H. aeluroides is also based on a fossil from the early Barstovian; the fossil in question was found in Nebraska.

In addition, H. intrepidus, H. marshi, and H. stouti are all known from localities of late Barstovian age. H. intrepidus and H. marshi are both known from localities in Nebraska and California, with H. marshi additionally occurring in localities in Colorado and New Mexico. H. stouti has been recorded in localities in Colorado and New Mexico as well.
