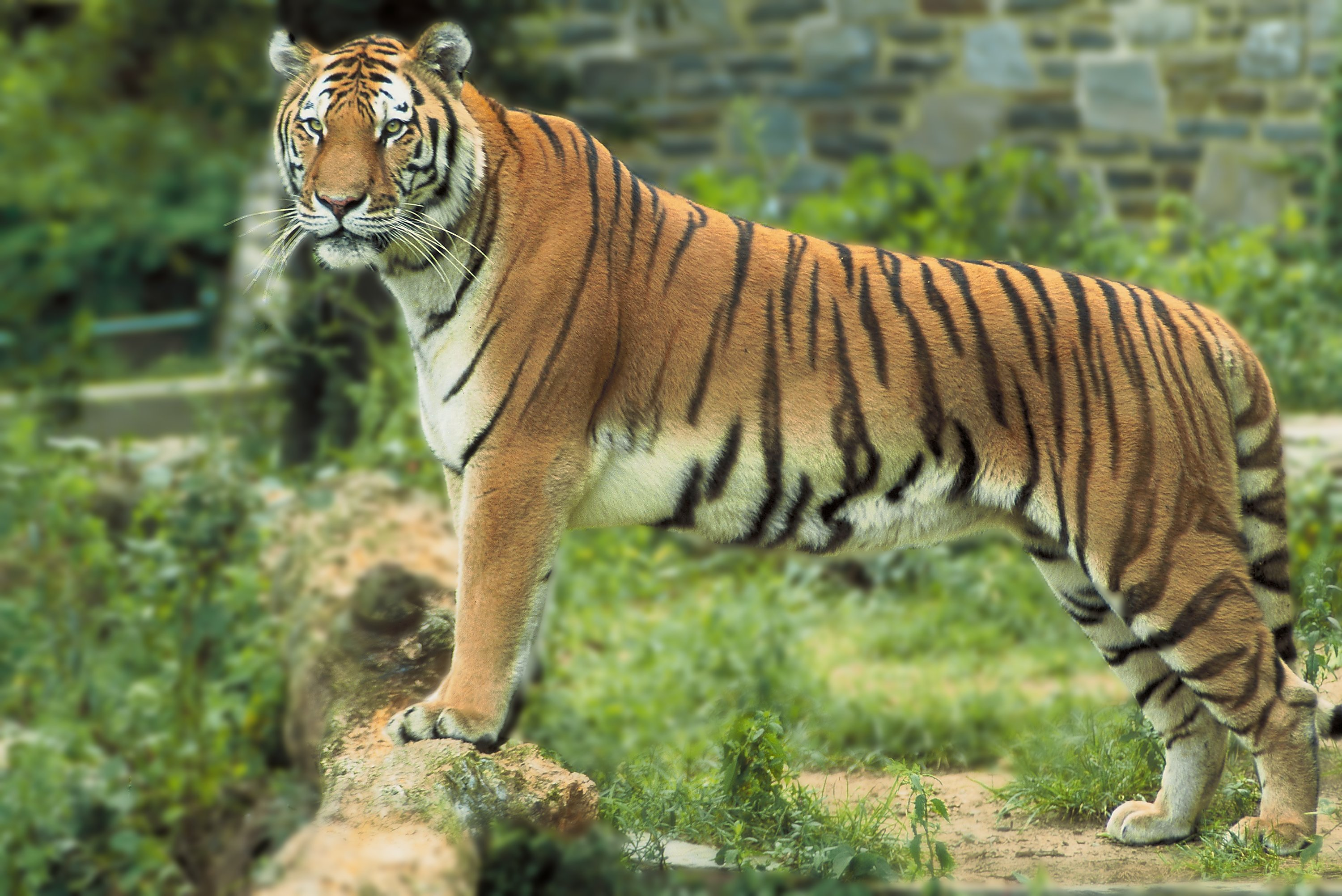
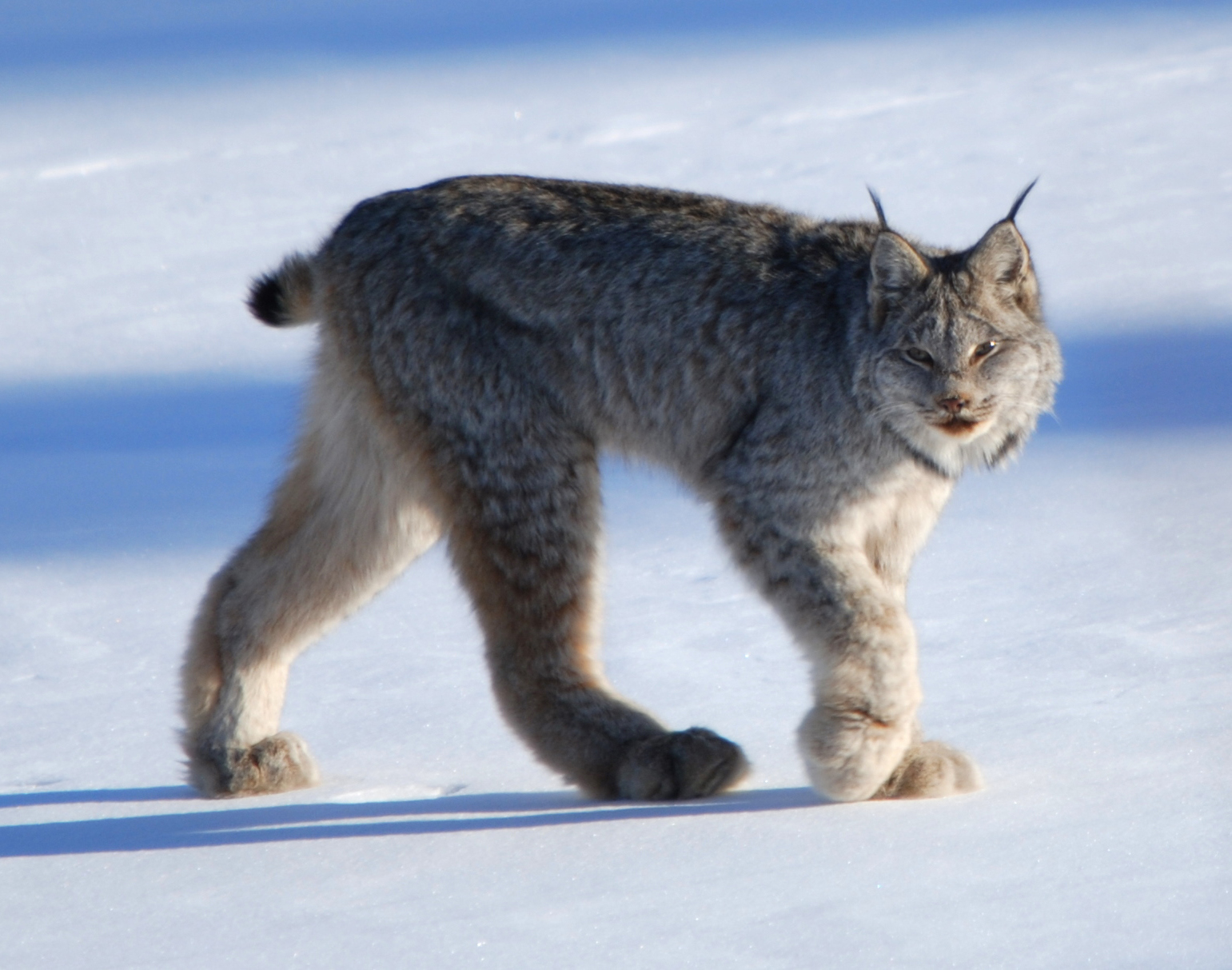
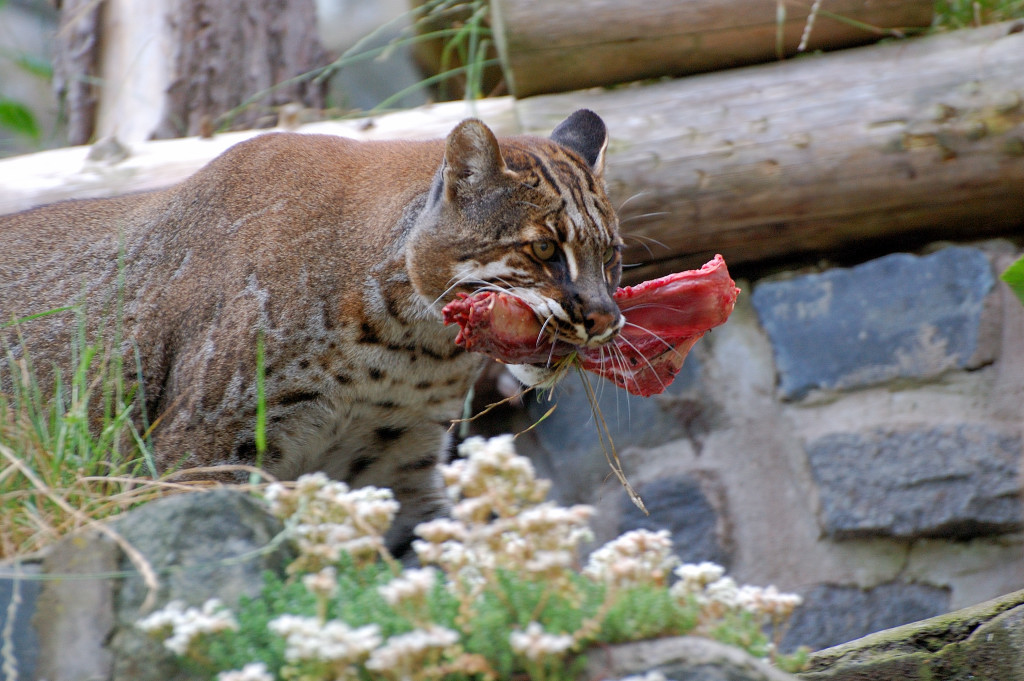
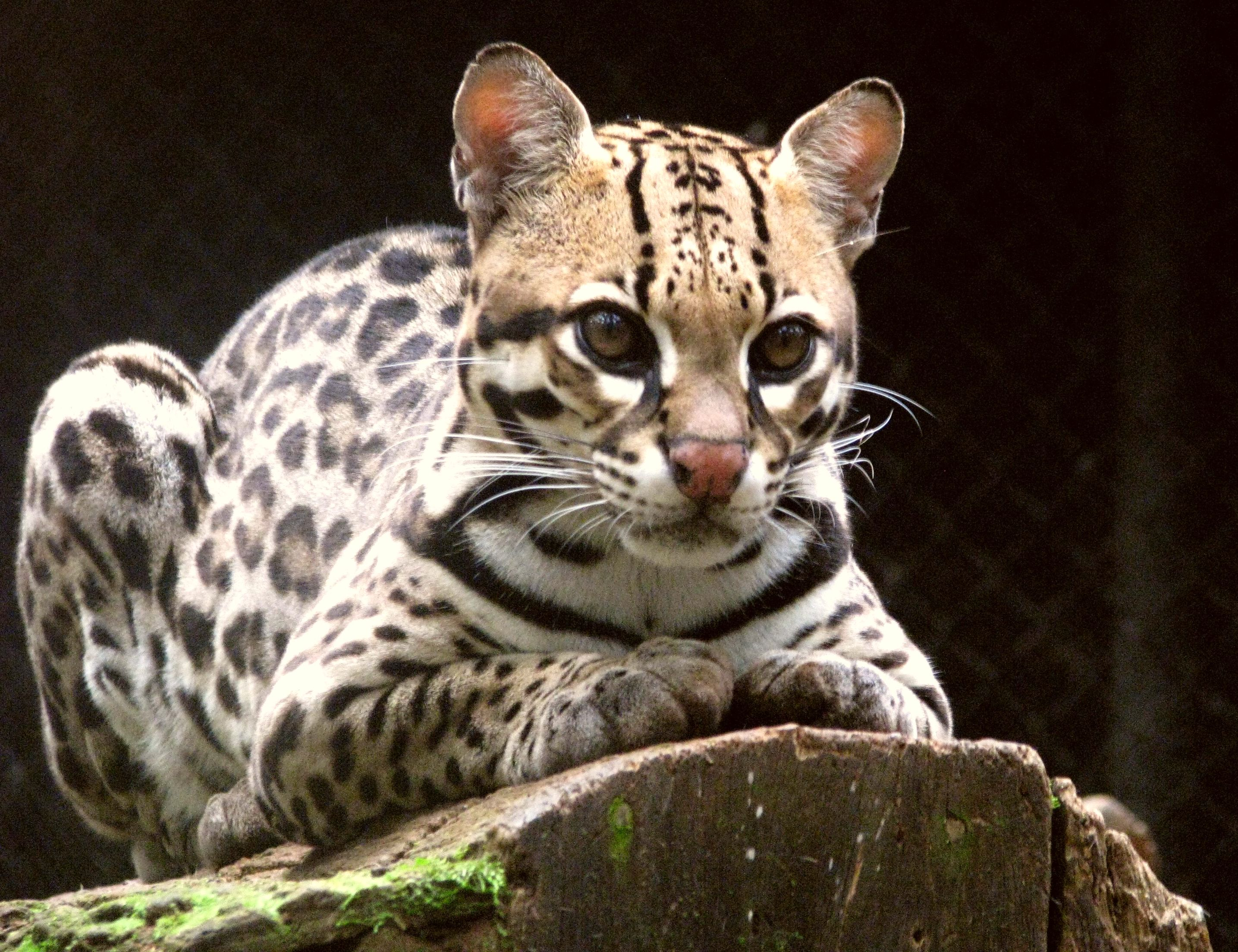
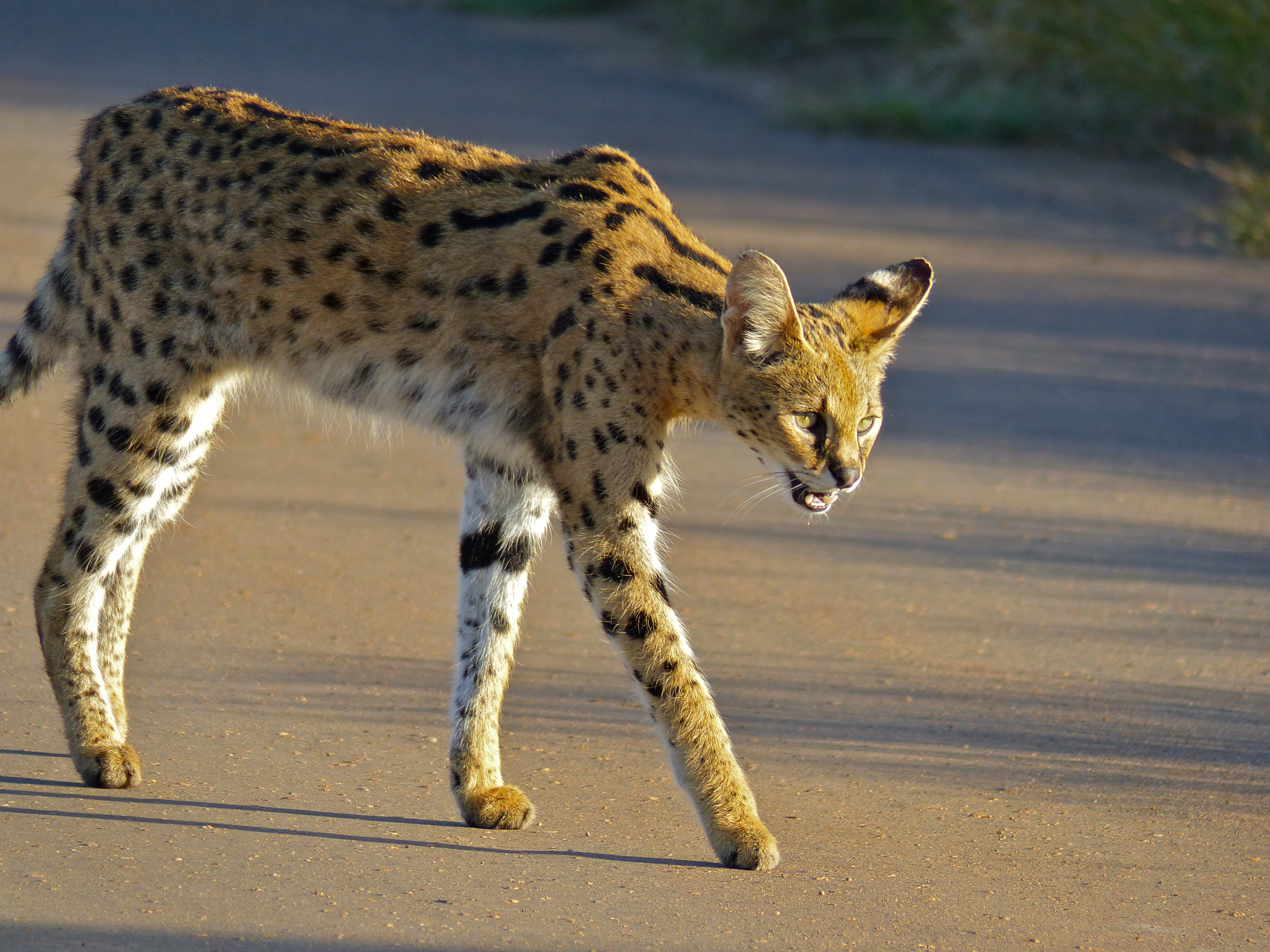
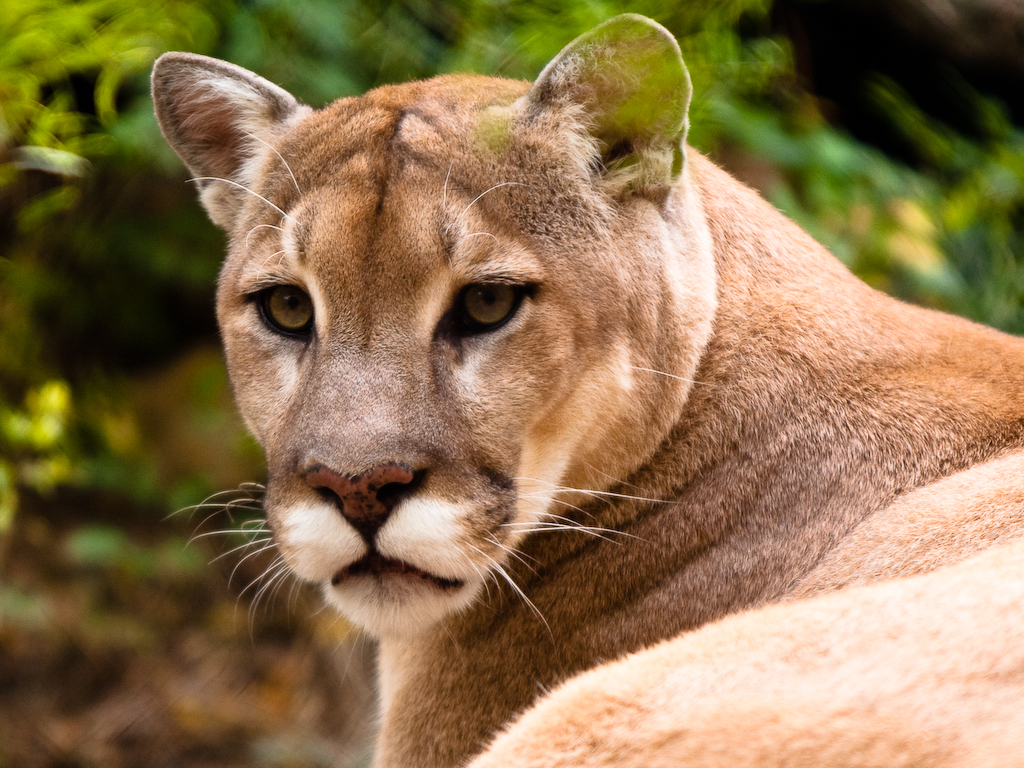
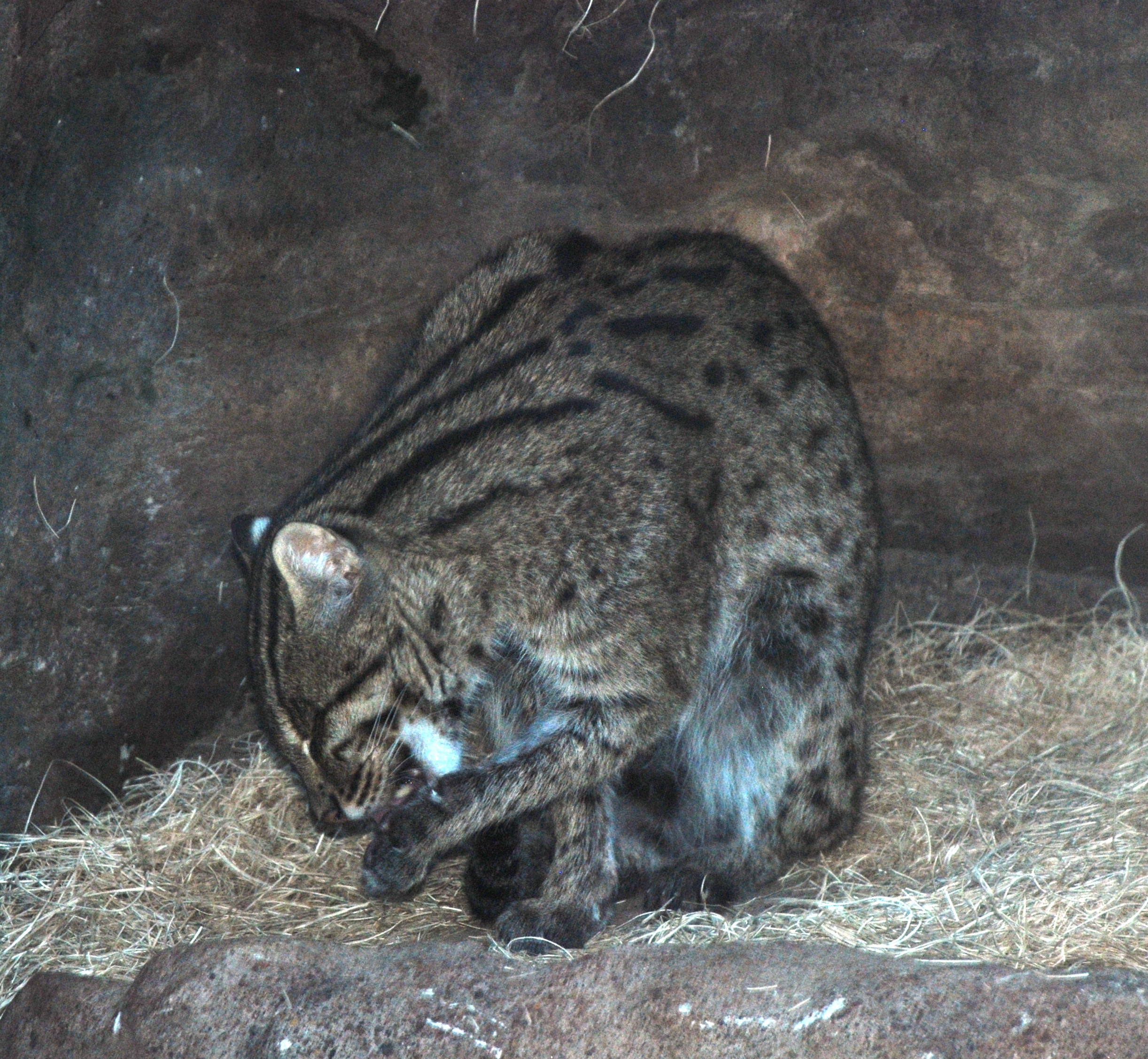
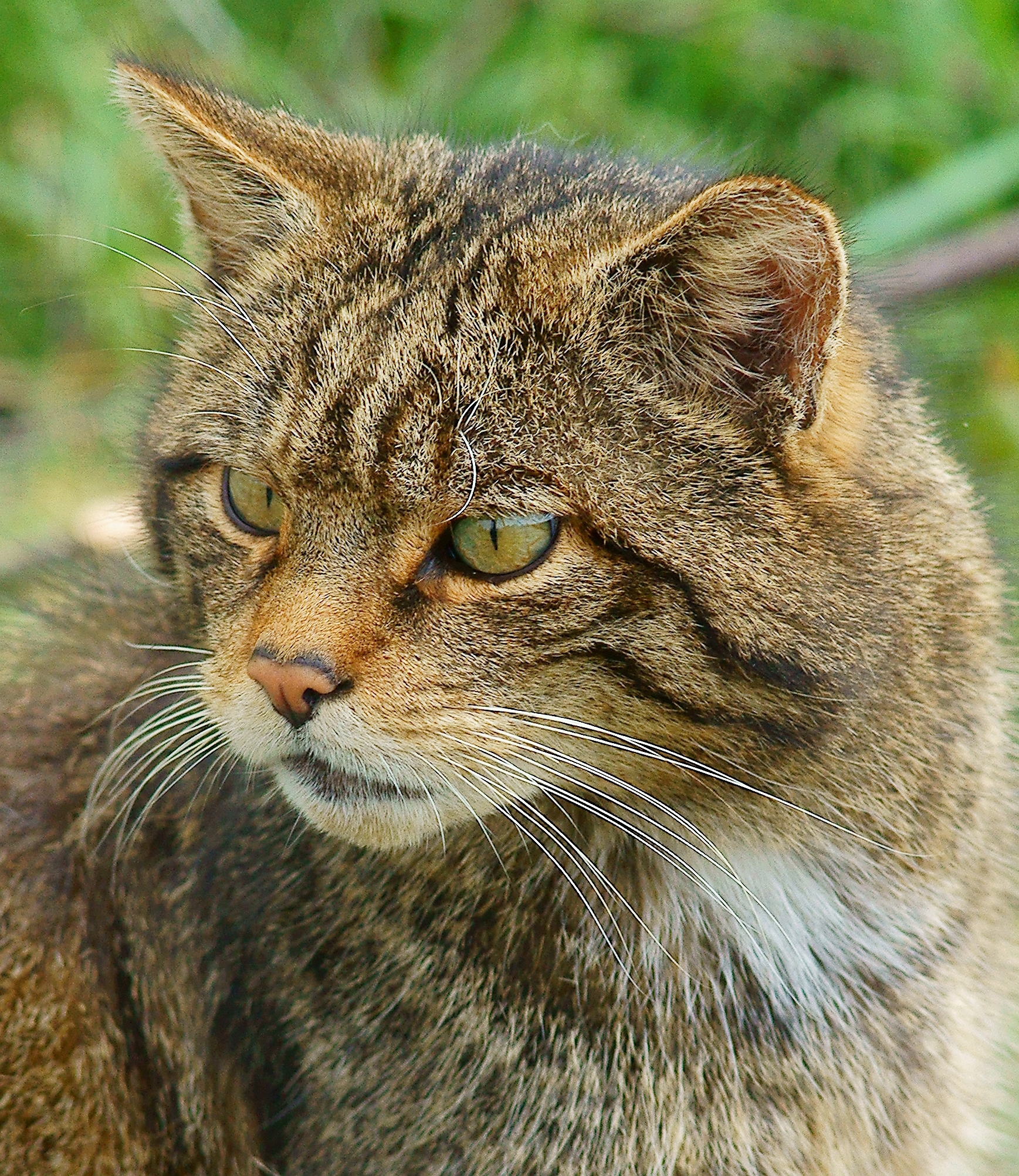
- Tiger Canada lynx Asian golden cat Ocelot Serval Cougar Fishing cat European wildcat

Scientific classification
- Kingdom: Animalia
- Phylum: Chordata
- Class: Mammalia
- Order: Carnivora
- Superfamily: Feloidea
- Family: Felidae; Fischer von Waldheim, 1817

Type genus
- Felis Linnaeus, 1758

Subfamilies and genera
- †Asilifelis; †Diamantofelis; †Hyperailurictis; †Katifelis; †Miopanthera; †Namafelis; †Pseudaelurus; †Sivaelurus; †Styriofelis; †Proailurinae; †Vinayakia?; †Proailurus; †Machairodontinae; Pantherinae; Felinae
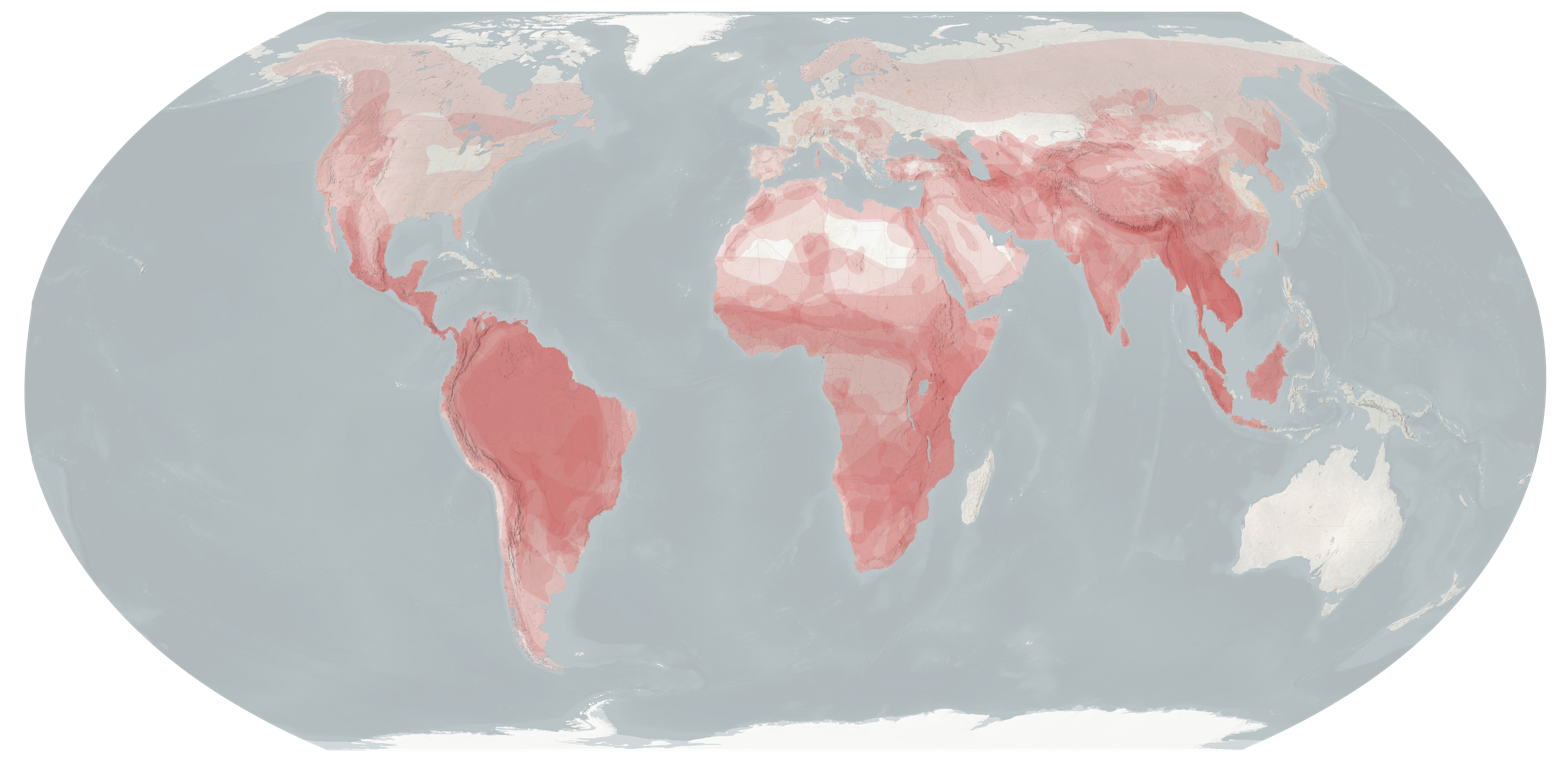
- The native distribution and density of extant felid species.

= Felidae =

Felidae Temporal range: Oligocene–Present, 30.8–0 Ma

Family of mammals

Felidae (/ˈfiːləˌdiː/ FEE-lə-dee) is the family of mammals in the order Carnivora commonly referred to as cats. A member of this family is also called a felid (/ˈfiːlɪd, -ləd/ FEE-lid, -ləd).

The 41 officially recognized extant Felidae species exhibit the greatest diversity in fur patterns of all terrestrial carnivores. Cats have retractile claws, slender muscular bodies and strong flexible forelimbs. Their teeth and facial muscles allow for a powerful bite. They are all obligate carnivores, and most are solitary predators ambushing or stalking their prey. Some wild cat species are adapted to forest and savanna habitats, some to arid environments, and a few also to wetlands and mountainous terrain. Their activity patterns range from nocturnal and crepuscular to diurnal, depending on their preferred prey species.

Reginald Innes Pocock divided the extant Felidae into three subfamilies: the Pantherinae, the Felinae and the Acinonychinae, differing from each other by the ossification of the hyoid apparatus and by the cutaneous sheaths which protect their claws. This concept has been revised following developments in molecular biology and techniques for the analysis of morphological data. Today, the living Felidae are divided into two subfamilies: the Pantherinae and Felinae, with the Acinonychinae subsumed into the latter. Pantherinae includes five Panthera and two Neofelis species, while Felinae includes the other 34 species in 12 genera.

The first cats emerged during the Oligocene about 25 million years ago, with the appearance of Proailurus and Pseudaelurus. The latter species complex was ancestral to two main lines of felids: the cats in the extant subfamilies, and the "saber-toothed cats" of the extinct subfamily Machairodontinae, including the famous saber-toothed tiger.

The "false saber-toothed cats", the Barbourofelidae and Nimravidae, are not true cats, but are closely related. Together with the Felidae, Viverridae, Nandiniidae, Eupleridae, hyenas, and mongooses, they constitute the Feliformia.

== Characteristics ==
Domestic cat purring

Domestic cat meowing

Lion roaring

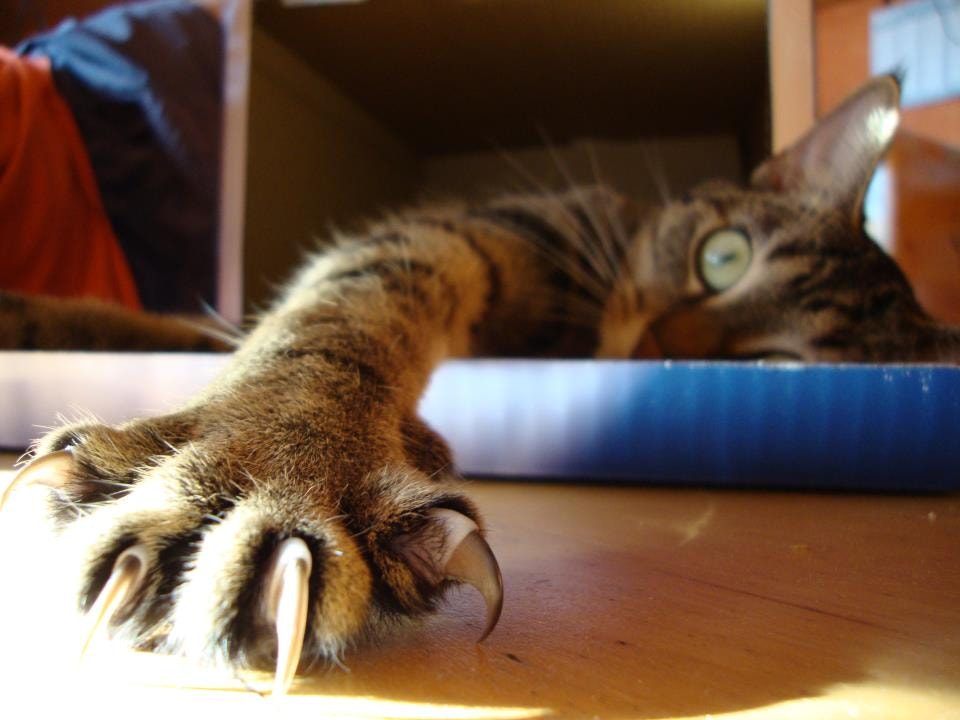
Extended claws of a house cat

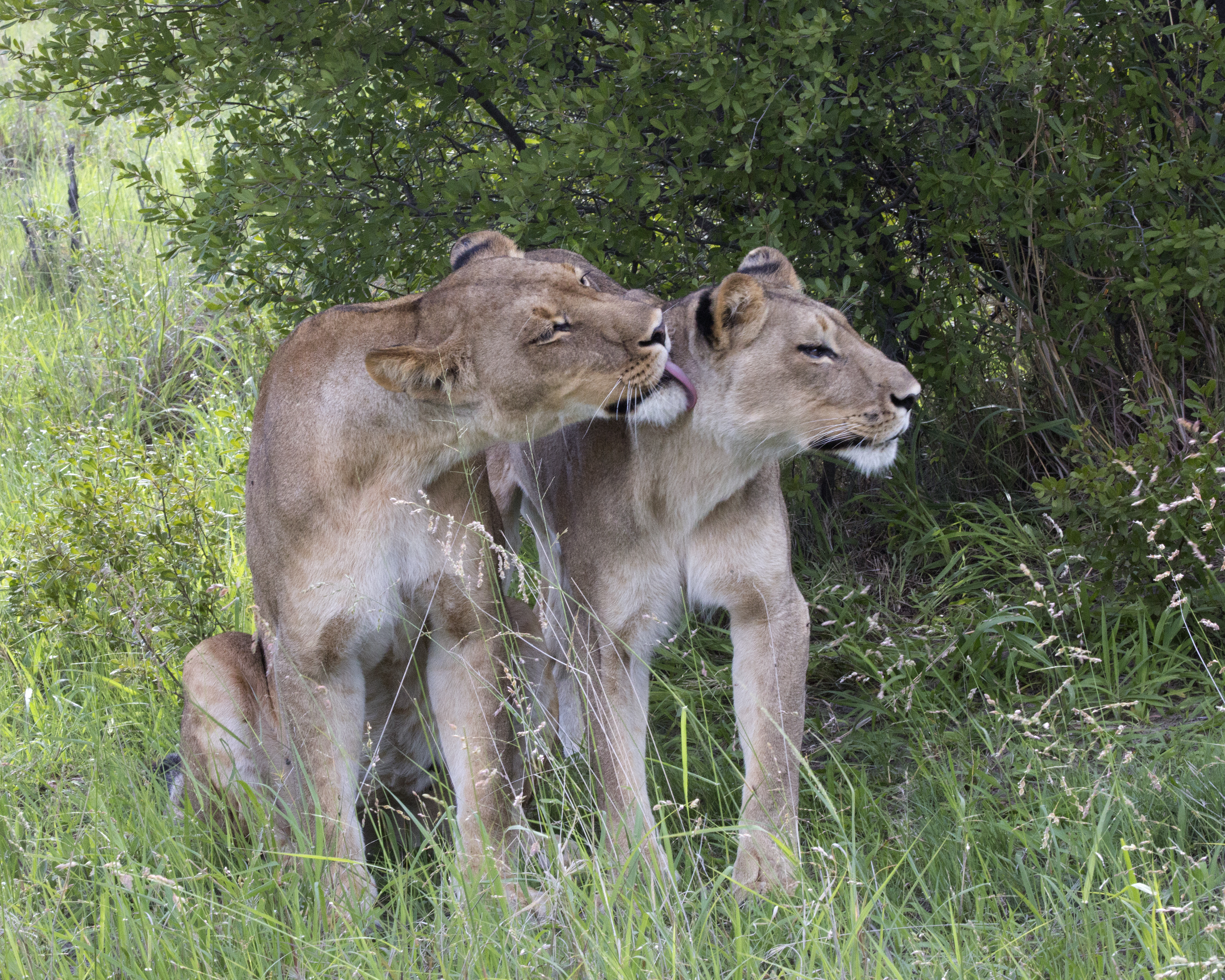
Lionesses grooming each other

All members of the cat family have the following characteristics in common:

- They are digitigrade and have five toes on their forefeet and four on their hind feet. Their curved claws are protractile and attached to the terminal bones of the toe with ligaments and tendons. The claws are guarded by cutaneous sheaths, except in the Acinonyx.
- The plantar pads of both fore and hind feet form compact three-lobed cushions.
- They actively protract the claws by contracting muscles in the toe, and they passively retract them. The dewclaws are expanded but do not protract.
- They have lithe and flexible bodies with muscular limbs.
- Their skulls are foreshortened with a rounded profile and large orbits.
- They have 30 teeth with a dental formula of 3.1.3.13.1.2.1. The upper third premolar and lower molar are adapted as carnassial teeth, suited to tearing and cutting flesh. The canine teeth are large, reaching exceptional size in the extinct Machairodontinae. The lower carnassial is smaller than the upper carnassial and has a crown with two compressed blade-like pointed cusps.
- Their tongues are covered with horn-like papillae, which rasp meat from prey and aid in grooming.
- Their noses project slightly beyond the lower jaw.
- Their eyes are relatively large, situated to provide binocular vision. Their night vision is especially good due to the presence of a tapetum lucidum, which reflects light inside the eyeball, and gives felid eyes their distinctive shine. As a result, the eyes of felids are about six times more light-sensitive than those of humans, and many species are at least partially nocturnal. The retina of felids also contains a relatively high proportion of rod cells, adapted for distinguishing moving objects in conditions of dim light, which are complemented by the presence of cone cells for sensing colour during the day.
- They have well-developed and highly sensitive whiskers above the eyes, on the cheeks, and the muzzle, but not below the chin. Whiskers help to navigate in the dark and to capture and hold prey.
- Their external ears are large and especially sensitive to high-frequency sounds in the smaller cat species. This sensitivity allows them to locate small rodent prey.
- The penis is subconical, facing downward when not erect and backward during urination. The baculum is small or vestigial, and shorter than in the Canidae. Most felids have penile spines that induce ovulation during copulation.
- They have a vomeronasal organ in the roof of the mouth, allowing them to "taste" the air. The use of this organ is associated with the flehmen response.
- They cannot detect the sweetness of sugar, as they lack the sweet taste receptor.
- They share a broadly similar set of vocalizations but with some variation between species. In particular, the pitch of calls varies, with larger species producing deeper sounds; overall, the frequency of felid calls ranges between 50 and 10,000 hertz. The standard sounds made by felids include mewing, chuffing, spitting, hissing, snarling and growling. Mewing and chuffing are the main contact sound, whereas the others signify an aggressive motivation.
- They can purr during both phases of respiration, though pantherine cats seem to purr only during oestrus and copulation, and as cubs when suckling. Purring is generally a low-pitch sound of 16.8–27.5 Hz and is mixed with other vocalization types during the expiratory phase. The ability to roar comes from an elongated and specially adapted larynx and hyoid apparatus. When air passes through the larynx on the way from the lungs, the cartilage walls of the larynx vibrate, producing sound. Only lions, leopards, tigers, and jaguars are truly able to roar, although the loudest mews of snow leopards have a similar, if less structured, sound. Clouded leopards can neither purr nor roar, and so Neofelis is said to be a sister group to Panthera. Sabre-toothed cats may have had the ability to both roar and purr.

The colour, length and density of their fur are very diverse. Fur colour covers the gamut from white to black, and fur patterns from distinctive small spots, and stripes to small blotches and rosettes. Most cat species are born with spotted fur, except the jaguarundi (Herpailurus yagouaroundi), Asian golden cat (Catopuma temminckii) and caracal (Caracal caracal). The spotted fur of lion (Panthera leo) and cougar (Puma concolor) cubs change to uniform fur during their development to adulthood. Those living in cold environments have thick fur with long hair, like the snow leopard (Panthera uncia) and the Pallas's cat (Otocolobus manul). Those living in tropical and hot climate zones have short fur. Several species exhibit melanism with all-black individuals, cougars are notable for lacking melanism but leucism and albinism are present in cougars along with many other felids.

In the great majority of cat species, the tail is between a third and a half of the body length, although with some exceptions, like the Lynx species and margay (Leopardus wiedii). Cat species vary greatly in body and skull sizes, and weights:

- The largest cat species is the tiger (Panthera tigris), with a head-to-body length of up to 390 cm (150 in), a weight range of at least 65 to 325 kg (143 to 717 lb), and a skull length ranging from 316 to 413 mm (12.4 to 16.3 in). Although the maximum skull length of a lion is slightly greater at 419 mm (16.5 in), it is generally smaller in head-to-body length than the tiger.
- The smallest cat species are the rusty-spotted cat (Prionailurus rubiginosus) and the black-footed cat (Felis nigripes). The former is 35–48 cm (14–19 in) in length and weighs 0.9–1.6 kg (2.0–3.5 lb). The latter has a head-to-body length of 36.7–43.3 cm (14.4–17.0 in) and a maximum recorded weight of 2.45 kg (5.4 lb).

Most cat species have a haploid number of 18 or 19. Central and South American cats have a haploid number of 18, possibly due to the combination of two smaller chromosomes into a larger one.

Felidae species have type IIx muscle fibers three times more powerful than the muscle fibers of human athletes.

== Evolutionary history ==
Feliform evolutionary timeline

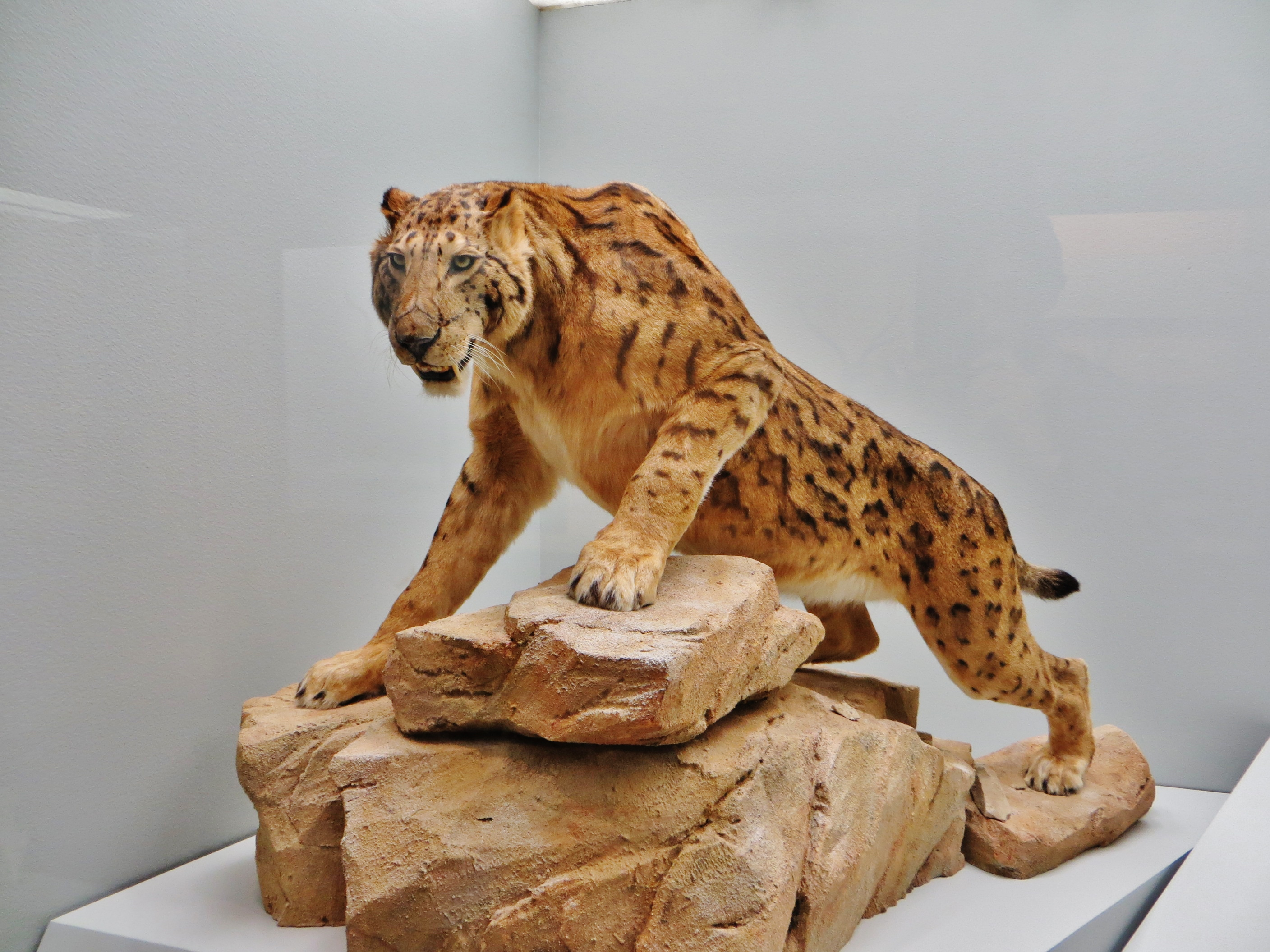
Megantereon model at Natural History Museum of Basel

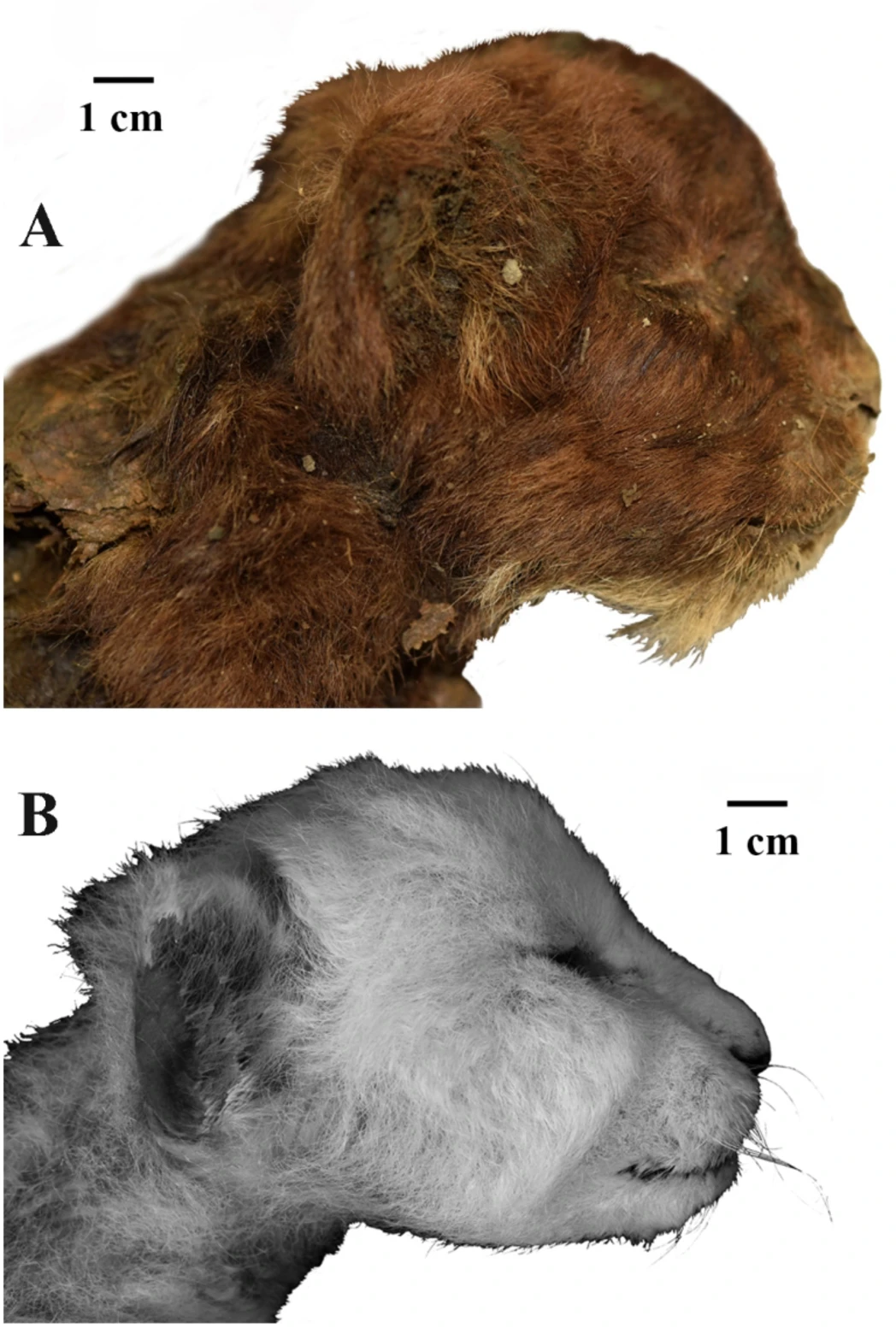
External appearance of three-week-old heads of large felid cubs, right lateral view:

(A) Homotherium latidens (Owen, 1846), specimen DMF AS RS, no. Met-20-1, frozen mummy, Russia, Republic of Sakha (Yakutia), Indigirka River basin, Badyarikha River; Upper Pleistocene;

(B) Panthera leo (Linnaeus, 1758), specimen ZMMU, no. S-210286; Recent.

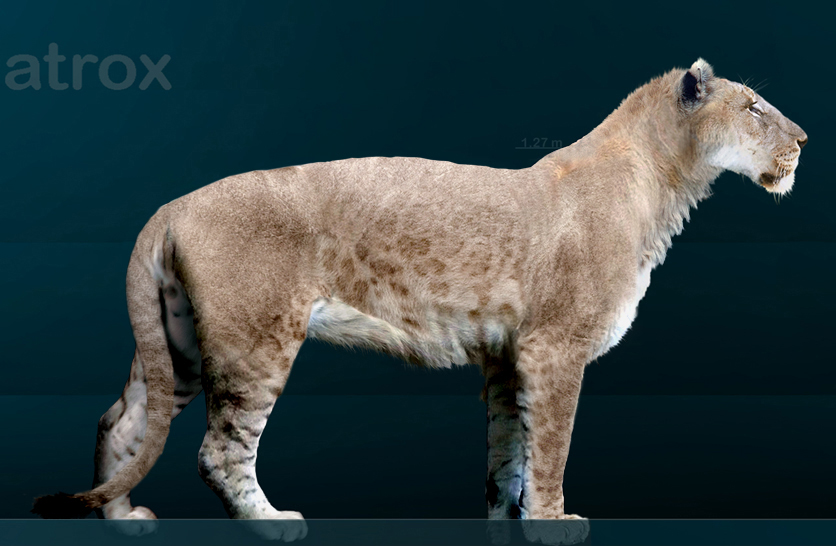
Graphical reconstruction of an American lion (Panthera atrox)

The family Felidae is part of the Feliformia, a suborder that diverged probably about 50.6 to 35 million years ago into several families. The Felidae and the Asiatic linsangs are considered a sister group, which split about 35.2 to 31.9 million years ago.

The earliest cats probably appeared about 35 to 28.5 million years ago. Proailurus is the oldest known cat that occurred after the Eocene–Oligocene extinction event about 33.9 million years ago; fossil remains were excavated in France and Mongolia's Hsanda Gol Formation. Fossil occurrences indicate that the Felidae arrived in North America around 18.5 million years ago. This is about 20 million years later than the bears and the false saber-tooth cats, and about 10 million years later than the canines.

In the Early Miocene about 20 to 16.6 million years ago, Pseudaelurus lived in Africa. Its fossil jaws were also excavated in geological formations of Europe's Vallesian, Asia's Middle Miocene and North America's late Hemingfordian to late Barstovian epochs. Modelling of felid coat pattern transformations revealed that nearly all patterns evolved from small spots.

During the Middle Miocene around 15 million years ago, the extinct subfamily Machairodontinae (colloquially known as "saber-toothed cats") emerged and became widespread across Afro-Eurasia and North America by the Late Miocene. With their large upper canine saber teeth, they were adapted to prey on large-bodied megaherbivores. During the Late Miocene and early Pliocene, machairodontines were the dominant cats and large mammalian predators across Afro-Eurasia and North America, with ancestors of living cats generally being small at this time.

The earliest members of the living cat lineages are known from the Middle Miocene, with the last common ancestor of living cats estimated to have lived around 16 million years ago. Large sized felines and pantherines only emerged during the Pliocene epoch, including the modern big cat genus Panthera. Felids entered South America as part of the Great American Interchange following the emergence of the Isthmus of Panama during the Pliocene epoch.

Machairodontines began to decline during the Pleistocene, perhaps as a result of environmental change and consequential changes in prey abundance, competition with large living cat lineages such as the pantherins as well as possibly archaic humans. The last species belonging to the genera Smilodon and Homotherium became extinct along with many other large mammals around 12–10,000 years ago as part of the end-Pleistocene extinction event, following human arrival to the Americas at the end of the Late Pleistocene.

== Classification ==
Traditionally, five subfamilies had been distinguished within the Felidae based on phenotypical features: the Pantherinae, the Felinae, the Acinonychinae, and the extinct Machairodontinae and Proailurinae. Acinonychinae used to only contain the genus Acinonyx but this genus is now within the Felinae subfamily.

In modern classifications of extant felids, Pantherinae and Felinae are treated as distinct sister subfamilies, with Felinae restricted in the strict sense (sensu stricto) to the small cats. In palaeontological literature, however, the term Felinae (sensu lato) is frequently used to encompass all conical-toothed cats, contrasting them with the extinct saber-toothed cats (Machairodontinae). Under this broader definition, the clade includes Felinae (sensu stricto), Pantherinae, and basal fossil genera such as †Miopanthera.

=== Phylogeny ===
The following cladogram based on Piras et al. (2013) depicts the phylogeny of basal living and extinct groups.

- Felidae
  - †Proailurus
    Proailurinae
    - †Proailurus bourbonnensis
    - †Proailurus lemanensis
    - †Proailurus major
  - "Pseudaelurus" (grade)
    - Pseudaelurus lineage
      - †Pseudaelurus
        - †Pseudaelurus quadridentatus
        - †Pseudaelurus cuspidatus
        - †Pseudaelurus guangheesis
      - †Machairodontinae
    - †Hyperailurictis
      Hyperailurictis lineage
      - †Hyperailurictis intrepidus
      - †Hyperailurictis marshi
      - †Hyperailurictis stouti
      - †Hyperailurictis validus
      - †Hyperailurictis skinneri
    - †Sivaelurus
      †Sivaelurus chinjiensis
    - Styriofelis lineage
      - †Styriofelis
        - †Styriofelis turnauensis
        - †Styriofelis romieviensis
      - Felinae sensu lato
        - Felinae
        - - †Miopanthera
            - †Miopanthera lorteti
            - †Miopanthera pamiri
          - Pantherinae

The phylogenetic relationships of living felids are shown in the following cladogram:

- Felidae
  Panthera lineage
  - Pantherinae
    - Neofelis
      - Sunda clouded leopard (N. diardi)
      - Clouded leopard (N. nebulosa)
    - Panthera
      - - Tiger (P. tigris)
        - Snow leopard (P. uncia)
      - - Jaguar (P. onca)
        - - Lion (P. leo)
          - Leopard (P. pardus)
  - Felinae
    Caracal lineage
    - - Leptailurus
        Serval (L. serval)
      - Caracal
        - African golden cat (C. aurata)
        - Caracal (C. caracal)
    - Ocelot lineage
      - Leopardus
        - - Andean mountain cat (L. jacobita)
          - - Ocelot (L. pardalis)
            - Margay (L. wiedii)
        - - - Pampas cat (L. colocola)
          - - Oncilla (Northern tiger cat, L. tigrina)
            - - Southern tiger cat (L. guttulus)
              - - Geoffroy's cat (L. geoffroyi)
                - Kodkod (L. guigna)
      - - Bay cat lineage
          - - Pardofelis
              Marbled cat (P. marmorata)
            - Catopuma
              - Bay cat (C. badia)
              - Asian golden cat (C. temminckii)
          - - Lynx
              Lynx lineage
              - Bobcat (L. rufus)
              - - Canada lynx (L. canadensis)
                - - Eurasian lynx (L. lynx)
                  - Iberian lynx (L. pardinus)
        - Puma lineage
          - - Acinonyx
              Cheetah (A. jubatus)
            - - Herpailurus
                Jaguarundi (H. yagouaroundi)
              - Puma
                Cougar (P. concolor)
          - Leopard cat lineage
            - - Otocolobus
                Pallas's cat (O. manul)
              - Prionailurus
                - Rusty-spotted cat (P. rubiginosus)
                - - Flat-headed cat (P. planiceps)
                  - - Fishing cat (P. viverrinus)
                    - - Leopard cat (P. bengalensis)
                      - Sunda leopard cat (P. javanensis)
            - Felis
              Domestic cat lineage
              - Jungle cat (F. chaus)
              - - Black-footed cat (F. nigripes)
                - - Sand cat (F. margarita)
                  - wildcats
                    - - Chinese mountain cat (F. bieti)
                      - African wildcat (F. lybica)
                    - - Domestic cat (F. catus)
                      - European wildcat (F. silvestris)

== See also ==
- Cat gap
- Felid hybrid
- List of felids
- List of largest cats
