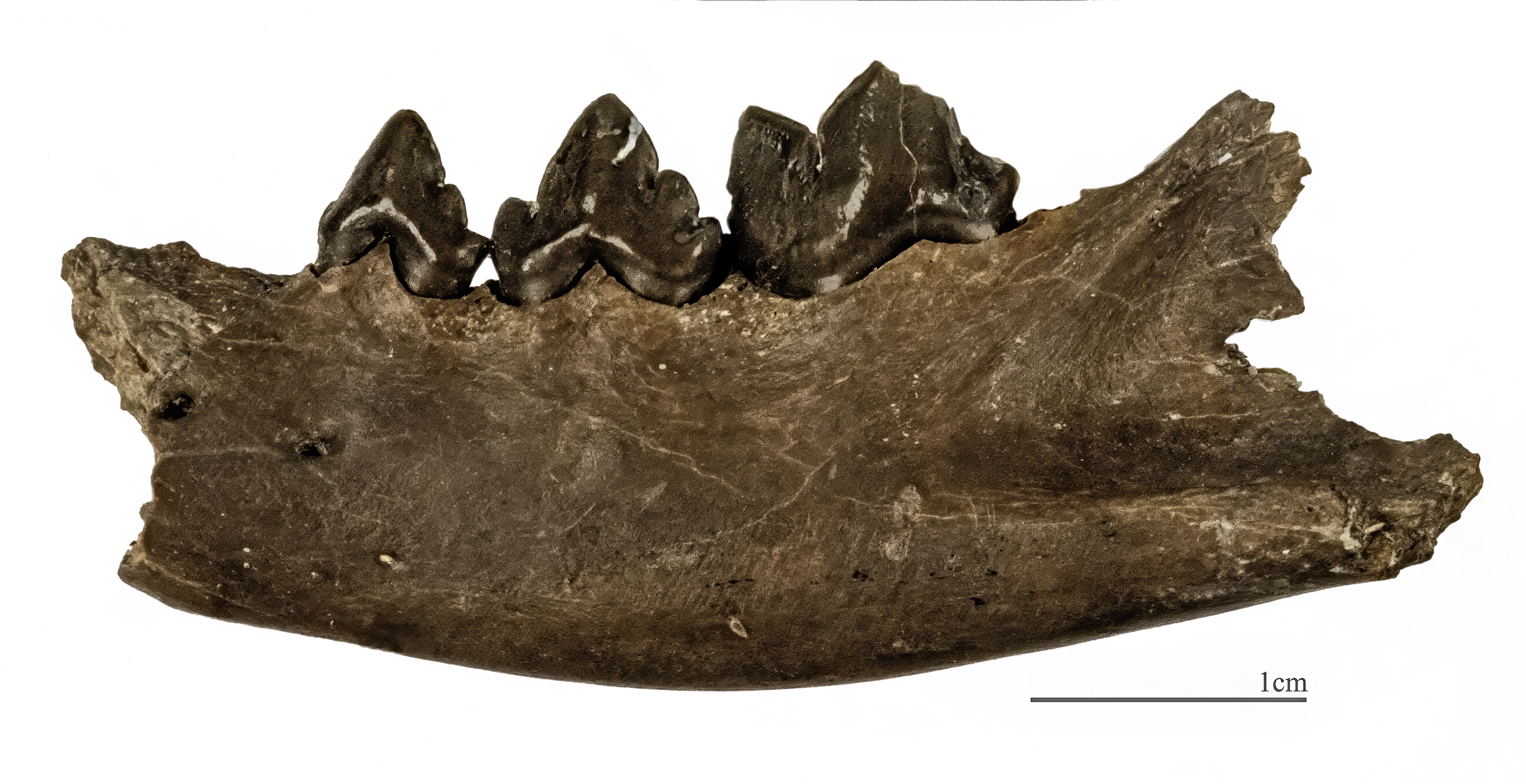

Scientific classification
- Kingdom: Animalia
- Phylum: Chordata
- Class: Mammalia
- Order: Carnivora
- Family: Felidae
- Genus: †Miopanthera; Kretzoi, 1938

Type species
- †Pseudaelurus lorteti Gaillard, 1899

Species
- †M. lorteti (Gaillard, 1899); †M. pamiri? (Ozansoy, 1965)

Synonyms
- M. lorteti: Pseudaelurus lorteti; Styriofelis lorteti; Schizailurus lorteti; M. pamiri?: Felis pamiri?; Metailurus pamiri?; Palaeopanthera pamiri?

= Miopanthera =

Extinct genus of carnivores

Miopanthera is an extinct genus of Pseudaelurus-grade felids.

== Taxonomy ==
The genus Miopanthera was first proposed in 1938 by Kretzoi for the species Pseudaelurus lorteti. P. lorteti had previously been described as such in 1899, upon the discovery of fossils in Europe. However, Kretzoi's proposal was largely ignored by later authors. A 2010 review of the Felidae proposed splitting the genus Pseudaelurus in three, and suggested assigning P. lorteti to the genus Styriofelis alongside P. turnauensis.

Another species, Felis pamiri, was described in 1965 based on a snout fragment found in Turkey. The locality at which it was found was estimated to be from the late Miocene, about 9.9 Ma. After its original description, no further material was assigned to the species.

In 2017, a review of the species Felis pamiri concluded that it was likely closely related to S. lorteti, and reassigned both species to the genus Miopanthera. The paper also noted that the species Panthera blytheae, which had been described not long before, lacked features that assigned it specifically to the genus Panthera, but that further examination of the material had the potential to clarify Miopanthera's relation to the modern pantherine (Panthera and Neofelis) cats.

A 2020 study of newfound material from the Siwaliks region suggested that the species Miopanthera lorteti be reassigned to the genus Sivaelurus, and that M. pamiri be assigned to a new genus because it is younger, larger, and more derived. Another study done in 2023 proposed moving both M. pamiri and P. blytheae to a new genus, Palaeopanthera. In the same year, the describers of Magerifelis in their study considered Miopanthera lorteti the valid placement.

Other researchers in a 2025 paper agreed that Sivaelurus lorteti is the correct placement, but did not take a stance on the placement of M. pamiri. They also described a fossil, identified as an indeterminate basal feline, which they speculated may represent a species closely related to Sivaelurus. The fossil in question (NPR-1) is a fragmentary right mandible with the fourth premolar and first molar attached, from the lower Dhok Pathan Formation near Haritalyangar, India, and thus about 10 million years of age.

== Description ==
Miopanthera lorteti ranged in size from that of a large caracal to a small leopard. Miopanthera pamiri, which is known only from fragmentary, though intact, material from a single individual, is theorized to have been similar in size to a large lynx or a small puma.

== Evolution ==
M. pamiri is believed to have evolved from the earlier M. lorteti. Due to certain features, it is also considered likely that Miopanthera was in some way ancestral to the modern Panthera lineage.
