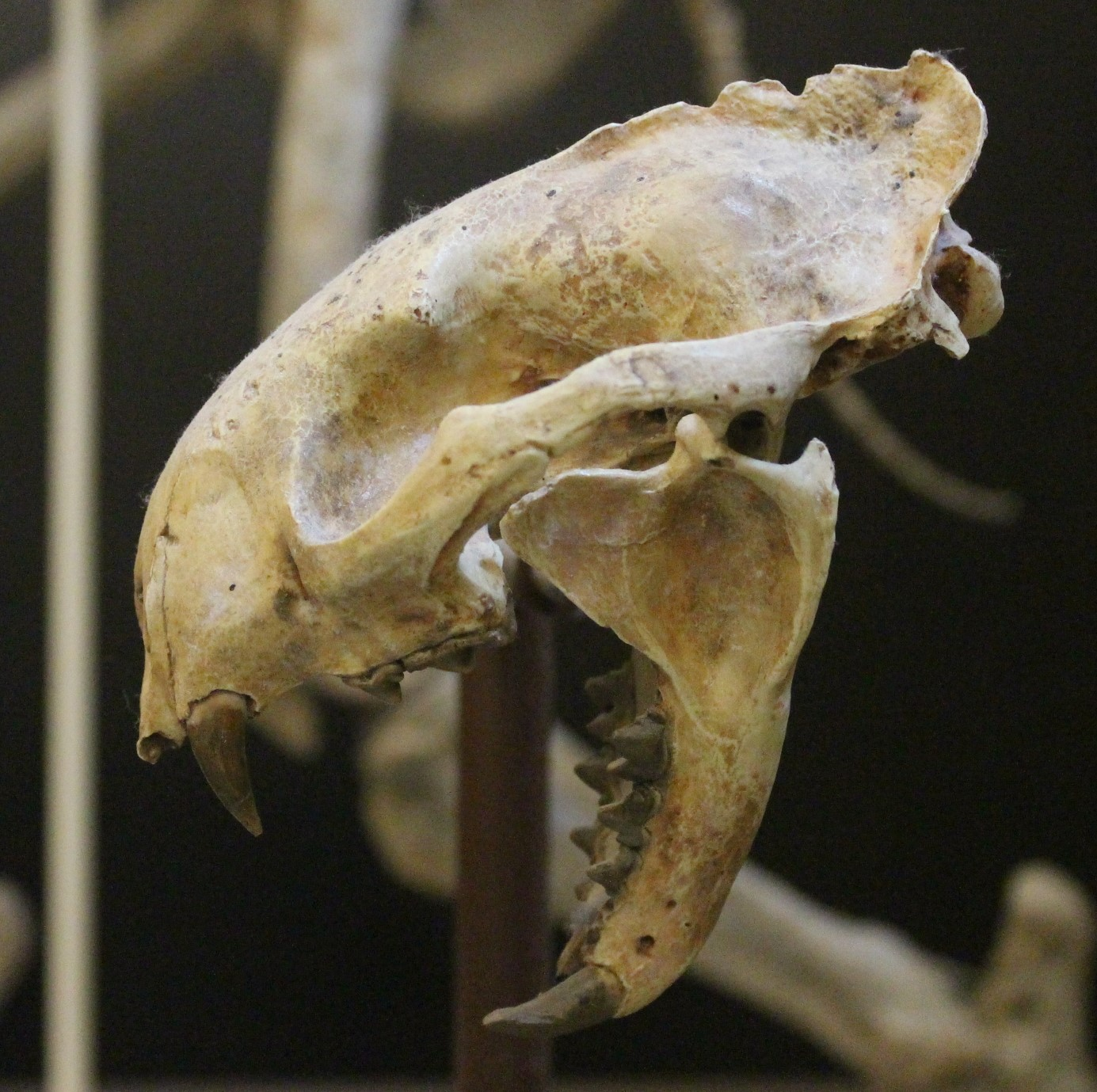
- Proailurus lemanensis skull

Scientific classification
- Kingdom: Animalia
- Phylum: Chordata
- Class: Mammalia
- Order: Carnivora
- Family: Felidae
- Subfamily: †Proailurinae; Zittel, 1893
- Genus: †Proailurus; Filhol, 1879

Type species
- †Proailurus lemanensis Filhol, 1879

Other Species
- †Proailurus bourbonnensis Peigne, 1999; †Proailurus major Peigne, 1999

= Proailurus =

Proailurus Temporal range: Late Oligocene–Early Miocene

Extinct genus of carnivores

Proailurus is an extinct felid genus that lived in Europe and Asia approximately 25–30.8 million years ago in the Late Oligocene and Miocene. Fossils have been found in Mongolia, Germany, and Spain.

== Etymology ==
The generic name Proailurus comes from the Greek πρό pro, meaning 'before', and αἴλουρος ailuros, meaning 'cat'. The specific name of P. bourbonnensis simply means "from the Bourbonnais".

== Description ==
Proailurus lemanensis was a compact and small animal, just a little larger than the domestic cat, weighing about 20 lb (9 kg). It had a long tail, large eyes and sharp claws and teeth, with similar proportions to the modern viverrids. Its claws would have been retractable to some extent. Like the viverrids, Proailurus was at least partially arboreal.

Proailurus major is estimated to have been significantly larger, about 23 kg. The p4 tooth is stronger and the m1 is less elongated than in P. lemanensis.

Proailurus bourbonnensis was a smaller species, estimated to have been 7–10 kg. Of the teeth, the p1 is wholly missing, and the m1 was slightly less elongated and the m2 less reduced than in P. lemanensis.

== Classification ==
The genus Proailurus was first described by Henri Filhol in 1879 for fossils found in the Saint-Gerand site in France. He named two species, Proailurus lemanensis, based on a mandible, and Proailurus julieni. However, P. julieni was later placed in the genus Stenogale.

In 1882, Filhol described a third species, Proailurus medius. In 1888, Schlosser made "P." medius the type species of the genus Haplogale. Haplogale media's placement was later confirmed by Robert Hunt's 1998 studies of aeluroid skulls.

In 1999, Peigné carried out a systematic review of the genus, naming another two species, P. bourbonnensis and P. major, in the process. P. major was based on a single specimen, a left mandible from Quercy and Mainz, while P. bourbonnensis was based on a number of lower mandibles and teeth, as well as a left maxilla.

== Distribution and species ==
Fossils of Proailurus lemanensis were first found in Saint-Gerand and later in Quercy. Robert Hunt, while measuring fragmentary fossils from Hasanda-Gol in Mongolia, placed a lower jaw fragment as Proailurus sp., but Peigne placed the fragment in nimravid genus Eofelis instead, which later authors supported, although at least one suggested the fragment could be assigned to Pseudaelurus cuspidatus instead.

P. major and P. bourbonnensis are both known from a single locality each: P. major from Saint-Gérand-le-Puy and P. bourbonnensis from Saint-Gérand-le-Puy, Weisbaden-Amoneburg, and Budenheim (where it is the only Proailurus species known from the Mainz Basin).

Location of Proailurus fossil finds based on Paleobiology Database. Red, Proailurus lemanensis; orange, Proailurus sp.; yellow, Proailurus-like felid (Hunt, 1998).

Several fossils believed to be Proailurus-grade material have been found in North America, including the Ginn Quarry cat, known from a complete skull, which has dentition similar to Proailurus lemanensis but with a slightly larger skull. Robert Hunt also noted several specimens that he believed belonged to Proailurus-grade felids, including a pair from the Sheep Creek site in Nebraska, one a lynx-sized felid, the other closer in size to a leopard; another individual from an East Cuyumungue locality, possibly the same species as the larger Sheep Creek specimen; and another specimen from Echo Quarry. However, the larger Sheep Creek specimen, the East Cuyumungue individual, and the Echo Quarry specimen were all described and assigned to the species Hyperailurictis validus in 2001, and the smaller Sheep Creek material to Pseudaelurus skinneri in 2003. The Ginn Quarry cat was described, but not assigned to any taxa, in 2019; though the authors did state that "it should not be dismissed as a 'proailurine-grade' felid" and suggested placing it in Hyperailurictis (despite being considerably older than any known Hyperailurictis) or a new genus.

== Evolution ==
Proailurus is believed to have evolved from earlier ailuroid carnivorans such as Stenogale and Haplogale. It is a likely ancestor of Pseudaelurus, which lived 20–10 million years ago, and probably gave rise to the major felid lines, including the extinct machairodontines and the extant felines and pantherines, although the phylogeny of the cats is still not precisely known.

Proailurus is largely considered to be the first "true" cat and the ancestor of the entire cat family. Most studies support this, placing Proailurus as the basal member of the Felidae. One 2005 phylogeny placed it as a basal member of the Feliformia, but later studies do not support this.
