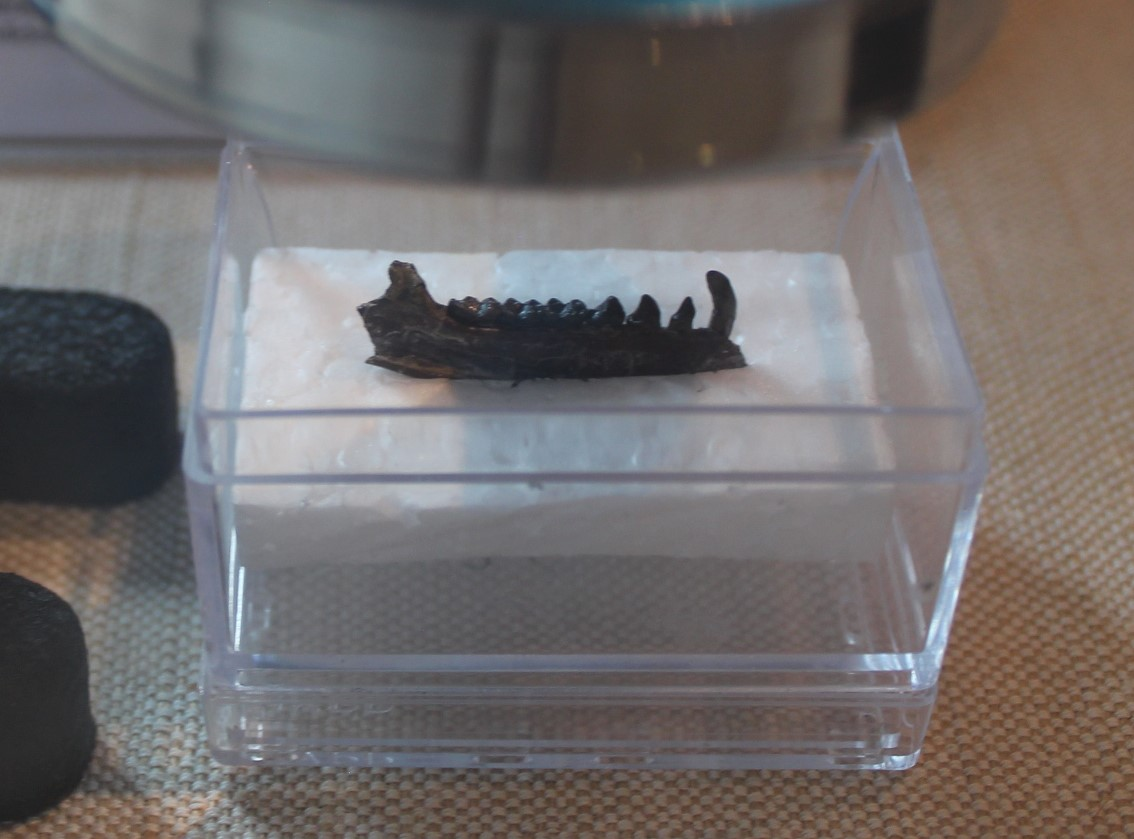
- Paratype lower jaw (IVPP V10220), Paleozoological Museum of China

Scientific classification
- Kingdom: Animalia
- Phylum: Chordata
- Class: Mammalia
- Order: Primates
- Suborder: Strepsirrhini
- Family: †Sivaladapidae
- Genus: †Hoanghonius; Zdansky, 1930
- Species: †H. stehlini

Binomial name
- †Hoanghonius stehlini Zdansky, 1930

= Hoanghonius =

Hoanghonius Temporal range: Middle Eocene

Extinct genus of primates

Hoanghonius is a genus of adapiform primate that lived in Asia during the middle Eocene.
