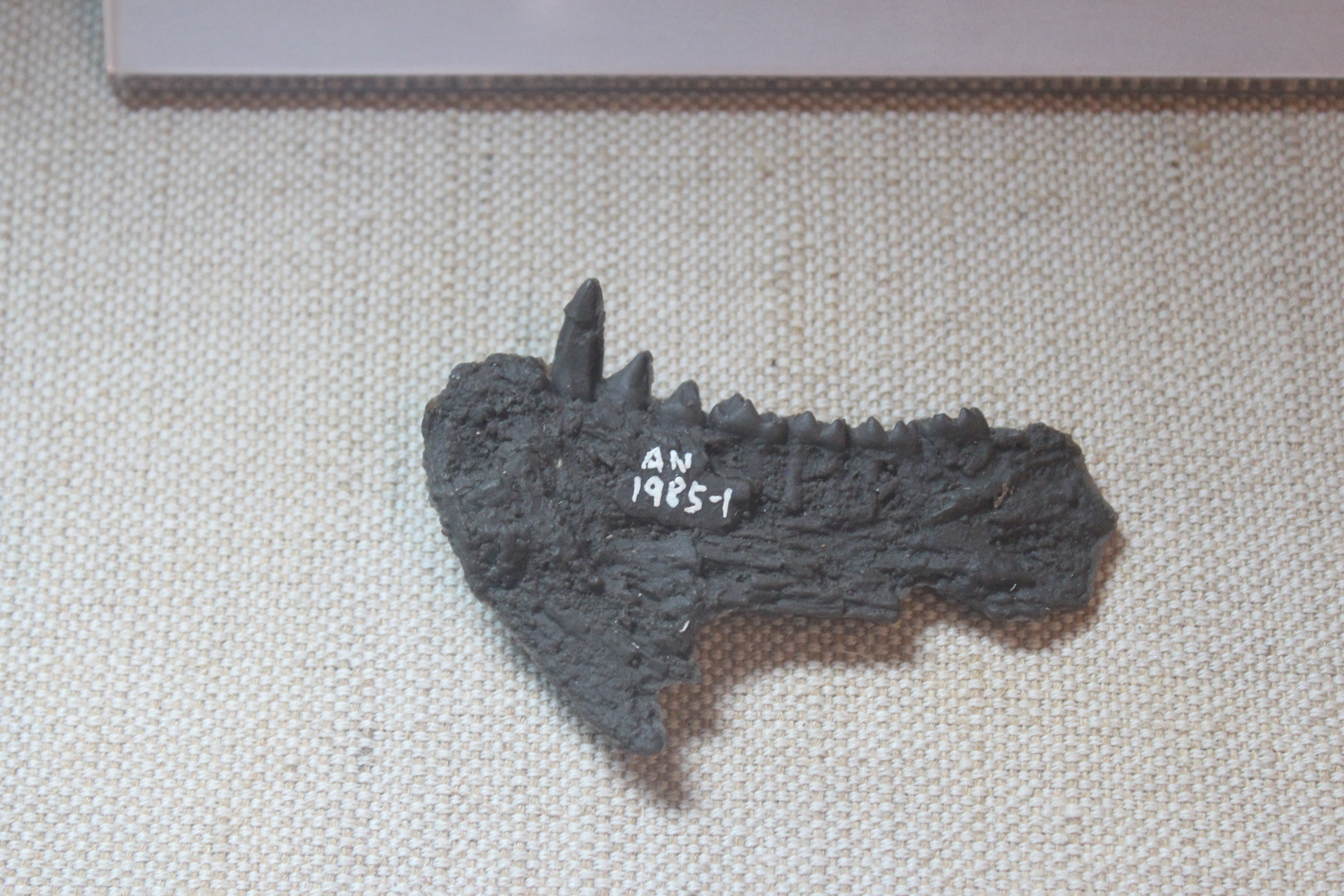
- Fossil jaw (IVPP AN 1985-1), Paleozoological Museum of China

Scientific classification
- Kingdom: Animalia
- Phylum: Chordata
- Class: Mammalia
- Order: Primates
- Suborder: Strepsirrhini
- Family: †Sivaladapidae
- Genus: †Sinoadapis; Wu & Pan, 1985
- Species: †S. carnosus

Binomial name
- †Sinoadapis carnosus Wu & Pan, 1985

= Sinoadapis =

Sinoadapis Temporal range: Late Miocene

Extinct genus of primates

Sinoadapis is a genus of adapiform primate that lived in Asia during the late Miocene.
