= Guangxilemur =

Guangxilemur Temporal range: Late Eocene

Scientific classification
- Kingdom: Animalia
- Phylum: Chordata
- Class: Mammalia
- Infraclass: Placentalia
- Order: Primates
- Suborder: Strepsirrhini
- Family: †Sivaladapidae
- Genus: †Guangxilemur; Qi & Beard, 1998
- Species: †G. tongi

Binomial name
- †Guangxilemur tongi Qi & Beard, 1998

Extinct genus of primates

Guangxilemur is a genus of adapiform primate that lived in Asia during the late Eocene.
