= Anthradapis =

Anthradapis Temporal range: Priabonian

Scientific classification
- Kingdom: Animalia
- Phylum: Chordata
- Class: Mammalia
- Order: Primates
- Suborder: Strepsirrhini
- Family: †Sivaladapidae
- Genus: †Anthradapis
- Species: †A. vietnamensis

Binomial name
- †Anthradapis vietnamensis Chavasseau et al., 2019

Extinct genus of sivaladapid primate

Anthradapis is an extinct monotypic genus of anthradapine primate that lived in what is now Southeast Asia during the Priabonian stage of the Eocene epoch.

== Etymology ==
The generic name Anthradapis is derived from the Greek word anthrax, meaning coal, and the suffix -adapis, which references the adapoid affinities of the genus. The specific epithet of the type species, Anthradapis vietnamensis, is in reference to the country of Vietnam, where the fossil was found.
