= Rencunius =

Rencunius Temporal range: Late Middle Eocene

Scientific classification
- Domain: Eukaryota
- Kingdom: Animalia
- Phylum: Chordata
- Class: Mammalia
- Order: Primates
- Suborder: Strepsirrhini
- Family: †Sivaladapidae
- Genus: †Rencunius; Gingerich et al., 1994
- Species: †R. zhoui

Binomial name
- †Rencunius zhoui Gingerich et al., 1994

Extinct genus of primates

Rencunius is a genus of adapiform primate that lived in Asia during the late middle Eocene. It includes the species Rencunius zhoui.
