= Sivaladapidae =

Sivaladapidae Temporal range: Late Eocene–Late Miocene

Scientific classification
- Kingdom: Animalia
- Phylum: Chordata
- Class: Mammalia
- Order: Primates
- Suborder: Strepsirrhini
- Superfamily: †Adapoidea
- Family: †Sivaladapidae; Thomas & Verma, 1979

Subfamily
- †Sivaladapinae; †Hoanghoniinae; †Anthradapinae

Extinct family of primates

Sivaladapidae is an extinct family of adapiform primates from Asia. They survived longer than any other adapiform primate because they were able to shift south as the climate cooled. Their remains date from the Eocene through the Miocene.

== Classification ==
- Family Sivaladapidae
  - Subfamily Sivaladapinae
  - Subfamily Hoanghoniinae
  - Subfamily Anthradapinae
    - Genus Anthradapis
  - incertae sedis
    - Genus Guangxilemur
    - Genus Kyitchaungia
    - Genus Laomaki
    - Genus Paukkaungia
    - Genus Ramadapis
    - Genus Siamoadapis
    - Genus Yunnanodapis
    - Genus Sinoadapis

== See also ==
- List of fossil primates
