= List of fossil primates =

This is a list of fossil primates—extinct primates for which a fossil record exists. Primates are generally thought to have evolved from a small, unspecialized mammal, which probably fed on insects and fruits. However, the precise source of the primates remains controversial and even their arboreal origin has recently been questioned. As it has been suggested, many other mammal orders are arboreal too, but they have not developed the same characteristics as primates. Nowadays, some well known genera, such as Purgatorius and Plesiadapis, thought to be the most ancient primates for a long time, are not usually considered as such by recent authors, who tend to include them in the new order Plesiadapiformes, within superorder Euarchontoglires. Some, to avoid confusions, employ the unranked term Euprimates, which excludes Plesiadapiformes. That denomination is not used here.

There is an academic debate on the time the first primates appeared. One of the earliest probable primate fossils is the problematic Altiatlasius koulchii, perhaps an Omomyid, but perhaps a non-Primate Plesiadapiform, which lived in Morocco, during the Paleocene, around 60 Ma. However, other studies, including molecular clock studies, have estimated the origin of the primate branch to have been in the mid-Cretaceous period, around 85 Ma, that is to say, in the time previous to the extinction of dinosaurs and the successful mammal radiation. Nevertheless, there seems to be a consensus about the monophyletic origin of the order, although the evidence is not clear.

The order Primates, established by Linnaeus in 1758, includes humans and their immediate ancestors. However, contrarily to the common opinion, most primates do not have especially large brains. Brain size is a derived character, which only appeared with genus Homo, and was lacking in the first hominid. In fact, hominid encephalization quotient is only 1.5 Ma more recent than that of some dolphin species. The encephalization quotient of some cetaceans is therefore higher than that of most primates, including the nearest relatives of humans, such as Australopithecus.

This list follows partly from Walter Carl Hartwig's 2002 book The Fossil Primate Record and John G. Fleagle's 2013 book Primate Adaptation and Evolution (3rd edition). Parentheses around authors' names (and dates) indicates a change in generic name for the fossil, as stated in the International Code of Zoological Nomenclature (ICZN). Since the publication of the book as well as the creation of this article, new fossil taxon have been discovered that has helped improved the taxonomy among primates in general.

== Strepsirrhini ==
=== Infraorder Adapiformes ===
==== Adapiformes, incertae sedis ====
- Sulaimanius Gunnell et al., 2012

- Sulaimanius arifi (Gunnell et al., 2008)

==== Adapoidea ====
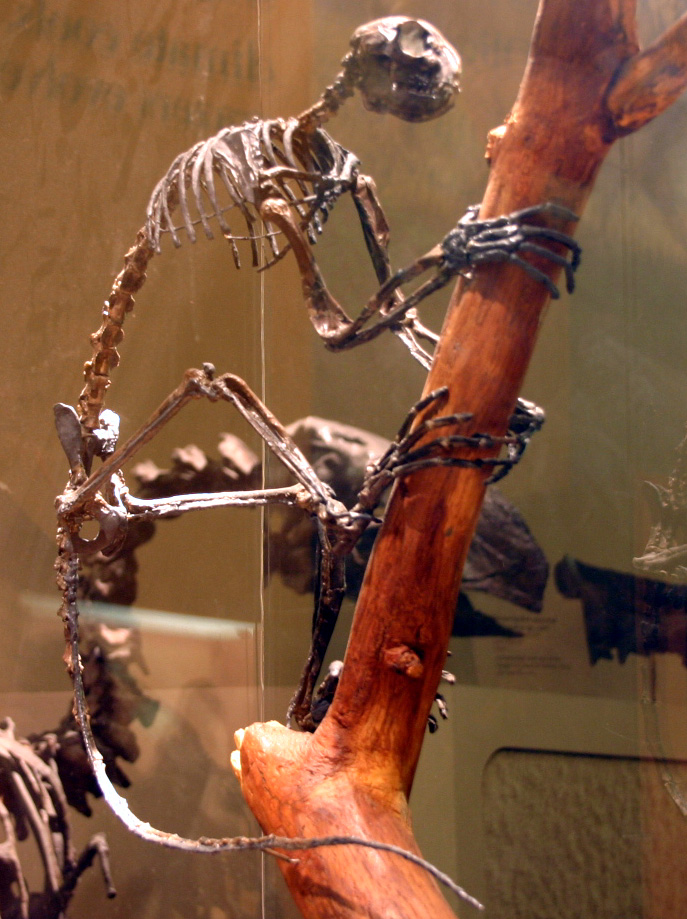
Smilodectes

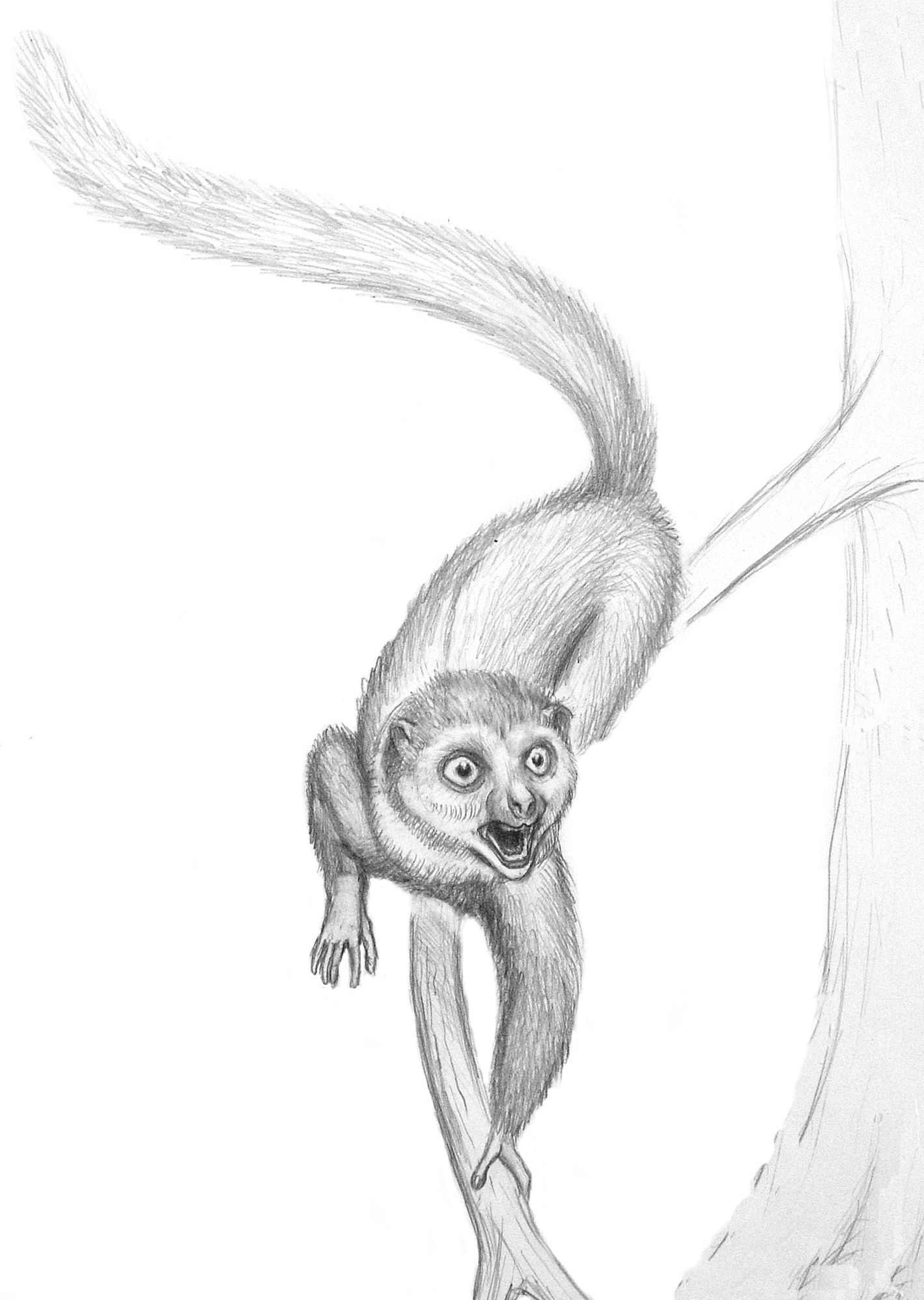
Darwinius

- Ekgmowechashalidae Szalay, 1976
  - Bugtilemur Marivaux et al., 2001
    - Bugtilemur mathesoni Marivaux et al., 2001
  - Ekgmowechashala Macdonald, 1963
    - Ekgmowechashala philotau Macdonald, 1963
    - Ekgmowechashala zancanellai Samuels, Albright & Fremd, 2015
  - Gatanthropus Ni et al., 2016
    - Gatanthropus micros Ni et al., 2016
  - Muangthanhinius Marivaux et al., 2006
    - Muangthanhinius siami Marivaux et al., 2006
- Notharctidae Trouessart, 1879
  - Notharctinae Trouessart, 1879
    - Cantius Simons, 1962
      - Cantius abditus Gingerich & Simmons, 1977
      - Cantius angulatus Cope, 1875
      - Cantius antediluvius Kihm, 1992
      - Cantius eppsi Cooper, 1932
      - Cantius frugivorus Cope, 1875
      - Cantius lohseorum Robinson, 2016
      - Cantius mckennai Gingerich & Simons, 1977
      - Cantius nuniensis Cope, 1881
      - Cantius ralstoni Matthew, 1915
      - Cantius savagei Gingerich, 1977
      - Cantius torresi Gingerich, 1986
    - Copelemur Gingerich & Simons, 1977
      - Copelemur australotutus Beard, 1988
      - Copelemur praetutus Gazin, 1962
      - Copelemur tutus Cope, 1877
    - Hesperolemur Gunnell, 1995
      - Hesperolemur actius Gunnell, 1995
    - Megaceralemur Robinson, 2016
      - Megaceralemur trigonodus (Matthew, 1915)
      - Megaceralemur matthewi Robinson, 2016
    - Notharctus Leidy, 1870
      - Notharctus pugnax Granger & Gregory, 1917
      - Notharctus robustior Leidy, 1870
      - Notharctus tenebrosus Leidy, 1870
      - Notharctus venticolus Osborn, 1902
    - Pelycodus Cope, 1875
      - Pelycodus danielsae Froehlich & Lucas, 1991
      - Pelycodus jarrovii Cope, 1874
    - Pinolophus Robinson, 2016
      - Pinolophus meikei Robinson, 2016
    - Smilodectes Wortman, 1903
      - Smilodectes gingerichi Beard, 1988
      - Smilodectes gracilis Marsh, 1871
      - Smilodectes mcgrewi Gingerich, 1979
  - Cercamoniinae Gingerich, 1975
    - Agerinia Crusafont-Pairo & Golpe-Posse, 1973
      - Agerinia marandati Femenias-Gual, Minwer-Barakat, Marigó, Poyatos-Moré, and Moyà-Solà, 2017
      - Agerinia roselli Crusafont-Pairo & Golpe-Posse, 1973
      - Agerinia smithorum Femenias-Gual, Minwer-Barakat, Marigó, and Moyà-Solà, 2016
    - Anchomomys Stehlin, 1916
      - Anchomomys crocheti Godinot, 1988
      - Anchomomys gaillardi Stehlin, 1916
      - Anchomomys pygmaeus Rütimeyer, 1890
      - Anchomomys quercy Stehlin, 1916
    - Barnesia Thalmann, 1994
      - Barnesia hauboldi Thalmann, 1994
    - Buxella Godinot, 1988
      - Buxella magna Godinot, 1988
      - Buxella prisca Godinot, 1988
    - Donrussellia Szalay, 1976
      - Donrussellia gallica Russell, Louis & Savage, 1967
      - Donrussellia louisi
      - Donrussellia magna
      - Donrussellia provincialis
      - Donrussellia russelli
    - Mazateronodon Marigó, Minwer-Barakat, & Moyà-Solà, 2010
      - Mazateronodon endemicus Marigó, Minwer-Barakat, & Moyà-Solà, 2010
    - Panobius Russell & Gingerich, 1987
      - Panobius afridi Russell & Gingerich, 1987
    - Periconodon Stehlin, 1916
      - Periconodon helleri Schwartz et al., 1983
      - Periconodon helveticus Rütimeyer, 1891
      - Periconodon huerzeleri Gingerich, 1977
      - Periconodon jaegeri Godinot, 1988
      - Periconodon lemoinei Gingerich, 1977
    - Protoadapis Lemoine, 1878
      - Protoadapis angustidens Filhol, 1888
      - Protoadapis brachyrhynchus Stehlin, 1912
      - Protoadapis curvicuspidens Lemoine, 1878
      - Protoadapis ignoratus Thalmann, 1994
      - Protoadapis muechelnensis Thalmann, 1994
      - Protoadapis recticuspidens Lemoine, 1878
      - Protoadapis weigelti Gingerich, 1977
    - Pronycticebus Grandidier, 1904
      - Pronycticebus gaudryi Grandidier, 1904
      - Pronycticebus neglectus Thalmann et al., 1989
- Asiadapidae Rose et al., 2009
  - Anthrasimias Bajpai et al., 2008
    - Anthrasimias gujaratensis Bajpai et al., 2008
  - Asiadapis Rose et al., 2007
    - Asiadapis cambayensis Rose et al., 2007
    - Asiadapis tapiensis Rose et al., 2018
  - Marcgodinotius Bajpai et al., 2005
    - Marcgodinotius indicus Bajpai et al., 2005
- Adapidae Trouessart, 1879
  - Adapinae Trouesart, 1879
    - Adapis Cuvier, 1821
      - Adapis bruni
      - Adapis collinsonae Hooker, 1986
      - Adapis parisiensis de Blainville, 1841
      - Adapis sudrei Gingerich, 1977
    - Cryptadapis Godinot, 1984
      - Cryptadapis laharpei Godinot, 1984
      - Cryptadapis tertius Godinot, 1984
    - Leptadapis Gervais, 1876
      - Leptadapis assolicus
      - Leptadapis filholi Godinot & Couette, 2008
      - Leptadapis capellae Crusafont-Pairo, 1967
      - Leptadapis leenhardti Stehlin, 1912
      - Leptadapis magnus Filhol, 1874
      - Leptadapis ruetimeyeri Stehlin, 1912
    - Magnadapis Godinot & Couette, 2008
      - Magnadapis quercyi Godinot & Couette, 2008
      - Magnadapis fredi Godinot & Couette, 2008
      - Magnadapis laurenceae Godinot & Couette, 2008
      - Magnadapis intermedius Godinot & Couette, 2008
    - Microadapis Szalay, 1974
      - Microadapis lynnae
      - Microadapis sciureus Stehlin, 1916
    - Palaeolemur Delfortrie, 1873
      - Palaeolemur betillei Delfortrie, 1873
    - Paradapis Tattersall & Schwartz 1983
      - Paradapis ruetimeyeri Stehlin 1912
      - Paradapis priscus Stehlin, 1916
  - Caenopithecinae Szalay & Delson 1979
    - Adapoides Beard et al., 1994
      - Adapoides troglodytes Beard et al., 1994
    - Afradapis Seiffert et al., 2009
      - Afradapis longicristatus Seiffert et al., 2009
    - Aframonius Simons et al., 1995
      - Aframonius diedes Simons et al., 1995
    - Caenopithecus Rütimeyer, 1862
      - Caenopithecus lemuroides Rütimeyer, 1862
    - Darwinius Franzen et al., 2009
      - Darwinius masillae Franzen et al., 2009
    - Europolemur Weigelt, 1933
      - Europolemur dunaifi Tattersall & Schwartz, 1983
      - Europolemur klatti Weigelt, 1933
      - Europolemur koenigswald Franzen, 1987
    - Godinotia Franzen, 2000
      - Godinotia neglecta Thalmann, Haubold & Martin, 1989
    - Mahgarita Wilson & Szalay, 1976
      - Mahgarita stevensi Wilson & Szalay, 1976
    - Masradapis Seiffert, Boyer, Fleagle, Gunnell, Heesy, Perry, Sallam, 2017
      - Masradapis tahai Seiffert, Boyer, Fleagle, Gunnell, Heesy, Perry, and Sallam, 2017
    - Mescalerolemur Kirk & Williams, 2011
      - Mescalerolemur horneri Kirk & Williams, 2011
- Sivaladapidae Thomas & Verma, 1979
  - Ramadapis Gilbert, Patel, Singh, Campisano, Fleagle, Rust, and Patnaik, 2017
    - Ramadapis sahnii Gilbert, Patel, Singh, Campisano, Fleagle, Rust, and Patnaik, 2017
  - Sivaladapinae Thomas & Verma, 1979
    - Indraloris Lewis, 1933
      - Indraloris himalayensis Pilgrim, 1932
      - Indraloris kamlialensis Flynn and Morgan, 2005
    - Sinoadapis Wu & Pan, 1985
      - Sinoadapis carnosus Wu & Pan, 1985
    - Sivaladapis Gingerich & Sahni, 1979
      - Sivaladapis nagrii Prasad, 1970
      - Sivaladapis palaendicus Pilgrim, 1932
  - Hoanghoniinae Gingerich et al., 1994
    - Hoanghonius Zdansky, 1930
      - Hoanghonius stehlini Zdansky, 1930
    - Lushius Chow, 1961
      - Lushius qinlinensis Chow, 1961
    - Rencunius Gingerich et al., 1994
      - Rencunius zhoui Gingerich et al., 1994
    - Wailekia Ducrocq et al., 1995
      - Wailekia orientale Ducrocq et al., 1995
  - incertae sedis
    - Guangxilemur Qi & Beard, 1998
      - Guangxilemur tongi Qi & Beard, 1998
    - Kyitchaungia Beard et al. 2007
      - Kyitchaungia takaii Beard et al. 2007
    - Laomaki Ni et al. 2016
      - Laomaki yunnanensis Ni et al. 2016
    - Paukkaungia Beard et al. 2007
      - Paukkaungia parva Beard et al. 2007
    - Siamoadapis Chaimanee et al., 2007
      - Siamoadapis maemohensis Chaimanee et al., 2007
    - Yunnanadapis Ni et al. 2016
      - Yunnanadapis folivorus Ni et al. 2016
      - Yunnanadapis imperator Ni et al. 2016

=== Infraorder Chiromyiformes ===
- Daubentoniidae Gray, 1863

- Daubentonia É. Geoffroy Saint-Hilaire, 1795

- Daubentonia robusta Lamberton, 1934

- Plesiopithecidae Simons and Rasmussen, 1994

- Plesiopithecus Simons, 1992

- Plesiopithecus teras Simons, 1992

- Propottidae Butler, 1984

- Propotto Simpson, 1967

- Propotto leakeyi Simpson, 1967

=== Infraorder Lemuriformes ===
==== Basal stem group Lemuriformes ====
- Family Azibiidae Gingerich, 1976

- Algeripithecus Godinot & Mahboubi, 1992

- Algeripithecus minutus Godinot & Mahboubi, 1992

- Azibius Sudre, 1975

- Azibius trerki Sudre, 1975

- Djebelemuridae Hartenberger and Marandat, 1992

- unnamed ('Anchomomys')

- 'Anchomomys' milleri Simons, 1997

- Djebelemur Hartenberger and Marandat, 1992

- Djebelemur martinezi Hartenberger & Marandat, 1992

- Namaia Pickford et al., 2008

- Namaia bogenfelsi Pickford et al., 2008

- Omanodon Gheerbrant et al., 1993

- Omanodon minor Gheerbrant et al., 1993

- Shizarodon Gheerbrant et al., 1993

- Shizarodon dhofarensis Gheerbrant et al., 1993

- Plesiopithecidae Simons and Rasmussen, 1994

- Plesiopithecus Simons, 1992

- Plesiopithecus teras Simons, 1992

==== Lemuroidea ====
Subfossil lemurs:

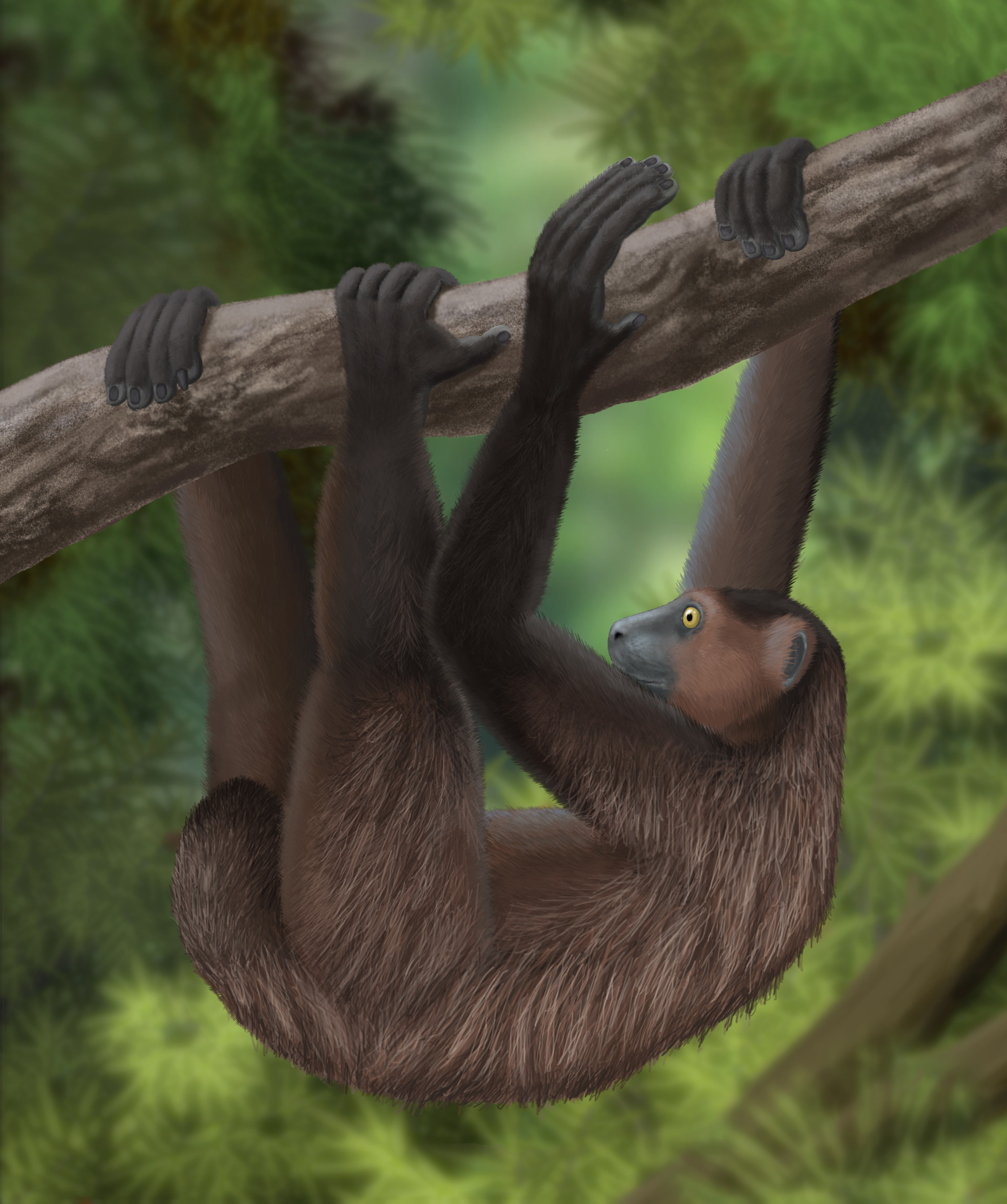
Babakotia radofilai

- Archaeolemuridae G. Grandier, 1905

- Archaeolemur Filhol, 1895

- Archaeolemur edwardsi Filhol, 1895
- Archaeolemur majori Filhol, 1895

- Hadropithecus Lorenz von Liburnau, 1899

- Hadropithecus stenognathus Lorenz von Liburnau, 1899

- Palaeopropithecidae Tattersall, 1973

- Mesopropithecus Standing, 1905

- Mesopropithecus dolichobrachion Simons et al., 1995
- Mesopropithecus globiceps Lamberton, 1936
- Mesopropithecus pithecoides Standing, 1905

- Babakotia Godfrey et al., 1990

- Babakotia radofilai Godfrey et al., 1990

- Palaeopropithecus G. Grandidier, 1899

- Palaeopropithecus ingens G. Grandidier, 1899
- Palaeopropithecus kelyus Gommery et al., 2010
- Palaeopropithecus maximus Standing, 1903

- Archaeoindris Standing, 1909

- Archaeoindris fontoynontii Standing, 1909

- Megaladapidae Forsyth-Major, 1894

- Megaladapis Forsyth-Major, 1894

- Subgenus: Megaladapis

- Megaladapis (Megaladapis) grandidieri Standing, 1903
- Megaladapis (Megaladapis) madagascariensis Forsyth-Major, 1894

- Subgenus: Peloriadapis

- Megaladapis (Peloriadapis) edwardsi Grandidier, 1899

- Lemuridae Gray, 1821

- Pachylemur Lamberton, 1946

- Pachylemur insignis Filhol, 1895
- Pachylemur jullyi Lamberton, 1948

=== Lorisiformes ===
- Lorisidae Gray, 1821

- Karanisia Seiffert et al., 2003

- Karanisia clarki Seiffert et al., 2003

- Mioeuoticus Leakey, 1962

- Mioeuoticus bishopi Leakey, 1962
- Mioeuoticus kichotoi Kunimatsu, Tsujikawa, Nakatsukasa, Shimizu, Ogihara, Kikuchi, Nakano, Takano, Morimoto, and Ishida, 2017
- Mioeuoticus shipmani Phillips & Walker, 2000

- Nycticeboides Jacobs, 1981

- Nycticeboides simpsoni Jacobs, 1981

- Galagidae Gray, 1825

- Galago Geoffroy, 1796

- Galago farafraensis Pickford, Wanas & Soliman, 2006
- Galago howelli Wesselman, 1984
- Galago sadimanensis Walker, 1987

- Komba Simpson, 1967

- Komba minor Le Gros Clark & Thomas, 1952
- Komba robustus Le Gros Clark & Thomas, 1952
- Komba winamensis McCrossin, 1992

- Progalago MacInnes, 1943

- Progalago dorae MacInnes, 1943
- Progalago songhorensis Simpson, 1967

- Saharagalago Seiffert et al., 2003

- Saharagalago misrensis Seiffert et al., 2003

- Wadilemur Simons, 1997

- Wadilemur elegans Simons, 1997

== Haplorhini ==
- Teilhardina Simpson, 1940

- Teilhardina asiatica Ni et al., 2004
- Teilhardina belgica (Teilhard de Chardin, 1927)

=== Tarsiiformes ===
==== Tarsiiformes, incertae sedis ====
- Altanius Dashzeveg & McKenna, 1977

- Altanius orlovi Dashzeveg & McKenna, 1977

- Altiatlasius Sigé et al., 1990

- Altiatlasius koulchii Sigé et al., 1990

==== Archicebidae ====
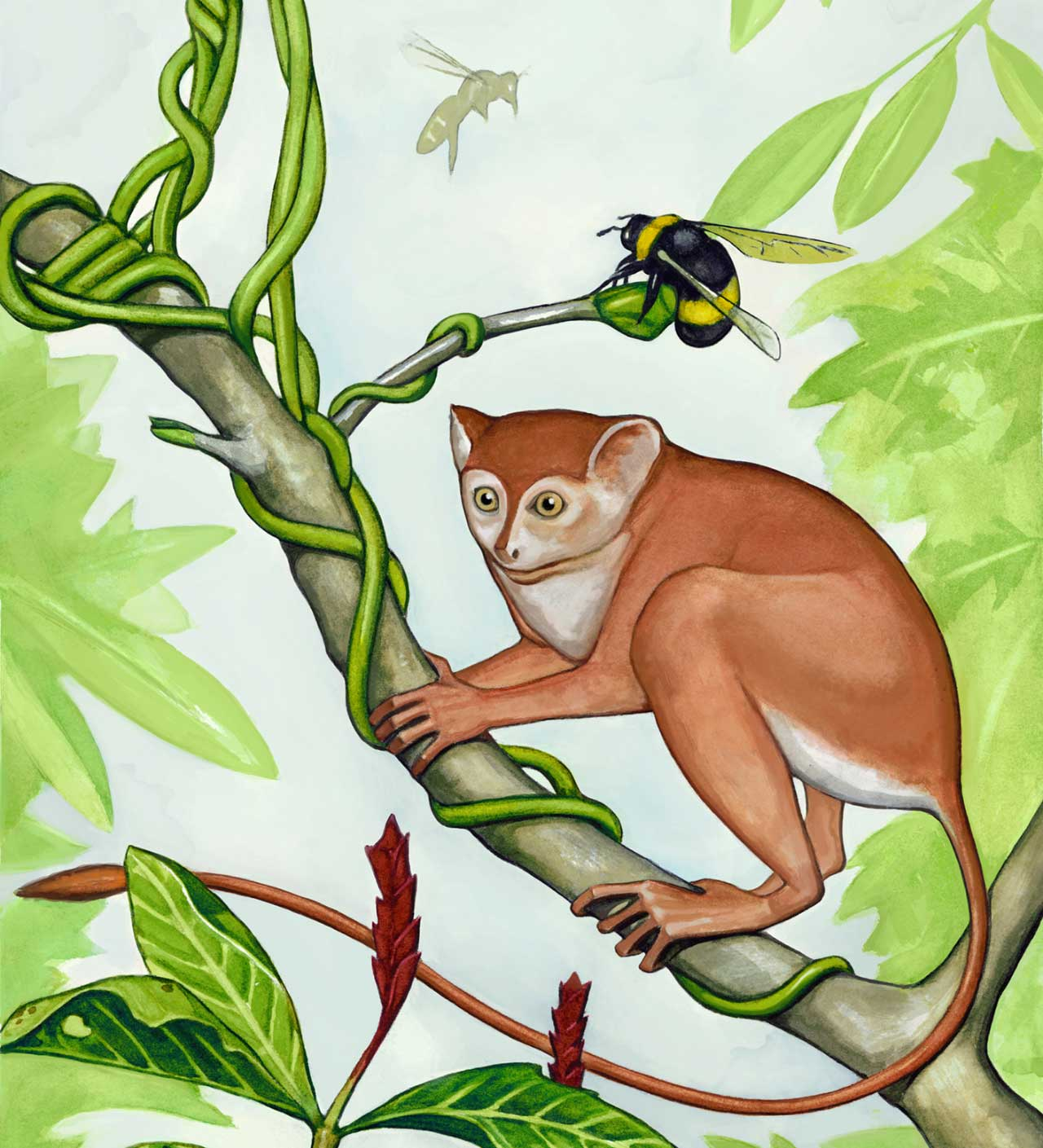
An artist's reconstruction of Archicebus achilles.

- Archicebus Ni et al., 2013

- Archicebus achilles Ni et al., 2013

==== Omomyoidea ====
- Omomyidae Trouessart, 1879

- Baataromomys Ni, Beard, Meng, Wang, and Gebo, 2007

- Baataromomys ulaanus Ni, Beard, Meng, Wang, and Gebo, 2007

- Kohatius Russell & Gingerich, 1980

- Kohatius coppensi Russell & Gingerich, 1980

- Microchoerinae Lydekker, 1887

- Melaneremia Hooker, 2007

- Melaneremia bryanti Hooker, 2007

- Microchoerus Wood, 1846

- Microchoerus creechbarrowensis Hooker, 1986
- Microchoerus edwardsi Filhol, 1880
- Microchoerus erinaceus Wood, 1846
- Microchoerus hookeri Minwer-Barakat, Marigó, Femenias-Gual, Costeur, Esteban-Trivigno, and Moyà-Solà, 2017
- Microchoerus ornatus Stehlin, 1916
- Microchoerus wardi Hooker, 1986

- Necrolemur Filhol, 1873

- Necrolemur anadoni Minwer-Barakat, Marigó & Moyà-Solà, 2015
- Necrolemur antiquus Filhol, 1873
- Necrolemur zitteli Schlosser, 1887

- Nannopithex Stehlin, 1916

- Nannopithex filholi Chantre & Gaillard, 1897
- Nannopithex humilidens Thalmann, 1994
- Nannopithex quaylei Hooker, 1986
- Nannopithex raabi Heller, 1930
- Nannopithex zuccolae Godinot et al., 1992

- Pseudoloris Stehlin, 1916

- Pseudoloris crusafonti Louis & Sudre, 1975
- Pseudoloris godinoti Köhler & Moyà-Solà, 1999
- Pseudoloris isabenae Crusafont-Pairo, 1967
- Pseudoloris parvulus Filhol, 1890

- Anaptomorphinae Cope, 1883

- Tribe: Anaptomorphini

- Anaptomorphus Cope, 1872

- Anaptomorphus aemulus Cope, 1872
- Anaptomorphus westi Szalay, 1976

- Tetonius Matthew, 1915

- Tetonius homunculus Cope, 1882
- Tetonius matthewi Bown & Rose, 1987
- Tetonius mckennai Bown & Rose, 1987

- Absarokius Matthew, 1915

- Absarokius abbotti Loomis, 1906
- Absarokius australis Bown & Rose, 1987
- Absarokius nocerai Robinson, 1966
- Absarokius metoecus Bown & Rose, 1987
- Absarokius witteri Morris, 1954

- "Teilhardina" Simpson, 1940

- Teilhardina brandti Gingerich, 1993
- "Teilhardina" demissa Rose, 1995
- "Teilhardina" gingerichi Rose, Chew, Dunn, Kraus, Fricke, and Zack, 2012
- "Teilhardina" tenuicula Jepsen, 1930

- Bownomomys Morse et al., 2018

- Bownomomys americanus (Bown, 1976)
- Bownomomys crassidens )Bown & Rose, 1987)

- Anemorhysis Gazin, 1958

- Anemorhysis natronensis Beard et al., 1992
- Anemorhysis pattersoni Bown & Rose, 1984
- Anemorhysis pearcei Gazin, 1962
- Anemorhysis savagei Williams & Covert, 1994
- Anemorhysis sublettensis Gazin, 1952
- Anemorhysis wortmani Bown & Rose, 1984

- Chlororhysis Gazin, 1958

- Chlororhysis incomptus Bown & Rose, 1984
- Chlororhysis knightensis Gazin, 1958

- Pseudotetonius Bown, 1974

- Pseudotetonius ambiguus Bown, 1974

- Arapahovius Savage & Waters, 1978

- Arapahovius advena Bown & Rose, 1991
- Arapahovius gazini Savage & Waters, 1978

- Aycrossia Bown, 1979

- Aycrossia lovei Bown, 1979

- Strigorhysis Bown, 1979

- Strigorhysis bridgerensis Bown, 1979
- Strigorhysis huerfanensis Bown & Rose, 1987
- Strigorhysis rugosus Bown, 1979

- Gazinius Bown, 1979

- Gazinius amplus Bown, 1979
- Gazinius bowni Gunnell, 1995

- Tatmanius Bown & Rose, 1991

- Tatmanius szalayi Bown & Rose, 1991

- Tribe: Trogolemurini

- Trogolemur Matthew, 1909

- Trogolemur amplior Beard et al., 1992
- Trogolemur fragilis Beard et al., 1992
- Trogolemur myodes Matthew, 1909

- Sphacorhysis Gunnell, 1995

- Sphacorhysis burntforkensis Gunnell, 1995

- Walshina López-Torres, Silcox, and Holroyd, 2018

- Walshina esmaraldensis López-Torres, Silcox, and Holroyd, 2018
- Walshina mcgrewi (Robinson, 1968)
- Walshina shifrae (Krishtalka, 1978)

- Omomyinae Trouessart, 1879

- Brontomomys Atwater and Kirk, 2018

- Brontomomys cerutti Atwater and Kirk, 2018

- Diablomomys Williams and Kirk, 2008

- Diablomomys dalquesti Williams and Kirk, 2008

- Ekwiiyemakius Atwater and Kirk, 2018

- Ekwiiyemakius walshi Atwater and Kirk, 2018

- Gunnelltarsius Atwater and Kirk, 2018

- Gunnelltarsius randalli Atwater and Kirk, 2018

- Tribe: Omomyiini

- Omomys Leidy, 1869

- Omomys carteri Leidy, 1869
- Omomys lloydi Gazin, 1958

- Steinius Bown & Rose, 1984

- Steinius annectens Bown & Rose, 1991
- Steinius vespertinus Matthew, 1915

- Chumashius Stock, 1933

- Chumashius balchi Stock, 1933

- Tribe: Washakiini

- Washakius Leidy, 1873

- Washakius insignis Leidy, 1873
- Washakius izetti Honey, 1990
- Washakius laurae Simpson, 1959
- Washakius woodringi Stock, 1938

- Shoshonius Granger, 1910

- Shoshonius bowni Honey, 1990
- Shoshonius cooperi Granger, 1910

- Dyseolemur Stock, 1934

- Dyseolemur pacificus Stock, 1934

- Loveina Simpson, 1940

- Loveina minuta Loomis, 1906
- Loveina wapitiensis Gunnell et al., 1992
- Loveina zephyri Simpson, 1940

- Tribe: Utahiini

- Utahia Gazin, 1958

- Utahia carina Muldoon and Gunnell, 2002
- Utahia kayi Gazin, 1958

- Stockia Gazin, 1958

- Stockia powayensis Gazin, 1958

- Chipetaia Rasmussen, 1996

- Chipetaia lamporea Rasmussen, 1996

- Asiomomys Wang & Li, 1990

- Asiomomys changbaicus Wang & Li, 1990

- Tribe: Ourayiini

- Wyomomys Gunnell, 1995

- Wyomomys bridgeri Gunnell, 1995

- Ageitodendron Gunnell, 1995

- Ageitodendron matthewi Gunnell, 1995

- Ourayia Gazin, 1958

- Ourayia hopsoni Robinson, 1968
- Ourayia uintensis Osborn, 1895

- Tribe: Macrotarsiini

- Macrotarsius Clark, 1941

- Macrotarsius jepseni Robinson, 1968
- Macrotarsius macrorhysis Beard et al., 1994
- Macrotarsius montanus Clark, 1941
- Macrotarsius roederi Kelly, 1990
- Macrotarsius siegerti Robinson, 1968

- Hemiacodon Marsh, 1872

- Hemiacodon casamissus Beard et al., 1992
- Hemiacodon gracilis Marsh, 1872

- Yaquius Mason, 1990

- Yaquius travisi Mason, 1990

- Tribe: Uintaniini

- Uintanius Matthew, 1915

- Uintanius ameghini Wortman, 1904
- Uintanius rutherfurdi Robinson, 1966

- Jemezius Beard, 1987

- Jemezius szalayi Beard, 1987

- Tribus: Rooneyini

- Rooneyia Wilson, 1966

- Rooneyia viejaensis Wilson, 1966

- Tarsiidae Gray, 1825

- Hesperotarsius Zijlstra, Flynn, and Wessels, 2013

- Hesperotarsius sindhensis Zijlstra, Flynn, and Wessels, 2013
- Hesperotarsius thailandicus (Ginsburg & Mein, 1987)

- Oligotarsius Ni et al., 2016

- Oligotarsius rarus Ni et al., 2016

- Tarsius Storr, 1780

- "Tarsius" eocaenus Beard et al., 1994
- "Tarsius" sirindhornae Chaimanee et al., 2011

- Xanthorhysis Beard, 1998

- Xanthorhysis tabrumi Beard, 1998

=== Eosimiiformes ===
==== Afrotarsiidae ====
- Afrasia Chaimanee et al. 2012

- Afrasia djijidae Chaimanee et al. 2012

- Afrotarsius Simons & Bown, 1985

- Afrotarsius chatrathi Simons & Bown, 1985
- Afrotarsius libycus Jaeger et al., 2010

==== Eosimiidae ====
- Eosimias Beard et al., 1994

- Eosimias centennicus Beard et al., 1996
- Eosimias sinensis Beard et al., 1994

- Bahinia Jaeger et al., 1999

- Bahinia banyueae Li et al., 2016
- Bahinia pondaungensis Jaeger et al., 1999

- Phileosimias Marivaux, Antoine, Baqri, Benammi, and Chaimanee, 2005

- Phileosimias brahuiorum Marivaux, Antoine, Baqri, Benammi, and Chaimanee, 2005
- Phileosimias kamali Marivaux, Antoine, Baqri, Benammi, and Chaimanee, 2005

- Phenacopithecus Beard and Wang, 2004

- Phenacopithecus krishtalkai Beard and Wang, 2004
- Phenacopithecus xueshii Beard and Wang, 2004

=== Simiiformes ===
==== Simiiformes, incertae sedis ====
- Amphipithecidae Godinot, 1994

- Pondaungia Pilgrim, 1927

- Pondaungia cotteri Pilgrim, 1927

- Amphipithecus Colbert, 1937

- Amphipithecus mogaungensis Colbert, 1937

- Krabia Chaimanee et al., 2013

- Krabia minuta Chaimanee et al., 2013

- Siamopithecus Chaimanee et al., 1997

- Siamopithecus eocaenus Chaimanee et al., 1997

- Proteopithecidae Simons, 1997

- Proteopithecus Simons, 1989

- Proteopithecus sylviae Simons, 1989

- Serapia Simons, 1992

- Serapia eocaena Simons, 1992

- Parapithecidae Schlosser, 1911

- Arsinoea Simons, 1992

- Arsinoea kallimos Simons, 1992

- Apidium Osborn, 1908

- Apidium bowni Simons, 1995
- Apidium moustafai Simons, 1962
- Apidium phiomense Osborn, 1908

- Parapithecus Schlosser, 1910

- Parapithecus fraasi Schlosser, 1910
- Parapithecus grangeri Simons, 1974

- Qatrania Simons & Kay, 1983

- Qatrania fleaglei Simons & Kay, 1988
- Qatrania wingi Simons & kay, 1983

- Biretia Bonis et al., 1988

- Biretia piveteaui Bonis et al., 1988
- Biretia fayumensis Seiffert et al., 2005
- Biretia megalopsis Seiffert et al., 2005

==== Platyrrhini ====
- Platyrrhini, incertae sedis
  - Branisella Hoffstetter, 1969
    - Branisella boliviana Hoffstetter, 1969
- Atelidae Gray, 1825
  - Pitheciinae Mivart, 1865
  - Tribus: Callicebini
    - Xenothrix Williams & Koopman, 1952
      - Xenothrix mcgregori Williams & Koopman, 1952
    - Antillothrix MacPhee et al., 1995
      - Antillothrix bernensis Rímoli, 1977
    - Paralouatta Rivero & Arredondo, 1991
      - Paralouatta varonai Rivero & Arredondo, 1991
      - Paralouatta marianae
  - Tribus: Pitheciini
    - Soriacebus Fleagle et al., 1987
      - Soriacebus adrianae Fleagle, 1990
      - Soriacebus ameghinorum Fleagle et al., 1987
    - Proteropithecia Kay et al., 1999
      - Proteropithecia neuquenensis Kay et al., 1998
    - Cebupithecia Stirton & Savage, 1951
      - Cebupithecia sarmientoi Stirton & Savage, 1951
    - Nuciruptor Meldrum & Kay, 1997
      - Nuciruptor rubricae Meldrum & Kay, 1997
  - Tribus: Homunculini
    - Homunculus Ameghino, 1891
      - Homunculus patagonicus Ameghino, 1891
    - Carlocebus Fleagle, 1990
      - Carlocebus carmenensis Fleagle, 1990
      - Carlocebus intermedius Fleagle, 1990
  - Atelinae Gray, 1825
  - Tribus: Alouattini
    - Stirtonia Hershkovitz, 1970
      - Stirtonia tatacoensis Stirton, 1951
      - Stirtonia victoriae Kay et al., 1987
  - Tribus: Atelini
    - Caipora Cartelle & Hartwig, 1996
      - Caipora bambuiorum Cartelle & Hartwig, 1996
  - Atelinae, incertae sedis
    - Protopithecus Lund, 1838
      - Protopithecus brasiliensis Lund, 1838
- Cebidae Bonaparte, 1831
  - Cebinae Bonaparte, 1831
  - Tribus: Saimiriini
    - Neosaimiri Stirton, 1951
      - Neosaimiri fieldsi Stirton, 1951
    - Laventiana Rosenberger et al., 1991
      - Laventiana annectens Rosenberger et al., 1991
    - Dolichocebus Kraglievich, 1951
      - Dolichocebus gaimanensis Kraglievich, 1951
  - Cebinae, incertae sedis
    - Chilecebus Flynn & al, 1995
      - Chilecebus carrascoensis Flynn & al, 1995
    - Killikaike Tejedor et al., 2006
      - Killikaike blakei Tejedor et al., 2006
  - Aotinae Elliot, 1913
    - Aotus Illiger, 1811
      - Aotus dindensis Setoguchi & Rosenberger, 1987
  - Aotinae, incertae sedis
    - Tremacebus Hershkovitz, 1974
      - Tremacebus harringtoni Rusconi, 1933
  - Callitrichinae Thomas, 1903
  - Tribus: Callimiconi
    - Mohanamico Luchterhand et al., 1986
      - Mohanamico hershkovitzi Luchterhand et al., 1986
  - Callitrichinae, incertae sedis
    - Patasola Kay & Meldrum, 1997
      - Patasola magdalenae Kay & Meldrum, 1997
    - Lagonimico Kay, 1994
      - Lagonimico conclutatus Kay, 1994
    - Micodon Setoguchi & Rosenberger, 1985
      - Micodon kiotensis Setoguchi & Rosenberger, 1985

==== Catarrhini ====
===== Catarrhini, incertae sedis =====
- Limnopithecus Hopwood, 1933

- Limnopithecus evansi MacInnes, 1943
- Limnopithecus legetet Hopwood, 1933

- Kalepithecus Harrison, 1988

- Kalepithecus songhorensis Andrews, 1978
- Kalepithecus kogolensis Pickford et al., 2017

- Kamoyapithecus Leakey et al., 1995

- Kamoyapithecus hamiltoni Madden, 1980

- Kogolepithecus Pickford et al., 2003

- Kogolepithecus morotoensis Pickford et al., 2003

===== Propliothecoidea =====
- Oligopithecidae Kay & Williams, 1994

- Catopithecus Simons, 1989

- Catopithecus browni Simons, 1989

- Oligopithecus Simons, 1962

- Oligopithecus rogeri Gheerbrant et al., 1995
- Oligopithecus savagei Simons, 1962

- Talahpithecus Jaeger et al., 2010

- Talahpithecus parvus Jaeger et al., 2010

- Propliopithecidae Straus, 1961

- Moeripithecus Schlosser, 1910

- Moeripithecus markgrafi Schlosser, 1910

- Propliopithecus Schlosser, 1910

- Propliopithecus ankeli Simons et al., 1987
- Propliopithecus chirobates Simons, 1965
- Propliopithecus haeckeli Schlosser, 1910

- Aegyptopithecus Simons, 1965

- Aegyptopithecus zeuxis Simons, 1965

===== Pliopithecoidea =====
- Pliopithecidae Zapfe, 1960
  - Lomorupithecus Rossie and MacLatchy, 2006
    - Lomorupithecus harrisoni Rossie and MacLatchy, 2006
  - Dionysopithecidae
    - Dionysopithecus Li, 1978
      - Dionysopithecus orientalis Suteethorn et al., 1990
      - Dionysopithecus shuangouensis Li, 1978
    - Platodontopithecus Li, 1978
      - Platodontopithecus jianghuaiensis Li, 1978
  - Pliopithecidae
    - Epipliopithecus Zapfe & Hurzeler, 1957
      - Epipliopithecus vindobonensis Zapfe & Hurzeler, 1957
    - Pliopithecus Gervais, 1849
      - Pliopithecus antiquus Gervais, 1849
      - Pliopithecus piveteaui Hürzeler, 1954
      - Pliopithecus platyodon Bidermann, 1863
      - Pliopithecus zhanxiangi Harrison et al., 1991
    - Egarapithecus Moyà-Solà et al., 2001
      - Egarapithecus narcisoi Moyà-Solà et al., 2001
  - Crouzeliinae Ginsburg & Mein, 1980
    - Plesiopliopithecus Zapfe, 1961
      - Plesiopliopithecus auscitanensis Bergounioux & Crouzel, 1965
      - Plesiopliopithecus lockeri Zapfe, 1961
      - Plesiopliopithecus priensis Welcomme et al., 1991
      - Plesiopliopithecus rhodanica Ginsburg & Mein, 1980
    - Anapithecus Kretzoi, 1975
      - Anapithecus hernyaki Kretzoi, 1975
    - Laccopithecus Wu & Pan, 1984
      - Laccopithecus robustus Wu & Pan, 1984
  - Krishnapithecidae
    - Krishnapithecus Ginsburg & Mein, 1980
      - Krishnapithecus krishnaii Ginsburg & Mein, 1980

- Pliopithecoidea, incertae sedis

- Paidopithex Pohlig, 1895

- Paidopithex rhenanus Pohlig, 1895

===== Dendropithecoidea =====
- Dendropithecidae Harrison, 2002

- Dendropithecus Andrews & Simons, 1977

- Dendropithecus macinnesi Le Gros Clark & Leakey, 1950
- Dendropithecus ugandensis Pickford et al., 2010

- Micropithecus Fleagle & Simons, 1978

- Micropithecus clarki Fleagle & Simons, 1978
- Micropithecus leakeyorum Harrison, 1989

- Simiolus Leakey & Leakey, 1987

- Simiolus andrewsi Harrison, 2010
- Simiolus cheptumoae Pickford & Kunimatsu, 2005
- Simiolus enjiessi Leakey & Leakey, 1987
- Simiolus minutus Rossie & Hill, 2018

===== Saadanioidea =====
- Saadaniidae Zalmout et al., 2010

- Saadanius Zalmout et al., 2010

- Saadanius hijazensis Zalmout et al. 2010

===== Cercopithecoidea =====
- Nsungwepithecus Stevens et al., 2013
  - Nsungwepithecus gunnelli Stevens et al., 2013
- Victoriapithecidae von Koenigswald, 1969

- Victoriapithecus von Koenigswald, 1969

- Victoriapithecus macinnesi von Koenigswald, 1969

- Prohylobates Fourtau, 1918

- Prohylobates tandyi Fourtau, 1918
- Prohylobates simonsi Delson, 1979

- Noropithecus Miller et al. 2009

- Noropithecus bulukensis Miller et al. 2009

- Cercopithecidae Gray, 1821
  - Colobinae Jernon, 1867
  - Tribus: Colobini
    - Microcolobus Benefit & Pickford, 1986
      - Microcolobus tugenensis Benefit & Pickford, 1986
    - Rhinocolobus M.G. Leakey, 1982
      - Rhinocolobus turkanaensis M.G. Leakey, 1982
  - Colobinae, incertae sedis
    - Mesopithecus Wagner, 1839
      - Mesopithecus pentelicus Wagner, 1839
      - Mesopithecus monspessulanus Gervais, 1849
      - Mesopithecus sivalensis (Lydekker, 1878)
    - Myanmarcolobus Takai et al., 2015
      - Myanmarcolobus yawensis Takai et al., 2015
    - Rhinopithecus É. Geoffroy Saint-Hilaire, 1812
      - Subgenus: Rhinopithecus É. Geoffroy Saint-Hilaire, 1812
      - Rhinopithecus (Rhinopithecus) lantianensis Hu & Qi, 1978
    - Dolichopithecus Depéret, 1889
      - Dolichopithecus ruscinensis Depéret, 1889
    - Libypithecus Stromer, 1913
      - Libypithecus markgrafi Stromer, 1913
    - Semnopithecus Desmarest, 1822
      - Semnopithecus gwebinnensis Takai et al., 2016
    - Parapresbytis Kalmykov & Maschenko, 1992
      - Parapresbytis eohanuman (Borissoglebskaya, 1981)
    - Cercopithecoides Mollett, 1947
      - Cercopithecoides kimeui M.G. Leakey, 1982
      - Cercopithecoides williamsi Mollett, 1947
    - Paracolobus R.E.F. Leakey, 1969
      - Paracolobus chemeroni R.E.F. Leakey, 1969
      - Paracolobus mutiwa M.G. Leakey, 1969
  - Cercopithecinae Gray, 1821
  - Tribus: Papionini
  - Subtribus: Macanina
    - Macaca Lacépède, 1799
      - Macaca anderssoni Schlosser, 1924
      - Macaca florentina Cocchi, 1872
      - Macaca jiangchuanensis Pan et al., 1992
      - Macaca libyca Stromer, 1920
      - Macaca majori Schaub & Azzaroli in Comaschi Caria, 1969 (sometimes included in M. sylvanus)
      - ?Macaca palaeindicus (Lydekker, 1884)
    - Procynocephalus Schlosser, 1924
      - Procynocephalus subhimalayanus von Meyer, 1848
      - Procynocephalus wimani Schlosser, 1924
    - Paradolichopithecus Necrasov et al., 1961
      - Paradolichopithecus arvernensis (Depéret, 1929)
  - Subtribus: Papionina
    - Parapapio Jones, 1937
      - Parapapio ado Hopwood, 1936
      - Parapapio broomi Jones, 1937
      - Parapapio jonesi Broom, 1940
      - Parapapio whitei Broom, 1940
      - Parapapio lothagamensis Leakey, Teaford, and Ward, 2003
    - Procercocebus Gilbert, 2007
      - Procercocebus antiquus (Haughton, 1925)
    - Dinopithecus Broom, 1937
      - Dinopithecus ingens Broom, 1937
    - Gorgopithecus Broom & Robinson, 1946
      - Gorgopithecus major Broom, 1940
    - Theropithecus I. Geoffroy Saint-Hilaire, 1843
      - Subgenus: Theropithecus Delson, 1993
      - Theropithecus (Theropithecus) darti Broom & Jensen, 1946
      - Theropithecus (Theropithecus) oswaldi Andrews, 1916
      - Subgenus: Omopithecus Delson, 1993
      - Theropithecus (Omopithecus) baringensis R.E.F. Leakey, 1969
      - Theropithecus (Omopithecus) brumpti Arambourg, 1947
    - Soromandrillus Gilbert, 2013
      - Soromandrillus quadratirostris (Iwamoto, 1982)
    - Papio Erxleben, 1777
      - Papio izodi Gear, 1926
      - Papio robinsoni Freedman, 1957

===== Hominoidea =====
- Hominoidea, incertae sedis

- Otavipithecus Conroy et al., 1992

- Otavipithecus namibiensis Conroy et al., 1992

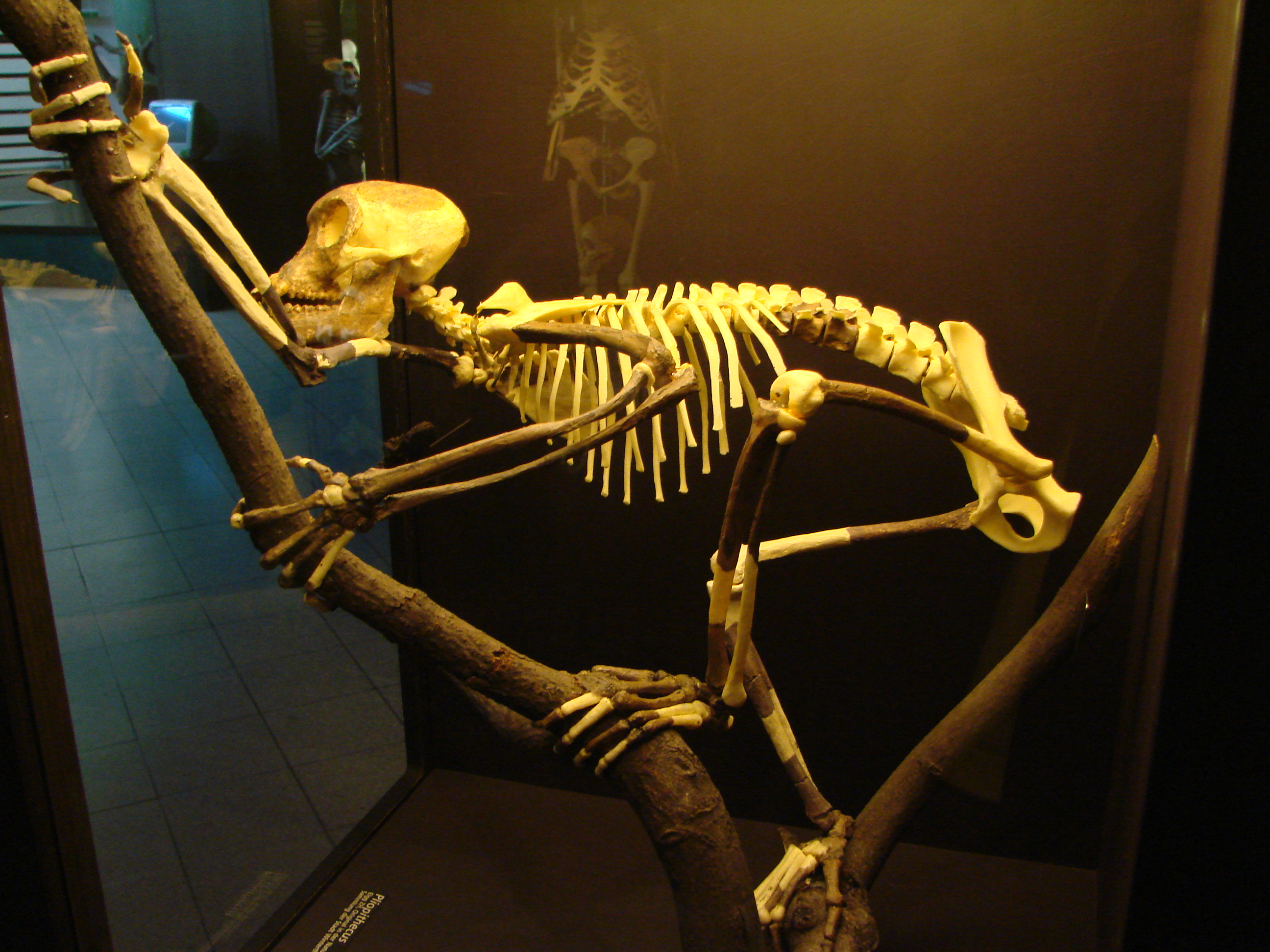
Proconsul

- Proconsulidae Leakey, 1963

- Proconsulinae Leakey, 1963

- Ekembo McNulty et al., 2015

- Ekembo heseloni (Walker et al., 1993)
- Ekembo nyanzae (Le Gros Clark & Leakey, 1950)

- Proconsul Hopwood, 1933

- Proconsul africanus Hopwood, 1933
- Proconsul gitongai (Pickford and Kunimatsu, 2005)
- Proconsul major Le Gros Clark & Leakey, 1950
- Proconsul meswae Harrison and Andrews, 2009

- Nyanzapithecinae Harrison, 2002

- Nyanzapithecus Harrison, 1986

- Nyanzapithecus alesi Nengo, Tafforeau, Gilbert, Fleagle, Miller, Feibel, Fox, Feinberg, Pugh, Berruyer, Mana, Engle, Spoor, 2017
- Nyanzapithecus harrisoni Kunimatsu, 1997
- Nyanzapithecus pickfordi Harrison, 1986
- Nyanzapithecus vancouveringorum Andrews, 1974

- Mabokopithecus von Koenigswald, 1969
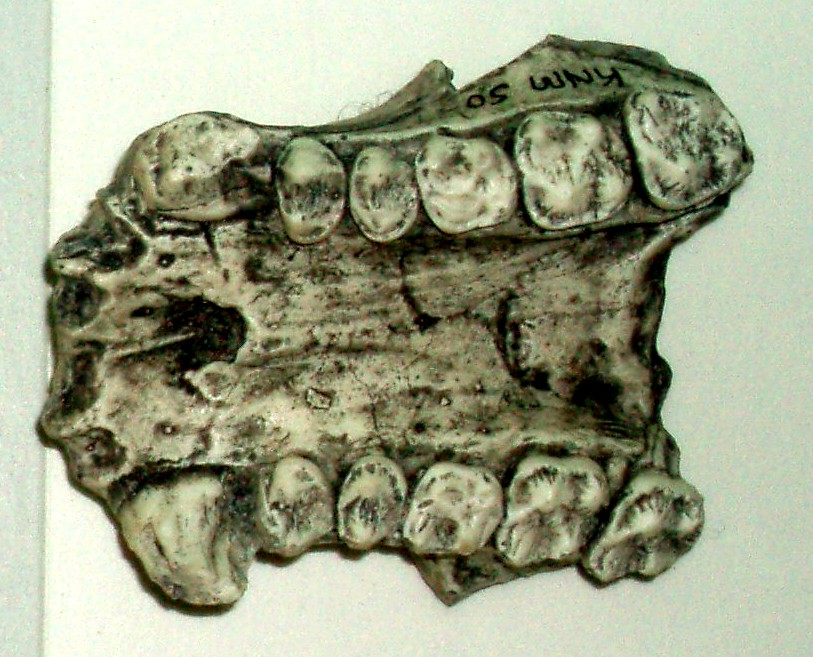
  Rangwapithecus gordoni jaw

- Mabokopithecus clarki von Koenigswald, 1969

- Oreopithecus Gervais, 1872

- Oreopithecus bamboli Gervais, 1872

- Rukwapithecus Stevens et al., 2013

- Rukwapithecus fleaglei Stevens et al., 2013

- Rangwapithecus Andrews, 1974

- Rangwapithecus gordoni Andrews, 1974

- Turkanapithecus Leakey & Leakey, 1986

- Turkanapithecus kalakolensis Leakey & Leakey, 1986

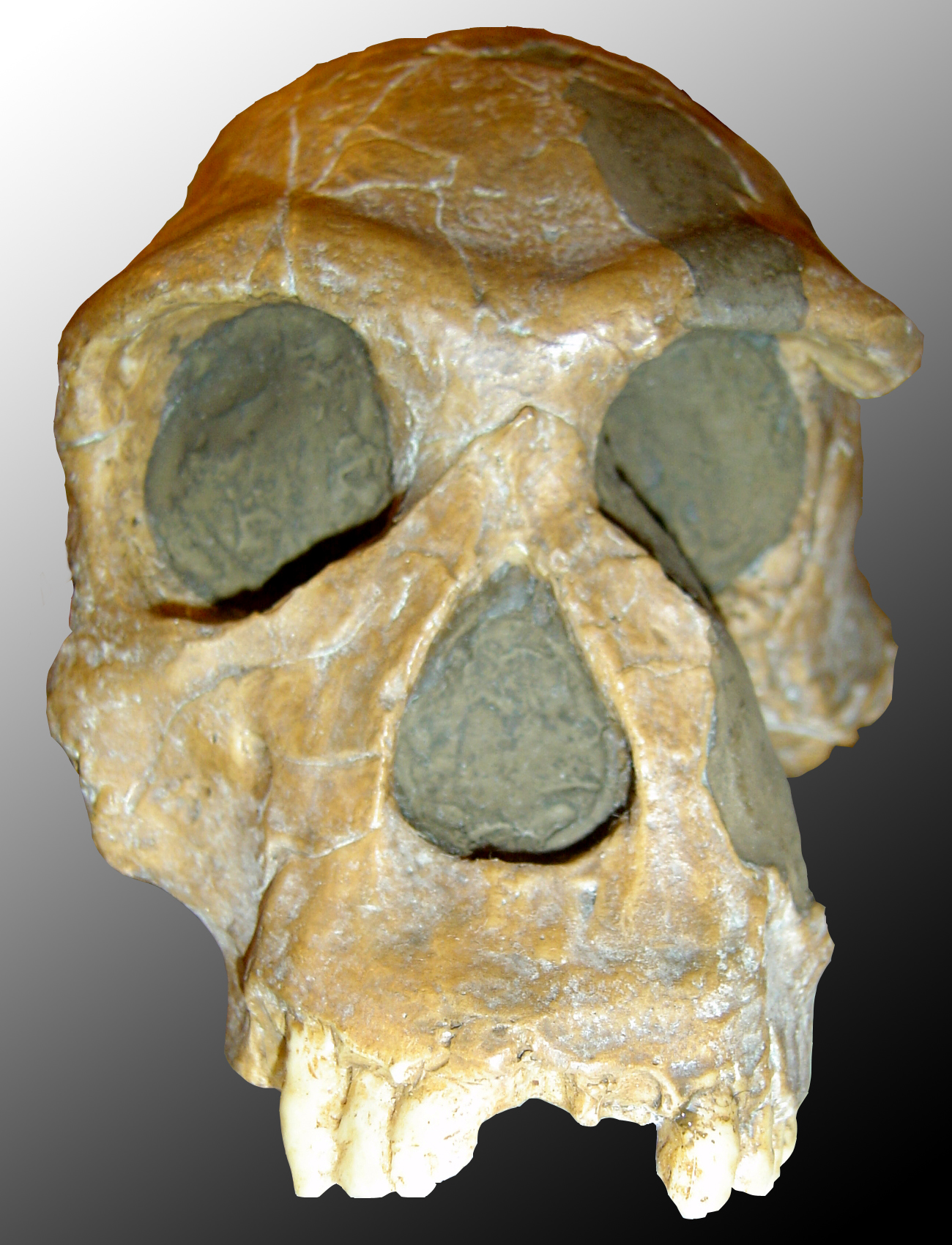
Homo habilis

- Pliobatidae Alba et al., 2015
  - Pliobates Alba et al., 2015
    - Pliobates cataloniae Alba et al., 2015
- Afropithecidae Begun, 2002
  - Griphopithecinae Begun, 2002
    - Griphopithecus Abel, 1902
      - Griphopithecus alpani Tekkaya, 1974
      - Griphopithecus suessi Abel, 1902
  - Afropithecinae Andrews, 1992
    - Afropithecus Leakey & Leakey, 1986
      - Afropithecus turkanensis Leakey & Leakey, 1986
    - Heliopithecus Andrews & Martin, 1987
      - Heliopithecus leakeyi Andrews & Martin, 1987
    - Nacholapithecus Ishida et al., 1999
      - Nacholapithecus kerioi Ishida et al., 1999
    - Equatorius Ward et al., 1999
      - Equatorius africanus (Le Gros Clark and Leaky, 1950)
- Hominidae Gray, 1825
  - Kenyapithecinae Leakey, 1962
    - Kenyapithecus Leakey, 1962
      - Kenyapithecus wickeri Leakey, 1962
  - Ponginae Elliot, 1913
    - Sivapithecini
      - Sivapithecus Pilgrim, 1910
        - Sivapithecus indicus Pilgrim, 1910
        - Sivapithecus parvada Kelley, 1988
        - Sivapithecus sivalensis Lydekker, 1879
      - Gigantopithecus von Koenigswald, 1935
        - Gigantopithecus blacki von Koenigswald, 1935
        - Gigantopithecus giganteus Pilgrim, 1915
      - Ankarapithecus Ozansoy, 1965
        - Ankarapithecus meteai Ozansoy, 1965
    - Lufengpithecini
      - Lufengpithecus Wu, 1987
        - Lufengpithecus chiangmuanensis Chaimanee et al., 2003
        - Lufengpithecus hudiensis Zhang et al., 1987
        - Lufengpithecus keiyuanensis Woo, 1957
        - Lufengpithecus lufengensis Xu et al., 1978
    - Homininae Gray, 1825
      - Dryopithecini Gregory & Hellman, 1939
        - Ouranopithecus Bonis & Melentis, 1977
          - Ouranopithecus macedoniensis Bonis & Melentis, 1977
        - Rudapithecus Kretzoi, 1969
          - Rudapithecus hungaricus Kretzoi, 1969
        - Hispanopithecus Villalta & Crusafont, 1944
          - Hispanopithecus laietanus Villalta & Crusafont, 1944
          - Hispanopithecus crusafonti (Begun, 1992)
        - Pierolapithecus Moyà-Solà, 2004
          - Pierolapithecus catalaunicus Moyà-Solà, 2004
        - Anoiapithecus Moyà-Solà et al., 2009
          - Anoiapithecus brevirostris Moyà-Solà et al., 2009
        - Dryopithecus Lartet, 1856
          - Dryopithecus wuduensis Xue & Delson, 1988
          - Dryopithecus fontani Lartet, 1856
        - Nakalipithecus Kunimatsu et al. 2007
          - Nakalipthecus nakayamai Kunimatsu et al. 2007
        - Neopithecus Abel, 1902
          - Neopithecus brancoi (Schlosser, 1901)
      - Gorillini
        - Samburupithecus Ishida & Pickford, 1997
          - Samburupithecus kiptalami Ishida & Pickford, 1997
        - Chororapithecus Suwa et al., 2007
          - Chororapithecus abyssinicus Suwa et al., 2007
      - Hominini
        - Graecopithecus von Koenigswald, 1972
          - Graecopithecus freybergi von Koenigswald, 1972
        - Sahelanthropus Brunet et al., 2002
          - Sahelanthropus tchadensis Brunet et al., 2002
        - Orrorin Senut et al., 2001
          - Orrorin tugenensis Senut et al., 2001
        - Ardipithecus White et al., 1995
          - Ardipithecus ramidus White et al., 1994
          - Ardipithecus kadabba
        - Australopithecus Dart, 1925 - paraphyletic in respect to Paranthropus and Homo
          - Australopithecus anamensis Leakey et al., 1995
          - Australopithecus afarensis Johanson et al., 1978
          - Australopithecus bahrelghazali Brunet et al., 1995
          - Australopithecus africanus Dart, 1925
          - Australopithecus garhi Asfaw et al., 1999
          - Australopithecus sedibaBerger et al., 2010
        - Paranthropus Broom, 1938
          - Paranthropus aethiopicus Arambourg & Coppens, 1968
          - Paranthropus boisei Leakey, 1959
          - Paranthropus robustus Broom, 1938
        - Homo Linnaeus, 1758
          - Homo gautengensis Curnoe, 2010
          - Homo rudolfensis Alexeev, 1986
          - Homo habilis Leakey et al., 1964
          - Homo luzonensis Détroit et al., 2019
          - Homo erectus Dubois, 1892
          - Homo floresiensis P. Brown et al., 2004
          - Homo ergaster Groves & Mazak, 1975
          - Homo antecessor Bermúdez de Castro et al., 1997
          - Homo heidelbergensis Schoetensack, 1908
          - Homo cepranensis Mallegni et al., 2003
          - Homo neanderthalensis King, 1864
          - Homo rhodesiensis Woodward, 1921
          - Homo naledi Berger et al., 2015
        - Kenyanthropus Leakey et al., 2001
          - Kenyanthropus platyops Leakey et al., 2001

== See also ==
- Evolution of primates
- List of fossil primates of South America
- List of fossil sites
- List of human evolution fossils
- List of prehistoric mammals
- Prehistoric Autopsy (2012 BBC documentary)
