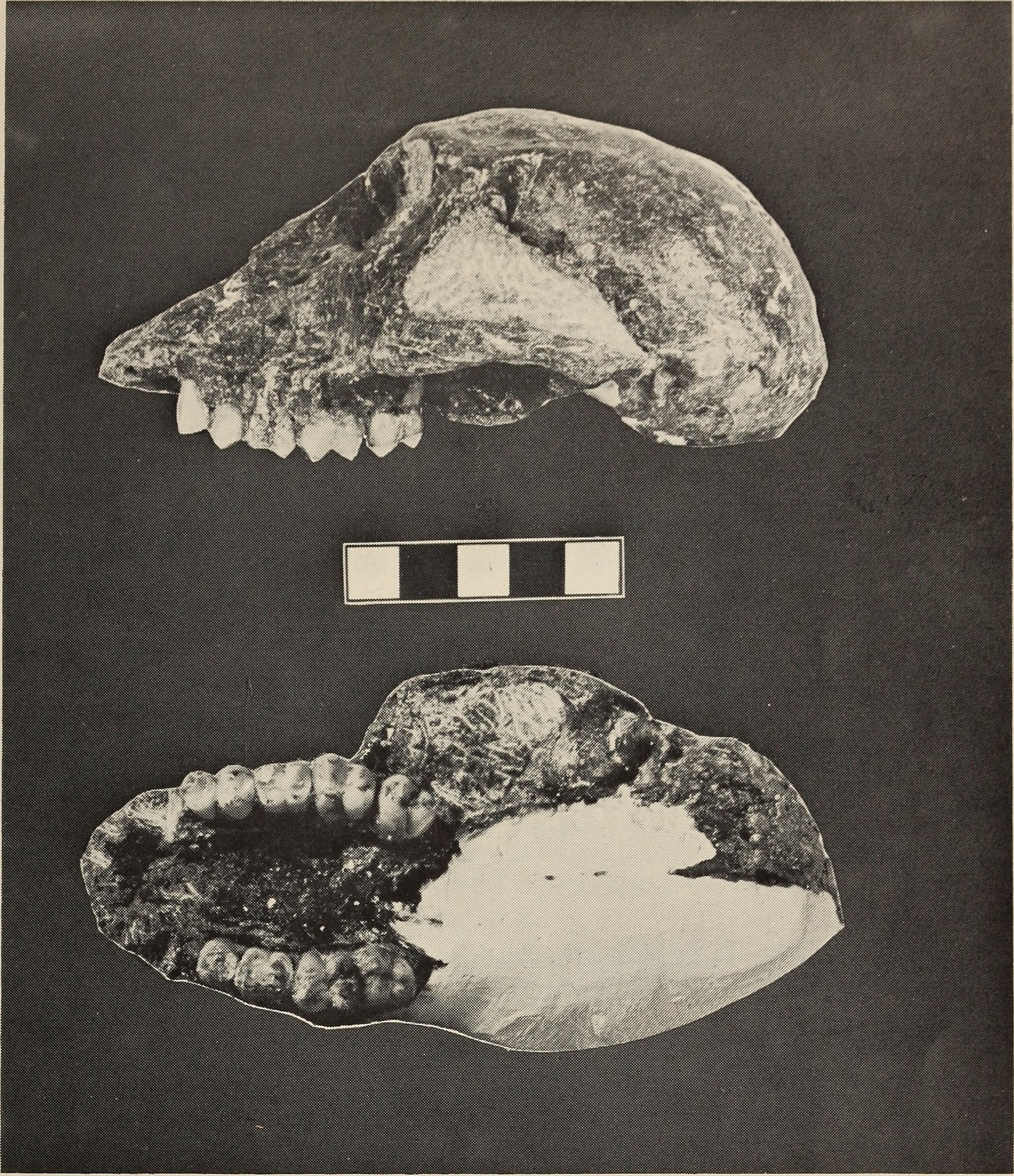
- Female Procercocebus antiquus M.3078, lateral and basal view

Scientific classification
- Kingdom: Animalia
- Phylum: Chordata
- Class: Mammalia
- Infraclass: Placentalia
- Order: Primates
- Family: Cercopithecidae
- Tribe: Papionini
- Genus: †Procercocebus; Gilbert, 2007

Type species
- †Procercocebus antiquus Haughton, 1925

Synonyms
- Papio antiquus Haughton, 1925 Papio africanus Gear, 1926 Parapapio antiquus Broom, 1940 Parapapio africanus Freedman, 1957

= Procercocebus =

Procercocebus Temporal range: Late Pliocene to Pleistocene, 2.8–2.3 Ma

Extinct genus of Old World monkeys

Procercocebus is an extinct genus of papionin cercopithecid from Pliocene and Pleistocene South Africa.

== Taxonomy ==
Procercocebus is considered part of a monophyletic clade including the extant Cercocebus and Mandrillus; the white-eyelid mangabeys and the mandrills/drills respectively, as well as the extinct Soromandrillus. A direct ancestral relationship between Procerocebus and Cercocebus has been suggested on the grounds of anatomical similarity.

Procercocebus was originally considered a species of Papio (baboons), and then Parapapio, Parapapio antiquus.

== Description ==
Procercocebus is generally considered small to medium sized, weighing about 10–20 kg (22–44 lb) and is distinguished from other papionines by a suite of cranial and dental characteristics.

=== Crania ===
==== Skull ====
The cranium of Procercocebus is smaller and narrower than other papionines, and has a straight nasal profile. The nuchal crests are upturned and the temporal lines are divergent. Before the orbits there is no anteorbital drop, a trait seen in other papionines. Procercocebus has maxillary ridges that are prominent, though not as prominent as in Mandrillus. The maxilla is also dotted with maxillary fossae that extend up to and partially into the infraorbital plate. Sexual dimorphism within Procercocebus has been observed, with females having less upturned nuchal crests and less divergent temporal lines.

==== Dentition ====
The most defining trait of Procercocebus is their enlarged mandibular premolars. The distal loph of the third molar is reduced, and the molars flare less than in Mandrillus.

== Paleoecology ==
=== Distribution ===
Known from the same locality as the famous Taung Child, it has been suggested that Procercocebus was hunted by a large bird of prey. Within the Taung locality, Procercocebus is the most common fossil primate. Procercocebus serves as evidence that the lineage containing Cercocebus had inhabited the southern portions of Africa, which then promptly disappeared around 2 million years ago. Suggested hypotheses for the extinction of the Cercocebus lineage in South Africa include competition from Papio species and climate change resulting in more arid conditions.

=== Paleobiology ===
Procercocebus likely ate hard foods, as indicated by its large premolars. Due to the sheer amount of Procercocebus fossils in the Taung locality, it has been suggested that P. antiquus was the preferred prey item of a raptor similar to the African crowned eagle (Stephanoaetus coronatus).
