= M. libyca =

M. libyca may refer to:

- Macaca libyca, a prehistoric monkey species
- Mawsonia libyca, an extinct fish species
