= Pliopapio =

Pliopapio Temporal range: Pliocene

Scientific classification
- Domain: Eukaryota
- Kingdom: Animalia
- Phylum: Chordata
- Class: Mammalia
- Order: Primates
- Suborder: Haplorhini
- Infraorder: Simiiformes
- Family: Cercopithecidae
- Tribe: Papionini
- Genus: †Pliopapio; Frost, 2001
- Species: †P. alemui

Binomial name
- †Pliopapio alemui Frost, 2001

Extinct genus of Old World monkeys

Pliopapio is an extinct genus of Old World monkey known from the latest part of the Miocene to the early Pliocene Epochs from the Afar Region of Ethiopia. It was first described based on a very large series of fossils from the site of Aramis in the Middle Awash, which has been dated by ^{40}Ar/^{39}Ar to 4.4 million years old. It has since been found from similarly aged sediments at Gona, approximately 75 km to the North. Additional fossils from the Middle Awash extend its known time range back to at least 5.3 million years ago. There is only one known species, Pliopapio alemui.

== Description ==
In most ways, Pliopapio is similar other generalized members of the tribe Papionini, such as the living macaques, mangabeys, and baboons. In overall size, P. alemui was close to the larger macaques and smaller baboons. Based on dental measurements, females are estimated to have averaged 8.5 kg in body weight and males approximately 12 kg. This suggests only a modest level of sexual dimorphism in body size.

Pliopapio possessed a relatively elongate and narrow muzzle and a brain case that lacked superstructures such as sagittal or nuchal crests. Dentally, it is similar to most papionin monkeys, but the molar teeth are somewhat narrower and taller. A few limb fragments have been tentatively allocated to P. alemui. They suggest it was a semi-terrestrial quadrupedal monkey that was more adapted to arboreal locomotion than baboons, but less than crested mangabeys.

== Diet ==
The dentition suggests it had an opportunistic and omnivorous diet similar to many living papionin monkeys. Analysis of the chewing surfaces of the molar teeth found microwear consistent with a diet of fruits and or leaves, and of softer food items in particular. Carbon isotopes from tooth enamel reflect incorporation of more savanna-based foods (i.e. C4/CAM ) than Kuseracolobus aramisi a colobine monkey, but fewer than the human ancestor Ardipithecus ramidus at Aramis. Carbon isotopic analysis of P. alemui tooth enamel from Gona showed similar results. From Aramis, analysis of oxygen isotopes may suggest more fruit than leaves, whereas at Gona, enamel oxygen isotopes suggest more access to open water.
