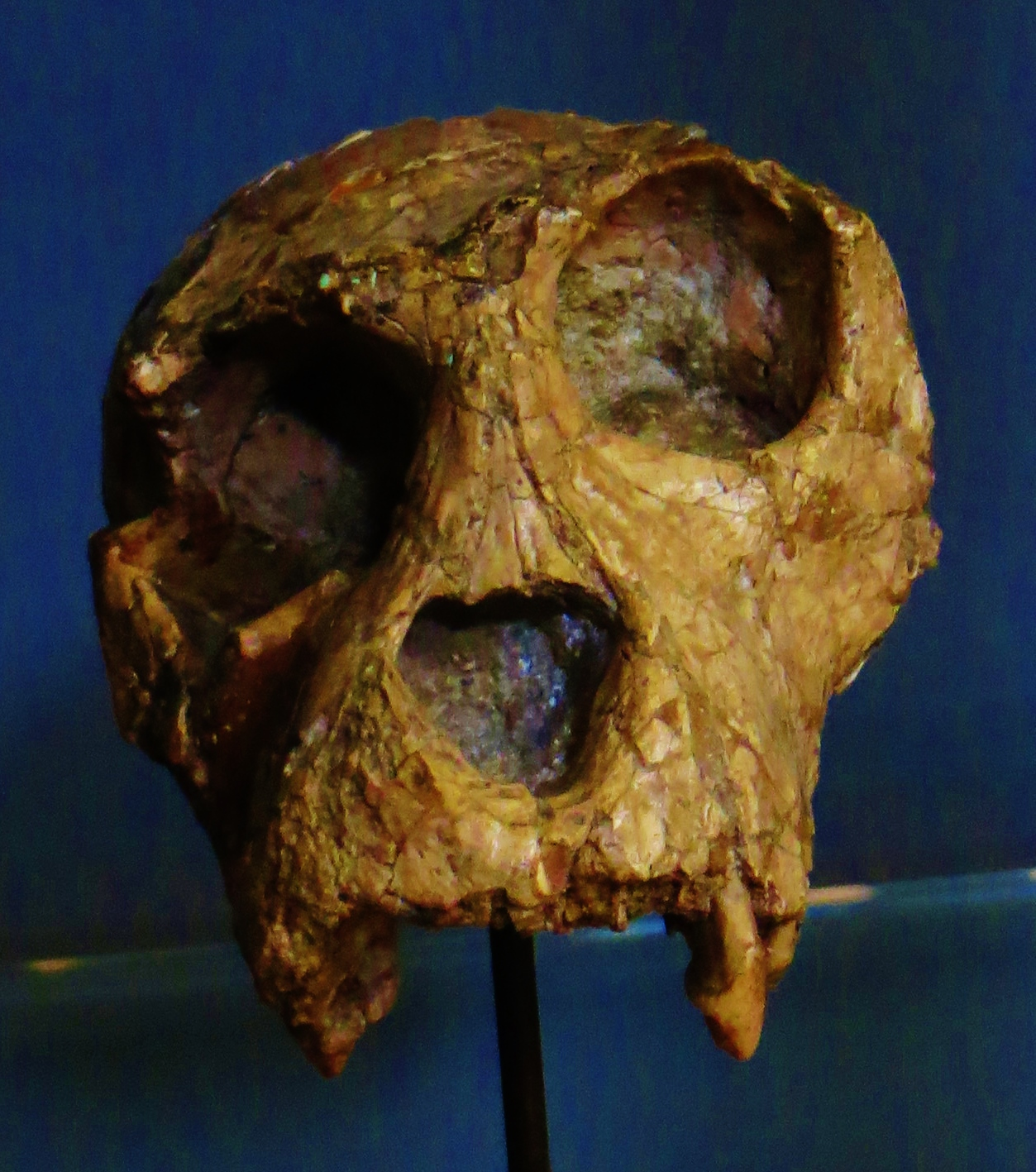
- Skull of Dolichopithecus ruscinensis at the Gallery of Paleontology and Comparative Anatomy, Paris.

Scientific classification
- Kingdom: Animalia
- Phylum: Chordata
- Class: Mammalia
- Order: Primates
- Suborder: Haplorhini
- Infraorder: Simiiformes
- Family: Cercopithecidae
- Subfamily: Colobinae
- Genus: †Dolichopithecus; Dépéret, 1889

Type species
- †Dolichopithecus ruscinensis Dépéret, 1889

Species
- D. balcanicus; D. ruscinensis

= Dolichopithecus =

Dolichopithecus Temporal range: Late Miocene - Mid Pliocene

Extinct genus of Old World monkeys

Dolichopithecus is an extinct genus of Old World monkey that lived in Europe during the Late Miocene and Pliocene.

== Taxonomy ==
The type species Dolichopithecus ruscinensis was first described in 1889 by Charles Depéret, based on fossil remains from the Roussillon area in France dating back to the Middle Pliocene. Numerous fossils of D. ruscinensis have been found in European Pliocene deposits from France, Spain, Bulgaria, Hungary, Romania, and Ukraine. A second species, D. balcanicus, has been described from remains found in the Balkans.

Some extinct colobine species from Asia have formerly been included in Dolichopithecus; D. leptopostorbitalis of Japan, now placed in Kanagawapithecus, and D. eohanuman from northeast Asia, now in Parapresbytis. Paradolichopithecus arvernensis was also originally included under this genus, but is more related to macaques rather than colobines.

Dolichopithecus is believed to be closely related to Mesopithecus and the two form an early grouping of Eurasian colobines. The teeth are very similar, although Dolichopithecus has a larger size, longer skull and more terrestrial adaptations than Mesopithecus.

== Description ==
Dolichopithecus was a rather large monkey with estimated weights of 20–30 kg (44–66 lb) for males and 12–18 kg (26–40 lb) for females; as in most monkeys the male would have been significantly larger than the female.

Dolichopithecus had a rather long skull with very large canines in the male, and many postcranial elements match those of ground-dwelling monkeys such as baboons more than they do to it close colobine relatives. This includes short, stout phalanges and joint articulations similar to those of baboons. The environment it would have lived in was forested, so it can be assumed that Dolichopithecus would have roamed the forest floors.
