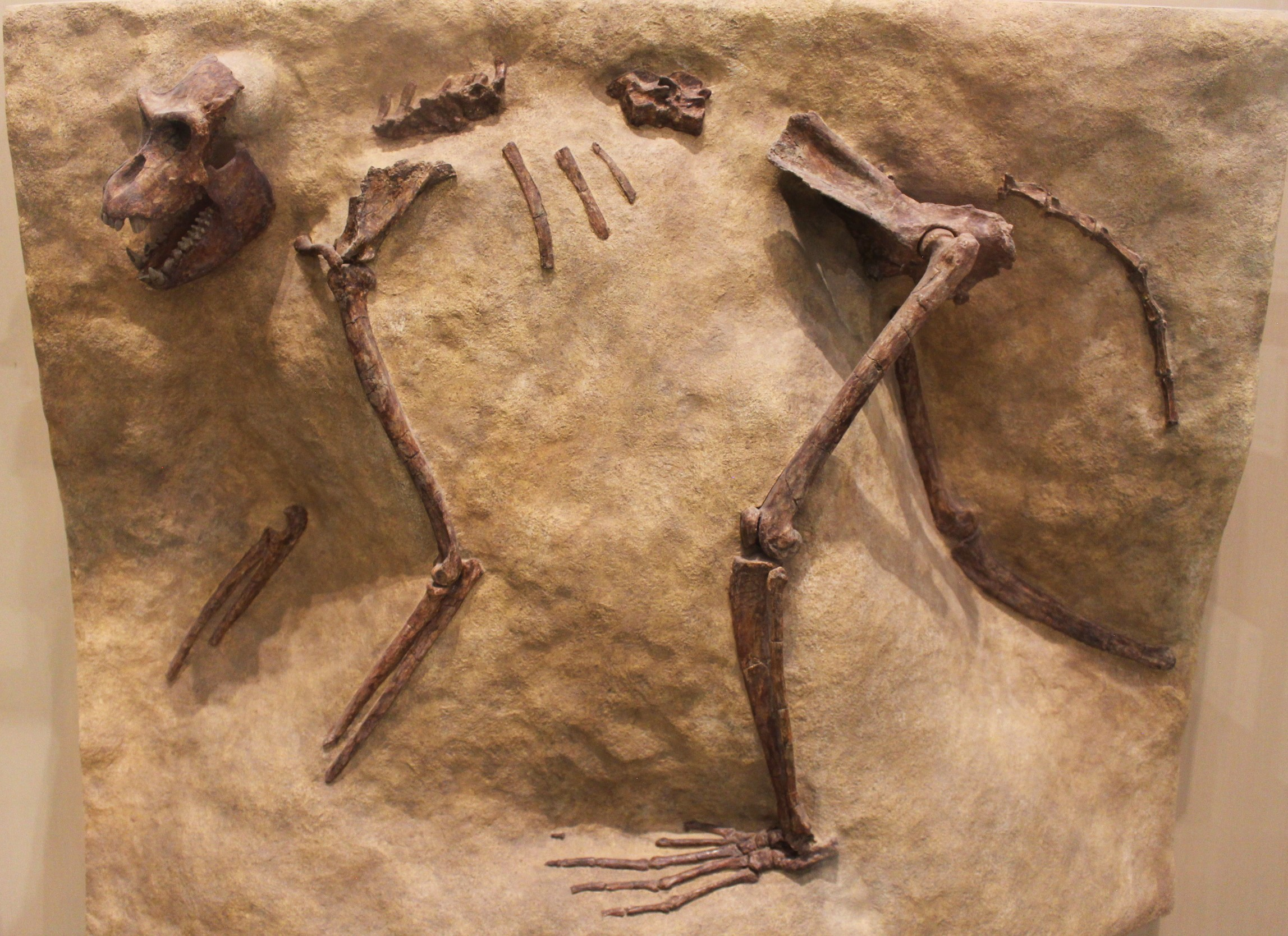
- Holotype specimen of P. chemeroni (AMNH 129319)

Scientific classification
- Kingdom: Animalia
- Phylum: Chordata
- Class: Mammalia
- Order: Primates
- Suborder: Haplorhini
- Family: Cercopithecidae
- Subfamily: Colobinae
- Genus: †Paracolobus; R.E.F. Leakey, 1969

Type species
- †Paracolobus chemeroni Leakey, 1969

Species
- †Paracolobus chemeroni; †Paracolobus enkorikae; †Paracolobus mutiwa

= Paracolobus =

Paracolobus Temporal range: Pliocene–Early Pleistocene

Extinct genus of Old World monkeys

Paracolobus is an extinct genus of primate closely related to the living colobus monkeys. It lived in eastern Africa in the Pliocene and Early Pleistocene. Fossils have been found in Kenya and Ethiopia, in places such as the Omo valley.

== Description ==
Species of Paracolobus were large monkeys; P. chemeroni is estimated to have weighed between 30–50 kg (66–110 lb), while P. mutiwa and the comparatively small P. enkorikae have been estimated at 39 kg (86 lb) and 9 kg (20 lb), respectively. Compared to another giant monkey Cercopithecoides, Paracolobus had a longer face and deeper jaws. It had a longer cranium, broader muzzle, wider face and longer nasal bone than its closest relative, the extinct Rhinocolobus. Its dentition was similar to modern colobus monkeys, indicating a largely folivorous diet. Despite its large size, it was probably arboreal like its modern relatives.

== Literature cited ==
- McKenna, M.C. and Bell, S.K. 1997. Classification of Mammals: Above the species level. New York: Columbia University Press, 631 pp. ISBN 0-231-11013-8
