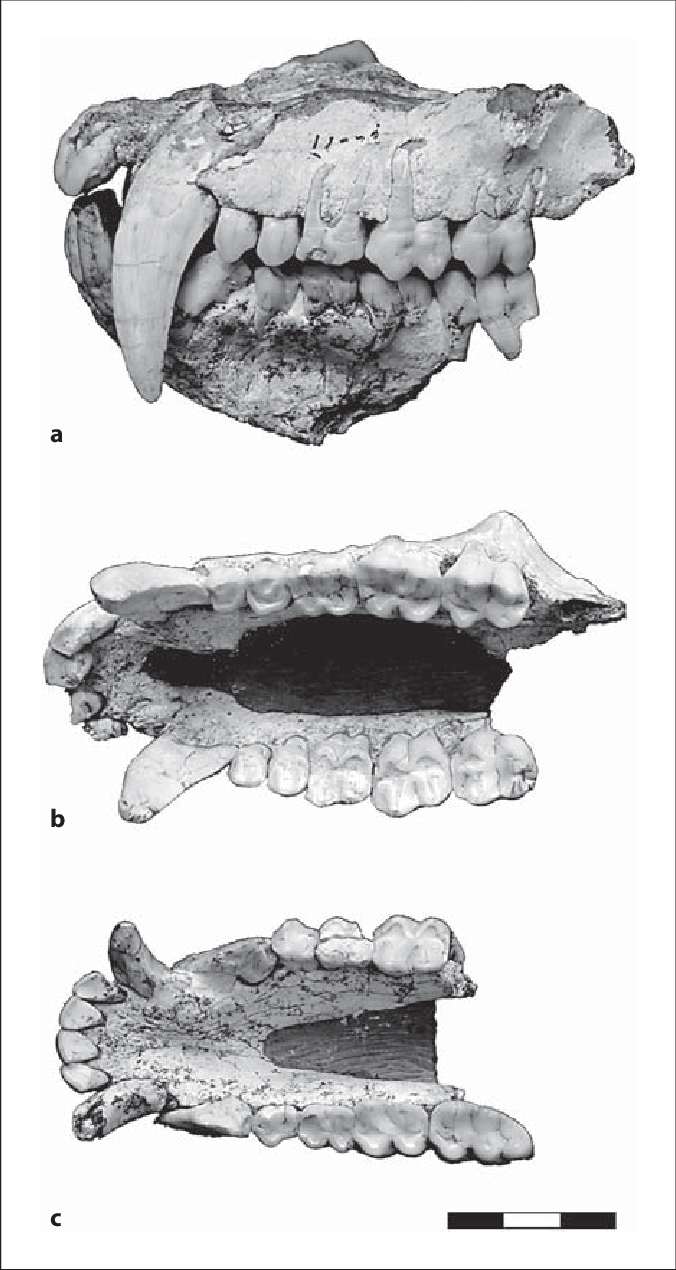

Scientific classification
- Kingdom: Animalia
- Phylum: Chordata
- Class: Mammalia
- Infraclass: Placentalia
- Order: Primates
- Family: Cercopithecidae
- Subfamily: Cercopithecinae
- Tribe: Papionini
- Genus: †Paradolichopithecus; Necrasov, Samson & Radulesco, 1961

Type species
- †Paradolichopithecus arvernensis (Depéret, 1929)

Species
- †P. gansuensis †P. sushkini

= Paradolichopithecus =

Paradolichopithecus Temporal range: Pliocene-Early Pleistocene

Extinct genus of Old World monkeys

Paradolichopithecus is an extinct genus of cercopithecine monkey once found throughout Eurasia. The type species, P. arvernensis, was a very large monkey, comparable in size to a mandrill. The genus was most closely related to macaques, sharing a very similar cranial morphology. The fossils attributed to Paradolichopithecus are known from the Early Pliocene to the Early Pleistocene of Europe (France, Spain, Greece, Romania, and Serbia) and Asia (Tajikistan and China). The East Asian fossil genus Procynocephalus is considered by some to represent a senior synonym of Paradolichopithecus.

== Description ==
Paradolichopithecus was a terrestrial monkey generally believed to have developed a large body size as a response to predator pressure, estimated to be similar in weight to the mandrill (~31 kg). Despite its close relation to macaques, it also shared a number of postcranial features with baboons. Its ankle joints also show a remarkable similarity with that of the hominid Australopithecus, and it has led to the idea that Paradolichopithecus may frequently have moved in a bipedal stance. The limbs of this genus were robust with prominent areas of muscular attachment, notably found on the humerus which had a length of 22.5 cm. The radius of this specimen was longer than the humerus as seen in the mandrill, measuring 25.2 cm, although it was also broader in structure than current mandrills and baboons.

A fossil of this primate shows the talus bone having features much more alike australopithecines than modern baboons or chimpanzees, such as shape and placement, although some features are similar to bipedally trained Japanese macaques. The distal tibia found also has a distinctly more massive and square malleolus, differing from macaques or baboons and again showing a similarity to hominins. The morphology and width of the tibia shows that this primate had specific weight-bearing adaptations for terrestrial locomotion. The proximal humerus found in this site has a deep and wide attachment groove for the biceps along with a larger articulation area on the head, which relates to the increased mobility possible for the elbow joint found.

The morphology of the inner ear of Paradolichopithecus as revealed by micro-CT scans is consistent with its placement as a basal member of Papionini or to a basal member of the crown group Papionina.

== Palaeobiology ==
=== Palaeoecology ===
The dental microwear patterns of P. arvernensis resemble those of Australopithecus africanus, strongly suggesting it was a terrestrial forager.
