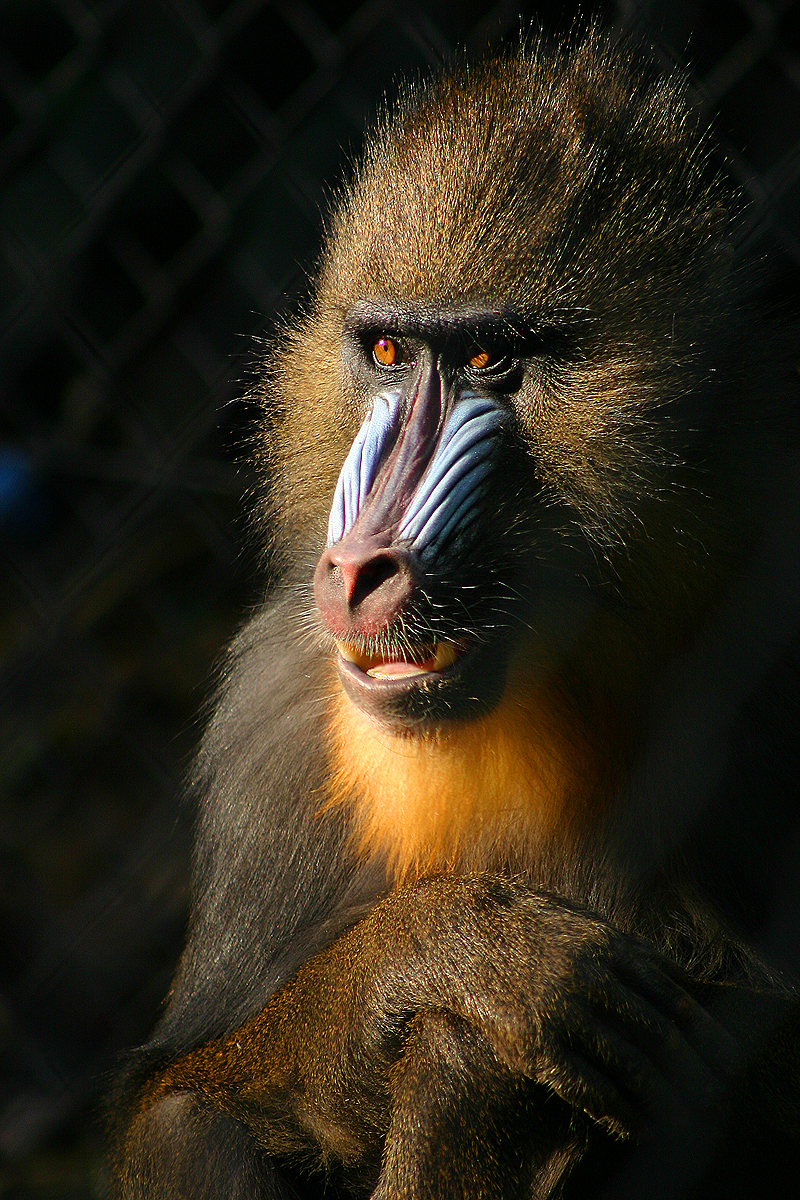
- Mandrill (Mandrillus sphinx) in Germany

Scientific classification
- Kingdom: Animalia
- Phylum: Chordata
- Class: Mammalia
- Order: Primates
- Suborder: Haplorhini
- Infraorder: Simiiformes
- Family: Cercopithecidae
- Subfamily: Cercopithecinae
- Tribe: Papionini; Burnett, 1828

Type genus
- Papio Erxleben, 1777

Genera
- See text

= Papionini =

Papionini Temporal range: Pliocene to present

Tribe of Old World monkeys

Papionini is a tribe of Old World monkeys that includes several large monkey species, which include the macaques of North Africa and Asia, as well as the baboons, geladas, mangabeys, kipunji, drills, and mandrills, which are essentially from sub-Saharan Africa (although some baboons also occur in southern Arabia). It is typically divided into two subtribes: Macacina for the genus Macaca and its extinct relatives and the Papionina for all other genera.

== Evolution and fossil record ==
Papionin fossils are extensively known from the Pliocene and Pleistocene of East Africa.

== Classification ==
- Family Cercopithecidae
  - Subfamily Cercopithecinae
    - Tribe Cercopithecini
    - Tribe Papionini
      - Genus Macaca – macaques
      - Genus Lophocebus – crested mangabeys
      - Genus Rungwecebus – highland mangabey (kipunji)
      - Genus Papio – baboons
      - Genus Theropithecus – gelada
      - Genus Cercocebus – white-eyelid mangabeys
      - Genus Mandrillus – drill and mandrill
    - Fossil genera
      - Genus Dinopithecus
      - Genus Gorgopithecus
      - Genus Paradolichopithecus
      - Genus Parapapio
      - Genus Pliopapio
      - Genus Procercocebus
      - Genus Procynocephalus
      - Genus Soromandrillus
