= Soromandrillus =

Scientific classification
- Kingdom: Animalia
- Phylum: Chordata
- Class: Mammalia
- Order: Primates
- Family: Cercopithecidae
- Subfamily: Cercopithecinae
- Tribe: Papionini
- Genus: †Soromandrillus; Gilbert, 2013

Extinct genus of primates

Soromandrillus ("Sister Mandrill") is an extinct genus of cercopithecoid monkey from southern Africa. The only known species is S. quadratirostris, formerly recognised as a species of Dinopithecus.

== History ==
In 2013, Christopher Gilbert named Soromandrillus as a separate genus.
