= Gorgopithecus =

Gorgopithecus Temporal range: Pliocene - Early Pleistocene

Scientific classification
- Kingdom: Animalia
- Phylum: Chordata
- Class: Mammalia
- Order: Primates
- Suborder: Haplorhini
- Family: Cercopithecidae
- Tribe: Papionini
- Genus: †Gorgopithecus; Broom & Robinson, 1949
- Species: †G. major

Binomial name
- †Gorgopithecus major Broom, 1940

Extinct genus of monkeys

Gorgopithecus is an extinct genus of primate in the Old World monkey family Cercopithecidae, closely related to the baboons. There is only one known species, Gorgopithecus major. It has been found at sites from the Pliocene and Early Pleistocene Epoch in South Africa and Tanzania. It was first discovered at the Kromdraai A (also called the Kromdraai "Faunal") site in South Africa. It has since been found from Swartkrans (member 1), South Africa. Most recently, it has been recognized from the DKI site in Bed I of Olduvai Gorge, Tanzania, which has been dated to 1.8 million years old.

== Description ==
Gorgopithecus major was somewhat larger in body size than the largest extant baboons, with males estimated to have weighed approximately 37 kg on average, based on dental size. Like most other papionin (baboons and their close relatives) monkeys, it had a large degree of sexual dimorphism where males are much larger than females and have large, fang-like, canine teeth. Like other baboons, it has a long snout, but is distinguished from other papionin monkeys by the presence of deeply excavated fossae on the sides of its snout (postcanine fossae), absence of maxillary ridges (crests of bone along the length of the snout), and short nasal bones.

== Paleoecology ==
The diet of Gorgopithecus was probably similar in many ways to that of living baboons and macaques, which are mostly opportunistic feeders with an omnivorous diet dominated by fruit, roots, tubers, grass seeds, gums, soft leaves, but also occasional insects and other animal foods. The morphology of the molar teeth suggest it ate mostly fruits and other easily digested plant parts. Microwear analysis of teeth from Kromdraai, South Africa was consistent with leaf eating, but samples were too small for statistical analysis. To date, no limb bones or other elements of the postcranial skeleton have been attributed to G. major so its manner of locomotion and whether it preferred life in the trees or on the ground is unknown.
