= Macaca anderssoni =

Macaca anderssoni Temporal range: Pleistocene

Scientific classification
- Domain: Eukaryota
- Kingdom: Animalia
- Phylum: Chordata
- Class: Mammalia
- Order: Primates
- Suborder: Haplorhini
- Infraorder: Simiiformes
- Family: Cercopithecidae
- Genus: Macaca
- Species: M. anderssoni

Binomial name
- Macaca anderssoni Schlosser, 1924

Extinct species of monkey

Macaca anderssoni is a prehistoric species of macaque from the Pleistocene of China. It weighed between 7.5 kilograms (17 lb) and 10.5 kilograms (23 lb). This species has a unique nasal cavity morphology that is laterally expanded anteriorly and constricted posteriorly. This morphology is not found in other macaque species, except for some of the larger members of the Sinica group.
