= Libypithecus =

Libypithecus Temporal range: Late Miocene

Scientific classification
- Kingdom: Animalia
- Phylum: Chordata
- Class: Mammalia
- Order: Primates
- Suborder: Haplorhini
- Family: Cercopithecidae
- Subfamily: incertae sedis
- Genus: †Libypithecus; Stromer, 1913

Type species
- †Libypithecus markgrafi Stromer, 1913

Extinct single-species genus of primates

Libypithecus markgrafi is an extinct species of primate that lived in the Late Miocene. It is the only species described in the genus Libypithecus.
