= Cantius frugivorus =

Cantius frugivorus Temporal range: Early Eocene (Wasatchian) ~55.8–50.3 Ma

Scientific classification
- Kingdom: Animalia
- Phylum: Chordata
- Class: Mammalia
- Order: Primates
- Suborder: Strepsirrhini
- Family: †Notharctidae
- Genus: †Cantius
- Species: †C. frugivorus

Binomial name
- †Cantius frugivorus Cope, 1875

Extinct species of primate

Cantius frugivorus is a species of adapiform primate that lived in North America during the early Eocene.

== Morphology ==
This species had a dental formula of 2.1.4.32.1.4.3. The incisors are small and vertical in Cantius frugivorus, and the canines are prominent. The mandibular symphysis is unfused and this was most likely a diurnal species. Cantius frugivorus had an average body mass of around 2.8 kg (6.2 lb).

== Diet ==
Based on the dental morphology of Cantius frugivorus, it most likely had a frugivorous diet.

== Locomotion ==
The limb bones of Cantius frugivorus suggest it moved by arboreal quadrupedalism and leaping.
