= Rhinocolobus =

Rhinocolobus Temporal range: Pliocene - Early Pleistocene 3.4–1.5 Ma

Scientific classification
- Kingdom: Animalia
- Phylum: Chordata
- Class: Mammalia
- Order: Primates
- Family: Cercopithecidae
- Subfamily: Colobinae
- Genus: †Rhinocolobus; Leakey, 1982
- Species: †R. turkanaensis

Binomial name
- †Rhinocolobus turkanaensis Leakey, 1982

Extinct genus of Old World monkeys

Rhinocolobus is an extinct genus of monkey closely related to modern colobus monkeys. It lived in eastern Africa during the Plio-Pleistocene, existing as recently as 1.5 million years ago.

== Taxonomy ==
Fossils of Rhinocolobus were found in Shungura Formation and Usno formation surrounding the Omo river valley and the Hadar formation surrounding the Afar depression in Ethiopia. It has been closely allied with living colobus monkeys as well as the extinct Paracolobus.

== Description ==
Rhinocolobus was larger than any living colobus monkey, and also displayed sexual dimorphism. Fossils of males have been estimated to weigh 31 kg (68 lb), while females have been estimated at only 17 kg (37 lb). It had a fairly long muzzle, and a nearly absent nasal bone, comparable to Asian snub-nosed monkeys. Compared to its modern relatives, it would have had a noticeably short nose. However, postcranial elements are nearly indistinguishable from the corresponding bones of living colobus monkeys outside of size, which suggests that it was a mostly arboreal, folivorous species in spite of its greater size.
