= Macaca jiangchuanensis =

Macaca jiangchuanensis Temporal range: Early Pleistocene

Scientific classification
- Kingdom: Animalia
- Phylum: Chordata
- Class: Mammalia
- Order: Primates
- Suborder: Haplorhini
- Family: Cercopithecidae
- Genus: Macaca
- Species: M. jiangchuanensis

Binomial name
- Macaca jiangchuanensis Pan et al., 1992

Extinct species of monkey

Macaca jiangchuanensis is a prehistoric macaque from the early Pleistocene of China.
