= Parapresbytis =

Parapresbytis Temporal range: Pliocene

Scientific classification
- Domain: Eukaryota
- Kingdom: Animalia
- Phylum: Chordata
- Class: Mammalia
- Order: Primates
- Suborder: Haplorhini
- Infraorder: Simiiformes
- Family: Cercopithecidae
- Subfamily: Colobinae
- Genus: †Parapresbytis; Kalmykov & Maschenco, 1992
- Species: †P. eohanuman

Binomial name
- †Parapresbytis eohanuman Borissoglebskaya, 1981

Extinct genus of Old World monkeys

Parapresbytis is an extinct genus of colobine monkey that lived in northeast Asia during the Mid-Late Pliocene. It is represented by single species known as Parapresbytis eohanuman, whose remains have been found throughout the Transbaikal area.

== Taxonomy ==
Parapresbytis eohanuman was once considered a species of Dolichopithecus, but was found to be distinct. There is debate as to its exact position within Colobinae, with some researchers considering it an ancestor to certain Asian colobines such as snub-nosed monkeys, and others considering it a member of a primitive colobine radiation that includes Dolichopithecus and left no descendants. Parapresbytis seems to display a mosaic of distinct features shared with different living Asian colobine species, making its placement uncertain.

== Description ==
Parapresbytis was a large monkey, with an ulnar comparable in size to a chacma baboon. It has been estimated to weigh in at over 30 kg (66 lb). Despite its size, the elbow morphology of Parapresbytis indicates that it was a climber and thus it can be assumed that it lived a mostly arboreal lifestyle. This matches well with the palaeoclimate of Pliocene northeast Asia, which at the time when Parapresbytis was living, would have been covered in warm forests.
