= Macaca libyca =

Macaca libyca Temporal range: Miocene

Scientific classification
- Domain: Eukaryota
- Kingdom: Animalia
- Phylum: Chordata
- Class: Mammalia
- Order: Primates
- Suborder: Haplorhini
- Infraorder: Simiiformes
- Family: Cercopithecidae
- Genus: Macaca
- Species: M. libyca

Binomial name
- Macaca libyca Stromer, 1920

Extinct species of Old World monkey

Macaca libyca is a prehistoric macaque from the Late Miocene of Wadi Natrun, Egypt.
