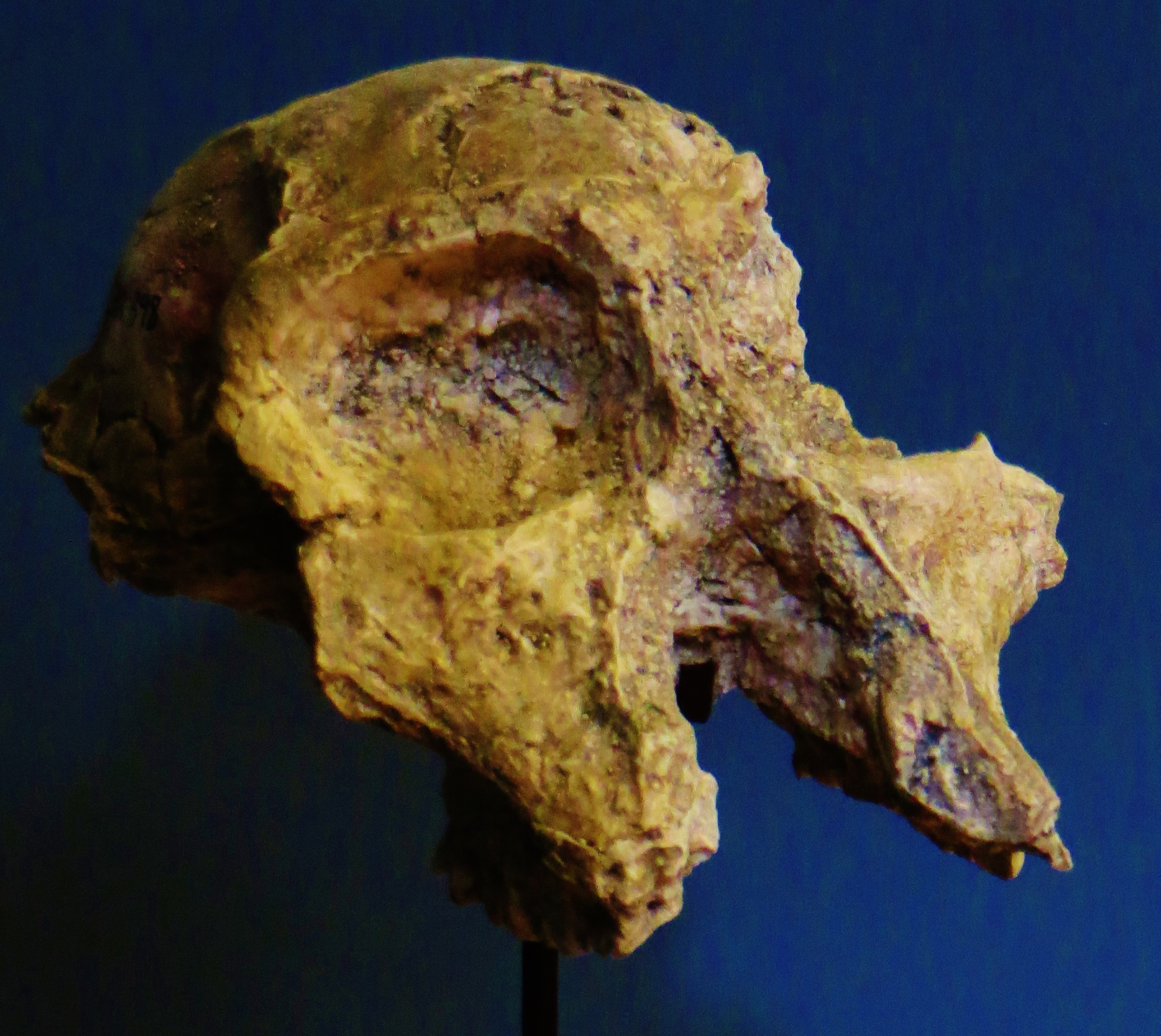
- A female C. kimeui skull

Scientific classification
- Domain: Eukaryota
- Kingdom: Animalia
- Phylum: Chordata
- Class: Mammalia
- Order: Primates
- Suborder: Haplorhini
- Infraorder: Simiiformes
- Family: Cercopithecidae
- Subfamily: Colobinae
- Genus: †Cercopithecoides; Mollett, 1947

Species
- †C. bruneti Pallas et al., 2019; †C. kimeui Leakey, 1982; †C. williamsi Mollett, 1947(type species)

= Cercopithecoides =

Cercopithecoides Temporal range: Miocene–Pleistocene

Extinct genus of Old World monkeys

Cercopithecoides is an extinct genus of colobine monkey from Africa which lived during the latest Miocene to the Pleistocene period. There are several recognized species, with the smallest close in size to some of the larger extant colobines, and males of the largest species weighed over 50 kilograms (110 lb).

The type species, Cercopithecoides williamsi, was named by O. D. Mollett in 1947, based on a partial cranium and mandible of a male individual from Makapansgat, South Africa. It has since been found across many Pliocene and Pleistocene sites in South Africa, Angola, and Kenya. The largest species, Cercopithecoides kimeui, was named by Meave Leakey in 1982, based on fossils found in Kenya and Tanzania.
