= Parapapio =

Scientific classification
- Kingdom: Animalia
- Phylum: Chordata
- Class: Mammalia
- Order: Primates
- Family: Cercopithecidae
- Subfamily: Cercopithecinae
- Tribe: Papionini
- Genus: †Parapapio; T.R. Jones, 1937

Species
- † Parapapio jonesi † Parapapio whitei † Parapapio broomi † Parapapio lothagamensis

Extinct genus of Old World monkeys

Parapapio is a genus of prehistoric baboons closely resembling the forest-dwelling mangabeys. Parapapio is distinguished from other Papio by the lack of an anteorbital drop, thin browridges, absence of maxillary fossae or a sagittal crest and only slight sexual dimorphism.

There are four recognized species, Pp. jonesi, Pp. whitei, Pp. broomi, and Pp. lothagamensis, but these taxonomic designations have generated some controversy. Traditionally, these species have been distinguished based on molar size with Pp. jonesi being the smallest and Pp. whitei the largest. However, variation in molar size in Pp. broomi overlaps the other two. Pp. jonesi is distinguished as having a more squarish muzzle than Pp. whitei but more rounded than Pp. broomi; however these distinctions are subtle and better diagnostic criteria are needed.

Some authors argue for a confused taxonomy in Parapapio but disagree with the reclassification. Since there may be no significant difference between mean tooth sizes or isotopic signatures in Pp. broomi and Pp. jonesi, these may represent a single sexually dimorphic species. However, the ranges of variation in Pp. broomi and Pp. whitei overlap and show no statistical differences based on an ANOVA run on the eleven interlandmark distances used in their analysis, and propose that the two are merely a single variable species. The sample of Pp. jonesi (STS 565) differs enough in facial characteristics that it remains distinctive from other Parapapio species.
