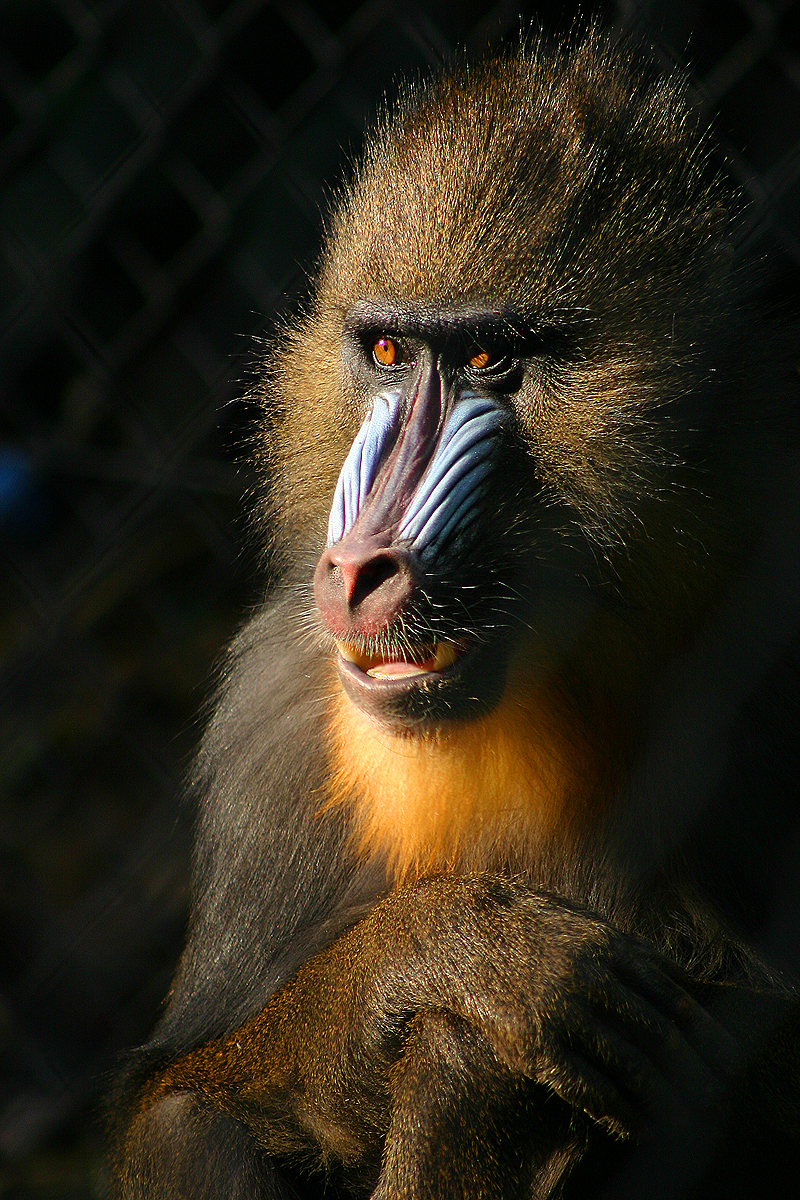
- Mandrill (Mandrillus sphinx)

Scientific classification
- Domain: Eukaryota
- Kingdom: Animalia
- Phylum: Chordata
- Class: Mammalia
- Order: Primates
- Suborder: Haplorhini
- Infraorder: Simiiformes
- Family: Cercopithecidae
- Subfamily: Cercopithecinae; Gray, 1821

Tribes
- Cercopithecini – 6 Genera; Papionini – 7 Genera

= Cercopithecinae =

Cercopithecine monkeys

Subfamily of Old World monkeys

The Cercopithecinae are a subfamily of the Old World monkeys, which comprises roughly 71 species, including the baboons, the macaques, and the vervet monkeys. Most cercopithecine monkeys are limited to sub-Saharan Africa, although the macaques range from the far eastern parts of Asia through northern Africa, as well as on Gibraltar.

== Characteristics ==
The various species are adapted to the different terrains they inhabit. Arboreal species are slim, delicate, and have a long tail, while terrestrial species are stockier and their tails can be small or completely nonexistent. All species have well-developed thumbs. Some species have ischial callosities on their rump, which can change their colour during their mating periods.

These monkeys are diurnal and live together in social groups. They live in all types of terrain and climate, from rain forests, savannah, and bald rocky areas, to cool or even snowy mountains, such as the Japanese macaque.

Most species are omnivorous, with diets ranging from fruits, leaves, seeds, buds, and mushrooms to insects, spiders, and smaller vertebrates. All species possess cheek pouches in which they can store food.

Gestation lasts around six to seven months. Young are weaned after three to 12 months and are fully mature within three to five years. The life expectancy of some species can be as long as 50 years.

== Classification ==
The Cercopithinae are often split into two tribes, Cercopithecini and Papionini, as shown in the list of genera below.

- - - - Homo
      - Pan
    - Hylobates
- - Cercopithecinae
    - - Macaca
      - - - Papio
          - Theropithecus
        - Cercocebus
    - - - Chlorocebus
        - Erythrocebus
      - Miopithecus
  - Colobinae
    - - Colobus
      - - - Pygathrix
          - Nasalis
        - Trachypithecus

Phylogenetic position of the Cercopithecinae.

- Family Cercopithecidae
  - Subfamily Cercopithecinae
    - Tribe Cercopithecini
      - Genus Allenopithecus – Allen's swamp monkey
      - Genus Miopithecus – talapoins
      - Genus Erythrocebus – patas monkeys
      - Genus Chlorocebus – vervet monkeys, etc.
      - Genus Allochrocebus – terrestrial guenons
      - Genus Cercopithecus – guenons
    - Tribe Papionini
      - Genus Macaca – macaques
      - Genus Lophocebus – crested mangabeys
      - Genus Rungwecebus – highland mangabey
      - Genus Papio – baboons
      - Genus Theropithecus – gelada
      - Genus Cercocebus – white-eyelid mangabeys
      - Genus Mandrillus – drill and mandrill
  - Subfamily Colobinae

== See also ==
- Parapapio
