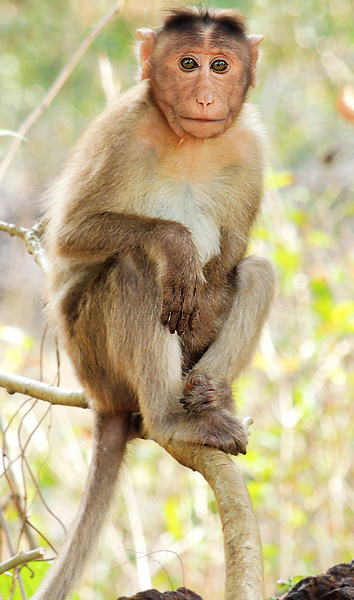
- Bonnet macaque in Manegaon, Maharashtra, India

Scientific classification
- Kingdom: Animalia
- Phylum: Chordata
- Class: Mammalia
- Order: Primates
- Family: Cercopithecidae
- Subfamily: Cercopithecinae
- Tribe: Papionini
- Genus: Macaca; Lacépède, 1799

Type species
- Simia inuus Linnaeus, 1766 (= Simia sylvanus Linnaeus, 1758)

Species
- See text

= Macaque =

Macaques

Genus of Old World monkeys

The macaques (/məˈkɑːk, -ˈkæk/) constitute a genus (Macaca) of gregarious Old World monkeys of the subfamily Cercopithecinae. The 23 species of macaques inhabit ranges throughout Asia, North Africa, and Europe (in Gibraltar). Macaques are principally frugivorous (preferring fruit), although their diet also includes seeds, leaves, flowers, and tree bark. Some species such as the long-tailed macaque (M. fascicularis; also called the crab-eating macaque) will supplement their diets with small amounts of meat from shellfish, insects, and small mammals. On average, a southern pig-tailed macaque (M. nemestrina) in Malaysia eats about 70 large rats each year. All macaque social groups are arranged around dominant matriarchs.

Macaques are found in a variety of habitats throughout the Asian continent and are highly adaptable. Certain species are synanthropic, having learned to live alongside humans, but they have become problematic in urban areas in Southeast Asia and are not suitable to live with, as they can carry transmittable diseases.

Most macaque species are listed as vulnerable to critically endangered on the International Union of the Conservation of Nature (IUCN) Red List.

== Description ==
Aside from humans (genus Homo), the macaques are the most widespread primate genus, ranging from Japan to the Indian subcontinent, and in the case of the Barbary macaque (Macaca sylvanus), to North Africa and Southern Europe. Twenty-three macaque species are currently recognized. Macaques are robust primates whose arms and legs are about the same in length. The fur of these animals is typically varying shades of brown or black and their muzzles are rounded in profile with nostrils on the upper surface. The tail varies among each species, which can be long, moderate, short or totally absent. Although several species lack tails, and their common names refer to them as apes, these are true monkeys, with no greater relationship to the true apes than any other Old World monkeys. Instead, this comes from an earlier definition of 'ape' that included primates generally.

In some species, skin folds join the second through fifth toes, almost reaching the first metatarsal joint. The monkey's size differs depending on sex and species. Males from all species can range from 41 to 70 cm (16 to 27.5 in) in head and body length, and in weight from 5.5 to 18 kg (12 to 40 lb). Females can range from a weight of 2.4 to 13 kg (5.3 to 28.7 lb). These primates live in troops that vary in size, where males dominate, however the order of dominance frequently shifts. Female dominance lasts longer and depends upon their genealogical position. Macaques are able to swim and spend most of their time on the ground and spend some time in trees. They have large pouches in their cheeks where they carry extra food. They are considered highly intelligent and are often used in the medical field for experimentation due to their remarkable similarity to humans in emotional and cognitive development. Extensive experimentation has led to the long-tailed macaque being listed as endangered.

== Distribution and habitat ==
Macaques are highly adaptable to different habitats and climates and can tolerate a wide fluctuation of temperatures and live in varying landscape settings. They easily adapt to human-built environments and can survive well in urban settings if they are able to obtain food. They can also survive in completely natural settings absent of humans.

The ecological and geographic ranges of the macaque are the widest of any non-human primate. Their habitats include the tropical rainforests of Southeast Asia, Sri Lanka, India, arid mountains of Pakistan and Afghanistan, and temperate mountains in Algeria, Japan, China, Morocco, and Nepal. Some species also inhabit villages and towns in cities in Asia. There is also an introduced population of rhesus macaques in the US state of Florida consisting, essentially, of monkeys abandoned when a failed boat ride-safari was shut down in the mid-20th century.

A probable Early Pliocene macaque molar from the Red Crag Formation (Waldringfield, United Kingdom), represents one of the oldest and northernmost records of the genus in Europe reported to date.

== Ecology and behavior ==
=== Diet ===
Macaques are mainly frugivorous, although some species have been observed feeding on insects. In natural habitats, they have been observed to consume certain parts of over one hundred species of plants including the buds, fruit, young leaves, bark, roots, and flowers. When macaques live amongst people, they raid agricultural crops such as wheat, rice, or sugarcane; and garden crops like tomatoes, bananas, melons, mangos, or papayas. In human settings, they also rely heavily on direct handouts from people. This includes peanuts, rice, legumes, or even prepared food.

=== Group structure ===
Macaques live in established social groups that can range from a few individuals to several hundred, as they are social animals. A typical social group possess between 20 and 50 individuals of all ages and of both sexes. The typical composition consists of 15% adult males, 35% adult females, 20% infants, and 30% juveniles, though there exists variation in structure and size of groups across populations.

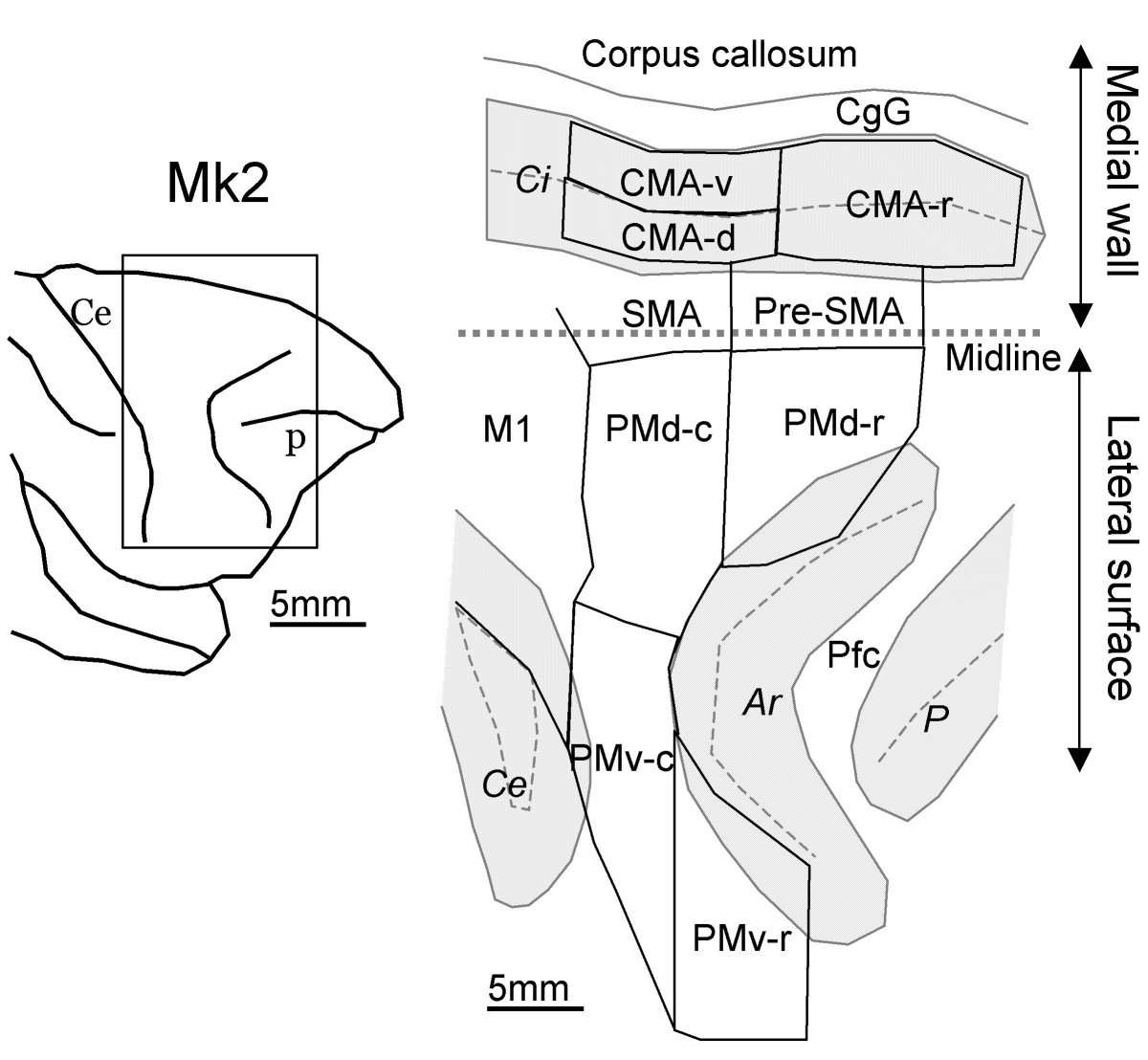
The premotor cortex of macaques is widely studied.

Macaques have a very intricate social structure and hierarchy, with different classifications of despotism depending on species. If a macaque of a lower level in the social chain has eaten berries and none are left for a higher-ranking macaque, then the one higher in status can, within this social organization, remove the berries from the other monkey's mouth.

=== Reproduction and mortality ===
The reproductive potential of each species differs. Populations of the rhesus macaque can grow at rates of 10% to 15% per year if the environmental conditions are favorable. However, some forest-dwelling species are endangered with much lower reproductive rates. After one year of age, macaques move from being dependent on their mother during infancy, to the juvenile stage, where they begin to associate more with other juveniles through rough tumble and playing activities. They sexually mature between three and five years of age. Females will usually stay with the social group in which they were born; however, young adult males tend to disperse and attempt to enter other social groups. Not all males succeed in joining other groups and may become solitary, attempting to join other social groups for many years. Macaques have a typical lifespan of 20 to 30 years.

=== As invasive species ===
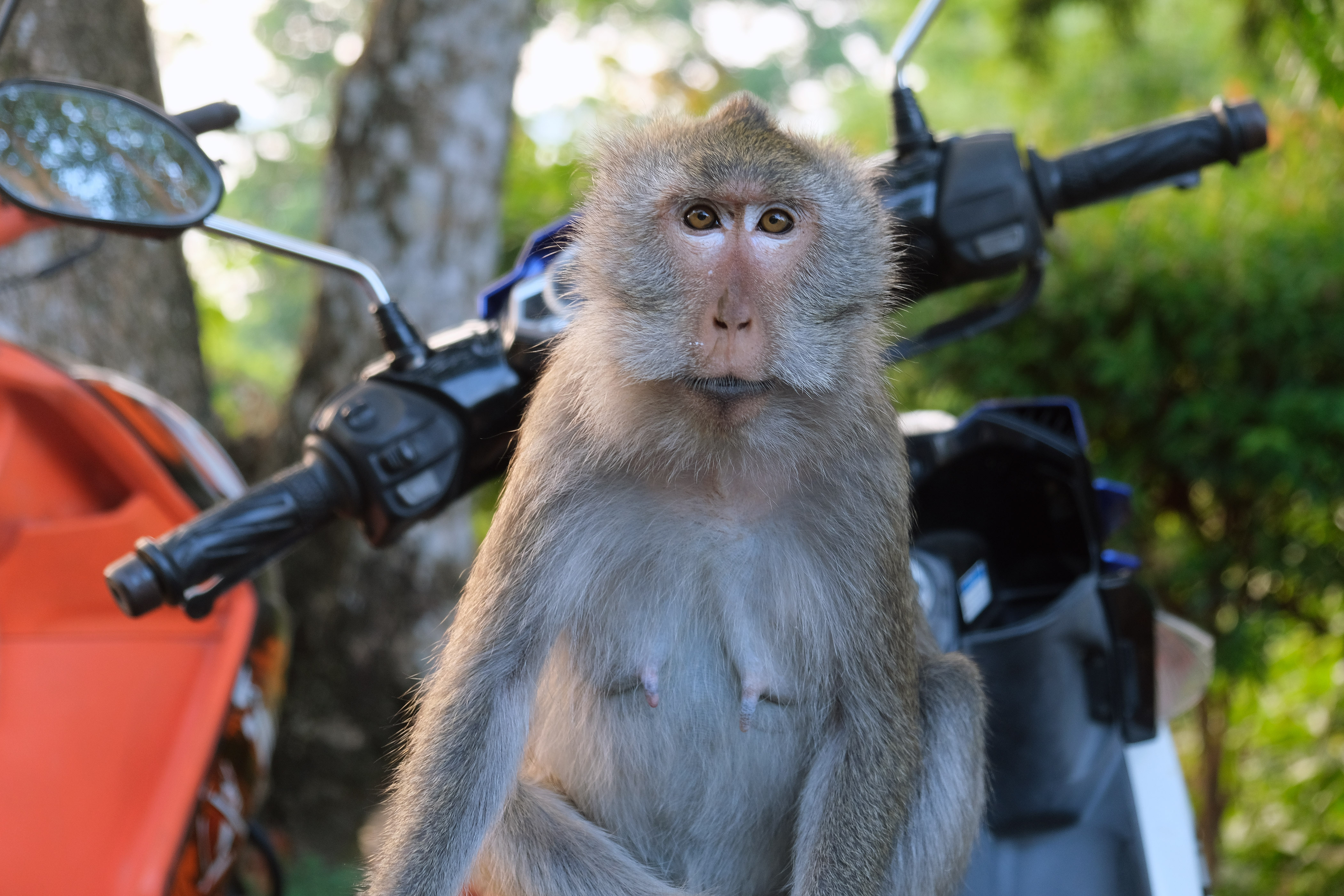
M. fascicularis on a scooter at Ko Chang, Thailand

Certain species under the genus Macaca have been transplanted to different parts of the world, where they become invasive, while others remain threatened. The long-tailed macaque (M. fascicularis) is listed as an invasive alien species in Mauritius, along with the rhesus macaques (M. mulatta) in Florida. Despite this, the former is listed as endangered.

The long-tailed macaque causes severe damage to parts of its range where it has been introduced because the populations grow unchecked due to a lack of predators. On the island of Mauritius, they have created serious conservation concerns for other endemic species. They consume seeds of native plants and aid in the spread of exotic weeds throughout the forests. This changes the composition of the habitats and allows them to be rapidly overrun by invasive plants.

Long-tailed macaques are also responsible for the near extinction of several bird species on Mauritius by destroying the nests of the birds and eating the eggs of critically endangered species, such as the pink pigeon and Mauritian green parrot. They have been known to eat crops from human farms and gardens, sparking human-wildlife conflicts.

In Florida, a group of rhesus macaques inhabit Silver Springs State Park. Humans often feed them, which may alter their movement and keep them close to the river on weekends where high human traffic is present. The monkeys can become aggressive toward humans, largely due to human ignorance of macaque behavior. They carry potentially fatal human diseases, including the herpes B virus.

== Relations with humans ==
Several species of macaque are used extensively in animal testing, particularly in the neuroscience of visual perception and the visual system.

Nearly all (73–100%) captive rhesus macaques are carriers of the herpes B virus. This virus is harmless to macaques, but infections of humans, while rare, are potentially fatal, a risk that makes macaques unsuitable as pets.

Urban performing macaques also carried simian foamy virus, suggesting they could be involved in the species-to-species jump of similar retroviruses to humans.

=== Population control ===
Management techniques have historically been controversial, and public disapproval can hinder control efforts. Previously, efforts to remove macaque individuals were met with public resistance. One management strategy that is currently being explored is that of sterilization. Natural resource managers are being educated by scientific studies in the proposed strategy. Effectiveness of this strategy is estimated to succeed in keeping populations in check. For example, if 80% of females are sterilized every five years, or 50% every two years, it could effectively reduce the population. Other control strategies include planting specific trees to provide protection to native birds from macaque predation, live trapping, and the vaccine porcine zona pellucida (PZP), which causes infertility in females.

=== Cloning ===
In January 2018, scientists in China reported in the journal Cell the first creation of two crab-eating macaque clones, named Zhong Zhong and Hua Hua, using somatic cell nuclear transfer – the same method that produced Dolly the sheep.

=== In folklore and culture ===
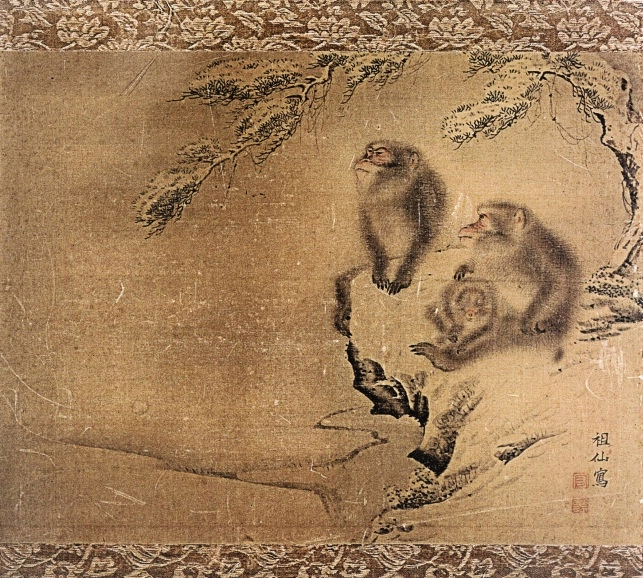
Painting of Japanese macaques by artist Mori Sosen.

As a widespread genus with many interactions with humans, macaques are significant to the broader folklore of monkeys. The Japanese macaque is the only monkey native to Japan, and features prominently in motifs such as the three wise monkeys. The artist Mori Sosen was famed for his paintings of macaques.

Wu Cheng'en's classic novel Journey to the West features two macaques: one minor character, the Macaque King (獼猴王), is named as one of Sun Wukong's seven sworn brothers during his rebellion against the Jade Emperor; and the more prominent Six-Eared Macaque (六耳獼猴), who impersonates Wukong and attacks Tang Sanzang before being exposed by the Tathāgata Buddha. Sun Wukong himself is often depicted as resembling a macaque.

== Species ==
Genus Macaca – Lacépède, 1799 – 24 species
Common name	Scientific name and subspecies	Range	Size and ecology	IUCN status and estimated population
Arunachal macaque	M. munzala Sinha, Datta, Madhusudan, Mishra, 2005	Eastern Himalayas	Size: 36–77 cm (14–30 in) long, plus about 9–20 cm (4–8 in) tail Habitat: Forest Diet: Fruit, leaves, grains, buds, seeds, flowers, and bark, as well as insects and small invertebrates	EN 250
Assam macaque	M. assamensis (McClelland, 1840) Two subspecies: M. a. assamensis (Eastern Assamese macaque); M. a. pelops (Western Assamese macaque)	Southeastern Asia	Size: 36–77 cm (14–30 in) long, plus about 9–20 cm (4–8 in) tail Habitat: Forest Diet: Fruit, leaves, grains, buds, seeds, flowers, and bark, as well as insects and small invertebrates	NT Unknown
Barbary macaque	M. sylvanus (Linnaeus, 1758)	Northwestern Africa	Size: 45–60 cm (18–24 in) long, plus 1–2 cm (0–1 in) tail Habitat: Forest, shrubland, grassland, rocky areas, and caves Diet: Plants, caterpillars, fruit, seeds, roots, and fungi	EN Unknown
Bonnet macaque	M. radiata (Geoffroy, 1812) Two subspecies: M. r. diluta (Pale-bellied bonnet macaque); M. r. radiata (Dark-bellied bonnet macaque)	Southern India	Size: 36–77 cm (14–30 in) long, plus about 9–20 cm (4–8 in) tail Habitat: Forest, savanna, and shrubland Diet: Fruit, foliage, and insects, as well as bird eggs and lizards	VU Unknown
Booted macaque	M. ochreata (Ogilby, 1841)	Island of Sulawesi in Indonesia	Size: 36–77 cm (14–30 in) long, plus about 1–15 cm (0–6 in) tail Habitat: Forest and savanna Diet: Fruit, leaves, grains, buds, seeds, flowers, and bark, as well as insects and small invertebrates	VU Unknown
Celebes crested macaque	M. nigra (Desmarest, 1822)	Island of Sulawesi	Size: 44–57 cm (17–22 in) long, plus about 2 cm (1 in) tail Habitat: Forest Diet: Fruit, as well as insects, shoots, leaves, and stems	CR Unknown
Crab-eating macaque	M. fascicularis (Raffles, 1821) Ten subspecies: M. f. atriceps (Dark-crowned long-tailed macaque); M. f. aureus (Burmese long-tailed macaque); M. f. condorensis (Con Song long-tailed macaque); M. f. fascicularis (Common long-tailed macaque); M. f. fusca (Simeulue long-tailed macaque); M. f. karimondjawae (Kemujan long-tailed macaque); M. f. lasiae (Lasia long-tailed macaque); M. f. philippensis (Philippine long-tailed macaque); M. f. tua (Maratua long-tailed macaque); M. f. umbrosus (Nicobar long-tailed macaque)	Southeastern Asia	Size: 40–47 cm (16–19 in) long, plus 50–60 cm (20–24 in) tail Habitat: Forest, intertidal marine, caves, inland wetlands, grassland, shrubland, and savanna Diet: Fruit, crabs, flowers, insects, leaves, fungi, grasses, and clay	EN Unknown
Formosan rock macaque	M. cyclopis Swinhoe, 1862	Taiwan	Size: 36–45 cm (14–18 in) long, plus 26–46 cm (10–18 in) tail Habitat: Forest Diet: Fruit, leaves, berries, seeds, insects, and small vertebrates, buds, and shoots	LC Unknown
Gorontalo macaque	M. nigrescens (Temminck, 1849)	Island of Sulawesi	Size: 36–77 cm (14–30 in) long, plus about 1–15 cm (0–6 in) tail Habitat: Forest Diet: Fruit, leaves, grains, buds, seeds, flowers, and bark, as well as insects and small invertebrates	VU Unknown
Heck's macaque	M. hecki (Matschie, 1901)	Island of Sulawesi	Size: 36–77 cm (14–30 in) long, plus about 1–15 cm (0–6 in) tail Habitat: Forest and grassland Diet: Fruit, leaves, grains, buds, seeds, flowers, and bark, as well as insects and small invertebrates	VU 100,000
Japanese macaque	M. fuscata (Blyth, 1875) Two subspecies: M. f. fuscata; M. f. yakui (Yakushima macaque)	Japan	Size: 36–77 cm (14–30 in) long, plus about 1–15 cm (0–6 in) tail Habitat: Forest Diet: Fruit, seeds, flowers, nectar, leaves, and fungi	LC Unknown
Lion-tailed macaque	M. silenus (Linnaeus, 1758)	Southwestern India	Size: 40–61 cm (16–24 in) long, plus 24–38 cm (9–15 in) tail Habitat: Forest Diet: Fruit, as well as leaves, stems, flowers, buds, fungi, insects, lizards, tree frogs, and small mammals	EN 2,400–2,500
Moor macaque	M. maura (Schinz, 1825)	Island of Sulawesi	Size: 36–77 cm (14–30 in) long, plus about 1–15 cm (0–6 in) tail Habitat: Forest and grassland Diet: Fruit, leaves, grains, buds, seeds, flowers, and bark, as well as insects and small invertebrates	EN Unknown
Muna-Buton macaque	M. brunnescens (Matschie, 1901)	Island of Sulawesi in Indonesia	Size: 36–77 cm (14–30 in) long, plus about 1–15 cm (0–6 in) tail Habitat: Forest Diet: Fruit, leaves, grains, buds, seeds, flowers, and bark, as well as insects and small invertebrates	VU Unknown
Northern pig-tailed macaque	M. leonina (Blyth, 1863)	Southeastern Asia	Size: 36–77 cm (14–30 in) long, plus about 9–20 cm (4–8 in) tail Habitat: Forest Diet: Leaves, seeds, stems, roots, flowers, bamboo shoots, rice, gums, insects, larvae, termite eggs and spiders	VU Unknown
Pagai Island macaque	M. pagensis (G. S. Miller, 1903)	Mentawai Islands in Indonesia	Size: 36–77 cm (14–30 in) long, plus about 9–20 cm (4–8 in) tail Habitat: Forest Diet: Fruit, leaves, grains, buds, seeds, flowers, and bark, as well as insects and small invertebrates	CR 2,100–3,700
Rhesus macaque	M. mulatta (Zimmermann, 1790)	Southern and southeastern Asia	Size: 45–64 cm (18–25 in) long, plus 19–32 cm (7–13 in) tail Habitat: Forest, savanna, and shrubland Diet: Fish, crabs, shellfish, bird eggs, honeycombs, crayfish, crabs, spiders, plants, gums and pith	LC Unknown
Siberut macaque	M. siberu Fuentes, 1995	Siberut island in Indonesia	Size: 36–77 cm (14–30 in) long, plus about 9–20 cm (4–8 in) tail Habitat: Forest Diet: Fruit, as well as mushrooms, leaves, crabs, crayfish, pith, sap, shoots and flowers	EN Unknown
Southern pig-tailed macaque	M. nemestrina (Linnaeus, 1766)	Southeastern Asia	Size: 46–57 cm (18–22 in) long, plus 13–26 cm (5–10 in) tail Habitat: Forest and shrubland Diet: Fruit, insects, seeds, leaves, dirt, and fungus, as well as birds, termite eggs and larvae, and river crabs	EN Unknown
Stump-tailed macaque	M. arctoides (I. Geoffroy Saint-Hilaire, 1831)	Southeastern Asia	Size: 48–65 cm (19–26 in) long, plus 3–7 cm (1–3 in) tail Habitat: Forest Diet: Fruit, seeds, flowers, roots, leaves, frogs, crabs, birds, and bird eggs	VU Unknown
Tibetan macaque	M. thibetana (A. Milne-Edwards, 1870) Four subspecies: M. t. esau; M. t. guiahouensis; M. t. huangshanensis; M. t. thibetana	East China	Size: 36–77 cm (14–30 in) long, plus about 1–15 cm (0–6 in) tail Habitat: Forest and caves Diet: Fruit, as well as flowers, berries, seeds, leaves, stems, stalks, and invertebrates	NT Unknown
Tonkean macaque	M. tonkeana (von Meyer, 1899)	Island of Sulawesi	Size: 36–77 cm (14–30 in) long, plus about 1–15 cm (0–6 in) tail Habitat: Forest Diet: Fruit, leaves, grains, buds, seeds, flowers, and bark, as well as insects and small invertebrates	VU Unknown
Toque macaque	M. sinica (Linnaeus, 1771) Three subspecies: M. s. aurifrons (Pale-fronted toque macaque); M. s. opisthomelas (Highland toque macaque); M. s. sinica (Common toque macaque)	Sri Lanka	Size: 36–53 cm (14–21 in) long, plus at least 36–53 cm (14–21 in) tail Habitat: Forest Diet: Fruit as well as tree flowers, buds, and leaves	EN Unknown
White-cheeked macaque	M. leucogenys Li, Zhao, Fan, 2015	Northeastern India	Size: 36–77 cm (14–30 in) long, plus about 9–20 cm (4–8 in) tail Habitat: Forest Diet: Fruit, leaves, grains, buds, seeds, flowers, and bark, as well as insects and small invertebrates	EN Unknown

=== Prehistoric (fossil) species ===
- M. anderssoni Schlosser, 1924
- M. jiangchuanensis Pan et al., 1992
- M. libyca Stromer, 1920
- M. majori Schaub & Azzaroli in Comaschi Caria, 1969 (sometimes included in M. sylvanus)
- M. florentina Cocchi, 1872

== See also ==
- B virus
- Kayabukiya Tavern
- Macaque brain development timeline

== Sources ==
- Nowak, Ronald M. (1999). Walker's Primates of the World. Johns Hopkins University Press. ISBN 978-0-8018-6251-9.
