= List of the Cenozoic life of Utah =

Prehistoric life-forms in US state

This list of the Cenozoic life of Utah contains the various prehistoric life-forms whose fossilized remains have been reported from within the US state of Utah and are between 66 million and 10,000 years of age.

== A ==
- Abies
- †Achaenodon
  - †Achaenodon uintensis – type locality for species
- †Acmeodon
- †Acrocera
  - †Acrocera hirsuta – type locality for species
- †Aenocyon
  - †Aenocyon dirus – or unidentified comparable form
- †Aepinacodon
- †Aethomylos
  - †Aethomylos simplicidens
- †Ageina – or unidentified comparable form
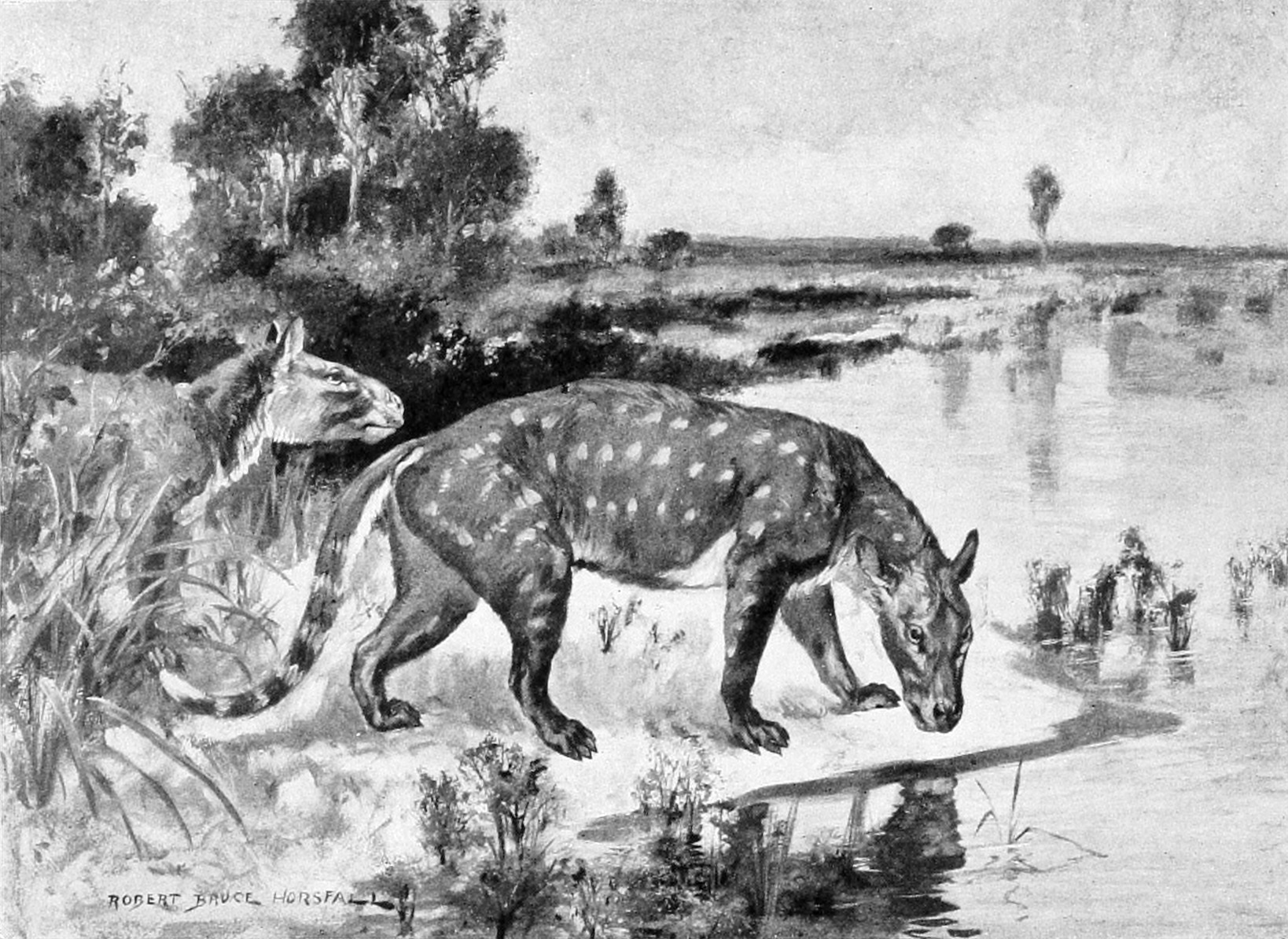
- Life restoration of the Eocene-Oligocene even-toed ungulate Agriochoerus
  †Agriochoerus
  - †Agriochoerus maximus
- Alligator
- †Allognathosuchus – or unidentified comparable form
- †Allophaiomys
  - †Allophaiomys pliocaenicus
- Amia
  - †Amia uintensis
- Amyda
  - †Amyda crassa – type locality for species
  - †Amyda gregaria
- †Amynodon
  - †Amynodon advenus
  - †Amynodon reedi
- †Anaptomorphus
  - †Anaptomorphus aemulus
- †Anemorhysis
- †Anisonchus
  - †Anisonchus athelas
  - †Anisonchus oligistus
  - †Anisonchus onostus
  - †Anisonchus sectorius
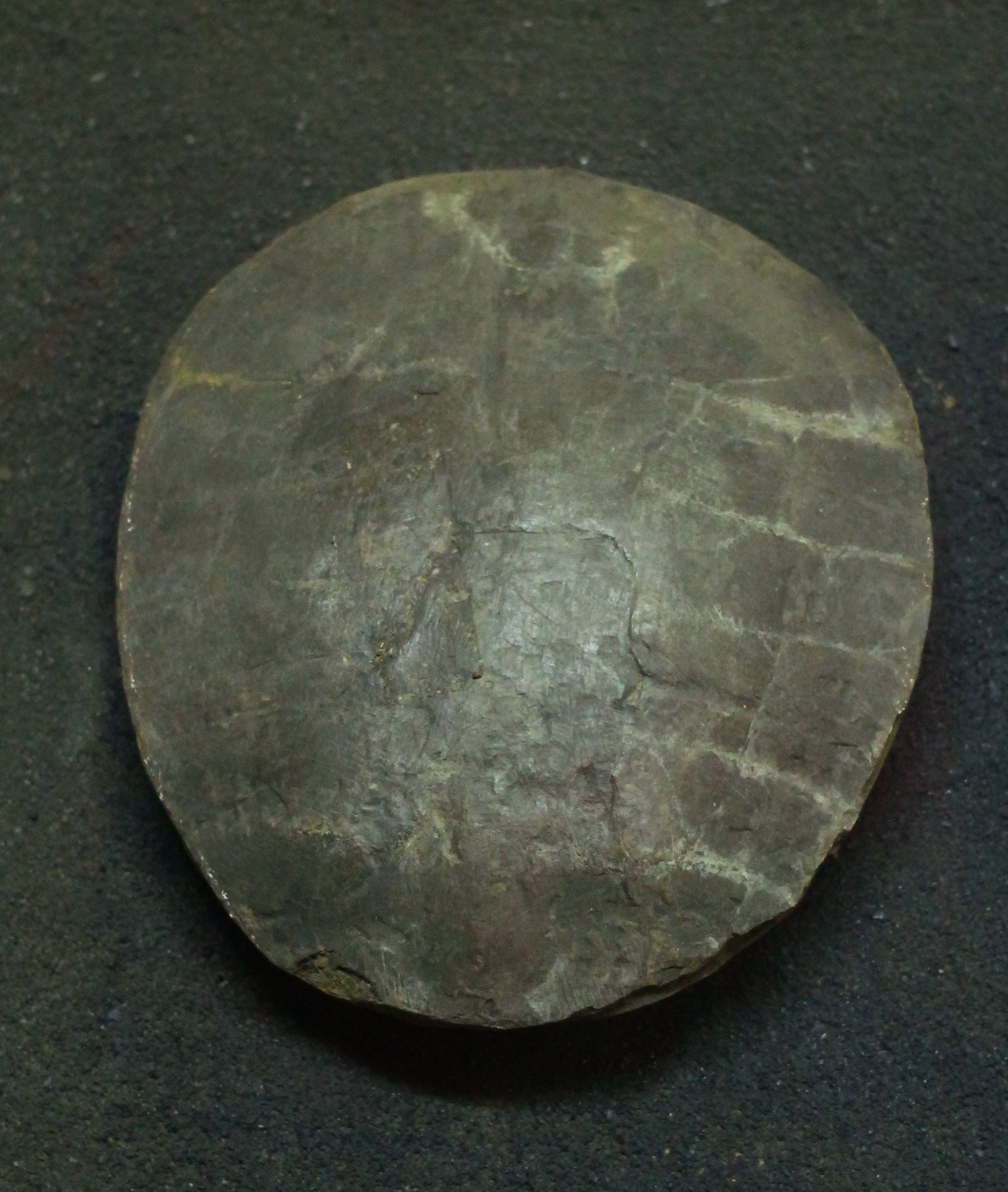
- Fossilized shell of the Eocene-Oligocene turtle Anosteira
  †Anosteira
  - †Anosteira ornata
- Anthonomus
  - †Anthonomus soporus
- †Antiacodon
  - †Antiacodon pygmaeus
- Antilocapra
  - †Antilocapra americana – or unidentified comparable form
- Apalone
- †Apataelurus
  - †Apataelurus kayi – type locality for species
- †Apatemys
  - †Apatemys bellulus – or unidentified comparable form
  - †Apatemys bellus – or unidentified comparable form
  - †Apatemys rodens – or unidentified comparable form
  - †Apatemys uintensis – type locality for species
- †Aphronorus
  - †Aphronorus simpsoni
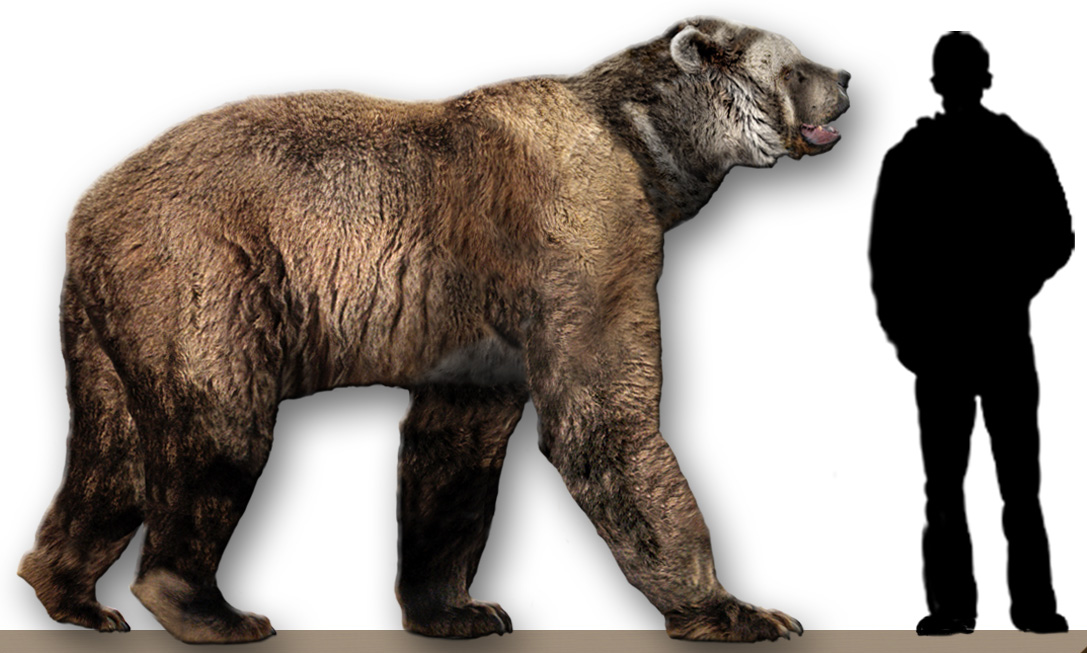
- Restoration of an Arctodus, or short-faced bear, with a human to scale
  †Arctodus
  - †Arctodus simus
- †Armintodelphys
  - †Armintodelphys dawsoni
- †Artemisia
- †Asilopsis – type locality for genus
  - †Asilopsis fusculus – type locality for species
- †Asilus
  - †Asilus palaeolestes – type locality for species
- †Aulobaris
  - †Aulobaris circumscripta
  - †Aulobaris comminuta – type locality for species
- †Auxontodon
  - †Auxontodon pattersoni

== B ==
- †Baena
  - †Baena arenosa – type locality for species
  - †Baena emiliae
- †Baptemys
- †Basirepomys
  - †Basirepomys robertsi – type locality for species
- †Bembidium
  - †Bembidium exoletum – type locality for species
- Bison
  - †Bison latifrons – tentative report
- †Bittacus
  - †Bittacus egestionis – type locality for species
- †Blickomylus
  - †Blickomylus moroni – type locality for species
- †Bootherium
  - †Bootherium bombifrons
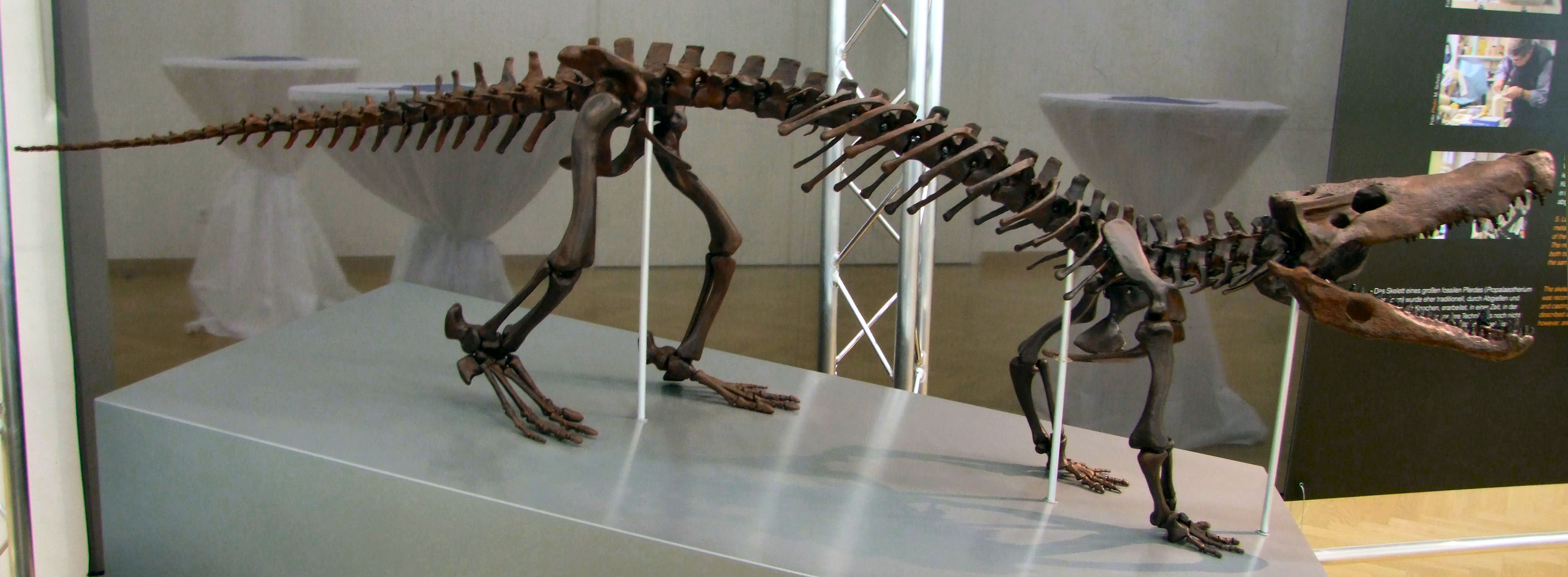
- Fossilized skeleton of the Eocene crocodilian Boverisuchus
  †Boverisuchus
  - †Boverisuchus vorax – type locality for species
- †Brachyhyops
  - †Brachyhyops wyomingensis
- Brachylagus
  - †Brachylagus idahoensis – or unidentified comparable form
- †Bridgeremys
  - †Bridgeremys pusilla – tentative report
- †Bunomeryx
  - †Bunomeryx montanus – type locality for species

== C ==
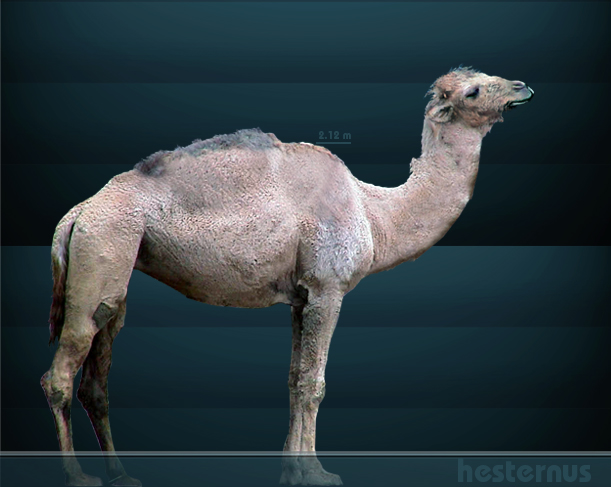
- Life restoration of the Pliocene-Holocene camel Camelops
  †Camelops
  - †Camelops hesternus – or unidentified comparable form
- Camponotus
  - †Camponotus vetus – type locality for species
- Canis
  - †Canis latrans – tentative report
  - †Canis lupus
- †Capricamelus
- †Carabites
  - †Carabites eocenicus – type locality for species
  - †Carabites exanimus – type locality for species
- †Catopsalis
  - †Catopsalis fissidens
- †Cedrelospermum
  - †Cedrelospermum nervosum
- †Centetodon
  - †Centetodon bembicophagus
  - †Centetodon pulcher
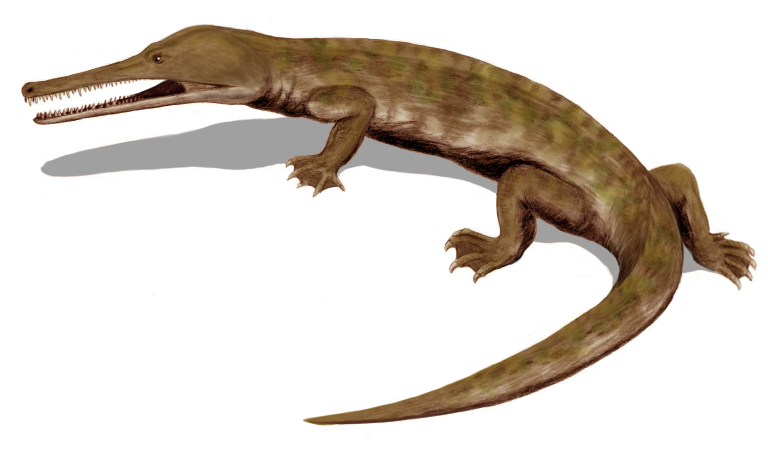
- Life restoration of the Late Cretaceous-Eocene choristoderan reptile Champsosaurus
  †Champsosaurus
- Chara
- Cheilosia
  - †Cheilosia scudderi
- †Chipetaia
  - †Chipetaia lamporea – type locality for species
- †Chisternon
  - †Chisternon undatum – type locality for species
- †Chriacus
  - †Chriacus baldwini
- †Cicindelopsis – type locality for genus
  - †Cicindelopsis eophilus – type locality for species
- †Colodon
- †Compsemys
  - †Compsemys victa
- †Conacodon
  - †Conacodon kohlbergeri
- †Coniatus
  - †Coniatus refractus
- †Conoryctella – type locality for genus
  - †Conoryctella dragonensis – type locality for species
  - †Conoryctella pattersoni
- †Copemys
  - †Copemys mariae – or unidentified related form
- †Coryphodon
  - †Coryphodon lobatus
- †Cristadjidaumo – type locality for genus
  - †Cristadjidaumo mckennai – type locality for species
- Crocodylus
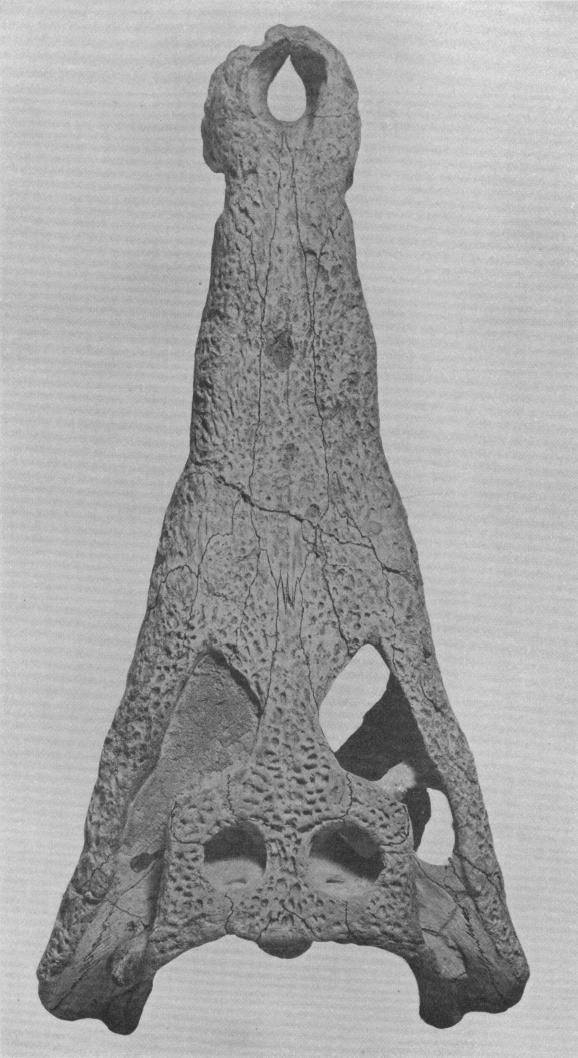
  - Fossilized skull of the Eocene crocodilian Crocodylus acer
    †Crocodylus acer – type locality for species
  - †Crocodylus affinis
- †Crypholestes
- Culex
  - †Culex proavitus – type locality for species
- †Cupidinimus
- †Cuterebra
  - †Cuterebra ascarides
- †Cyttaromyia – type locality for genus
  - †Cyttaromyia fenestrata – type locality for species

== D ==
- †Desmatoclaenus
  - †Desmatoclaenus hermaeus
- Dicranomyia
  - †Dicranomyia primitiva – type locality for species
  - †Dicranomyia rostrata – type locality for species
  - †Dicranomyia stigmosa – type locality for species
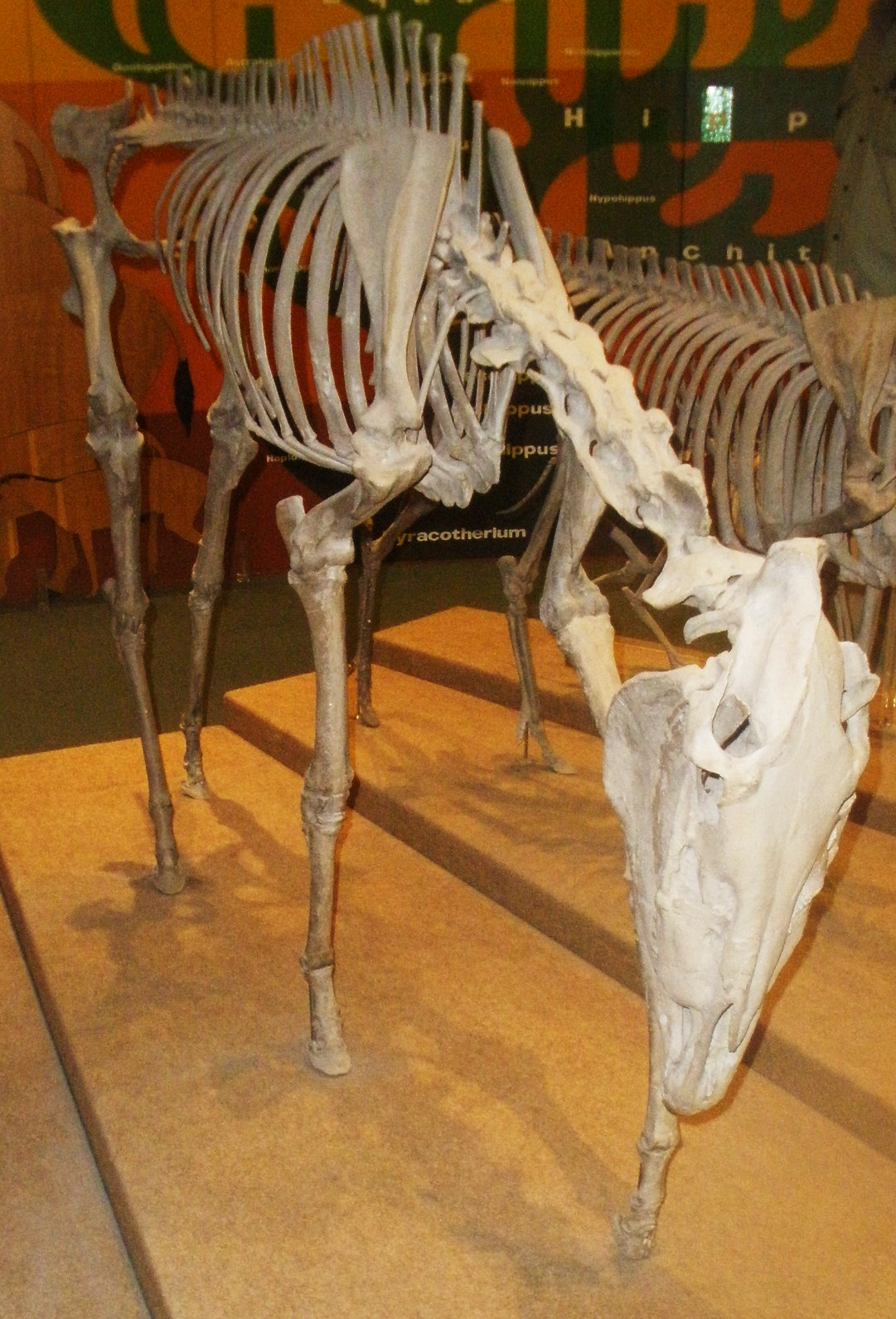
- Mounted fossilized skeleton of the Miocene-Pliocene horse Dinohippus
  †Dinohippus
- †Diplacodon
  - †Diplacodon elatus
  - †Diplacodon emarginatus – type locality for species
- †Diplobunops
  - †Diplobunops crassus
  - †Diplobunops matthewi
- †Diprionomys
  - †Diprionomys minimus – or unidentified comparable form
- †Dipsalidictis
  - †Dipsalidictis transiens
- †Draconodus
  - †Draconodus apertus
- †Dracontolestes
  - †Dracontolestes aphantus – type locality for species
- †Duchesnehippus
  - †Duchesnehippus intermedius
- †Duchesneodus
  - †Duchesneodus uintensis

== E ==
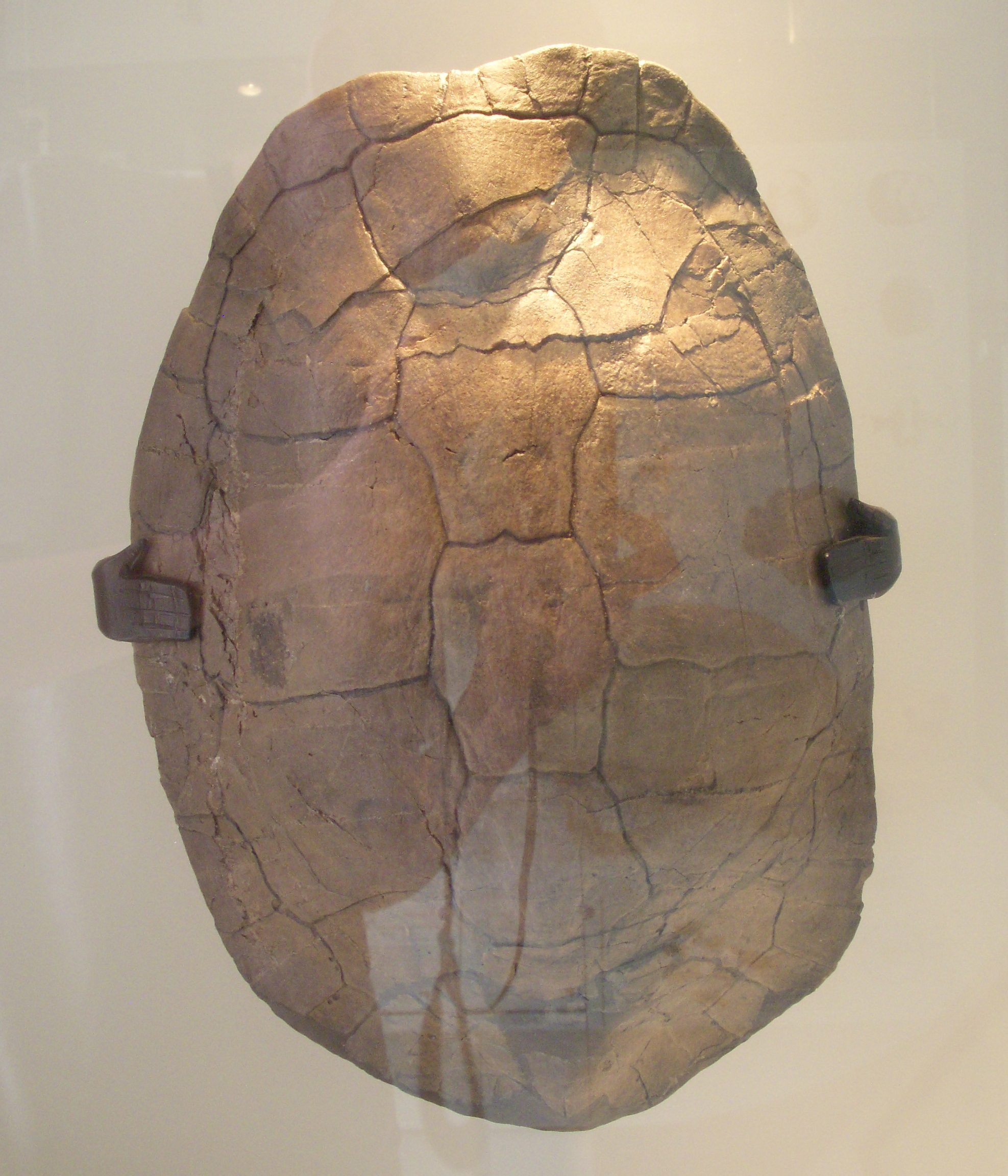
- Fossilized shell of the Eocene turtle Echmatemys
  †Echmatemys
  - †Echmatemys depressa – type locality for species
  - †Echmatemys douglassi – type locality for species
  - †Echmatemys septaria – type locality for species
  - †Echmatemys uintensis
- †Ectoconus
  - †Ectoconus ditrigonus
  - †Ectoconus symbolus
- †Ellipsodon
  - †Ellipsodon grangeri
  - †Ellipsodon lemuroides
  - †Ellipsodon sternbergi – type locality for species
- †Elliptio
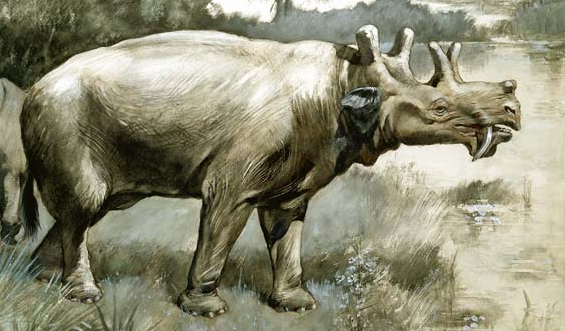
- Life restoration of a pair of the Eocene uintathere mammal Eobasileus. Charles R. Knight (1890s).
  †Eobasileus
  - †Eobasileus cornutus
- †Eobracon – type locality for genus
  - †Eobracon cladurus – type locality for species
- †Eocaenonemonyx
  - †Eocaenonemonyx kuscheli – type locality for species
- †Eoconodon
- †Eodiploglossus
  - †Eodiploglossus borealis
- †Eoformica
  - †Eoformica pinguis – type locality for species
- †Eomoropus
  - †Eomoropus amarorum – type locality for species
  - †Eomoropus anarsius
- †Eonessa – type locality for genus
  - †Eonessa anaticula – type locality for species
- †Epicaerus
  - †Epicaerus effossus
  - †Epicaerus eradicatus
  - †Epicaerus evigoratus
  - †Epicaerus exanimis
  - †Epicaerus subterraneus
  - †Epicaerus terrosus
- †Epihippus
  - †Epihippus gracilis
- †Epiphanis
  - †Epiphanis deletus – type locality for species
- †Epitriplopus
  - †Epitriplopus uintensis
- Equus
  - †Equus conversidens – tentative report
- Erethizon
  - †Erethizon dorsatum – tentative report
- †Eucastor
  - †Eucastor tortus – or unidentified comparable form
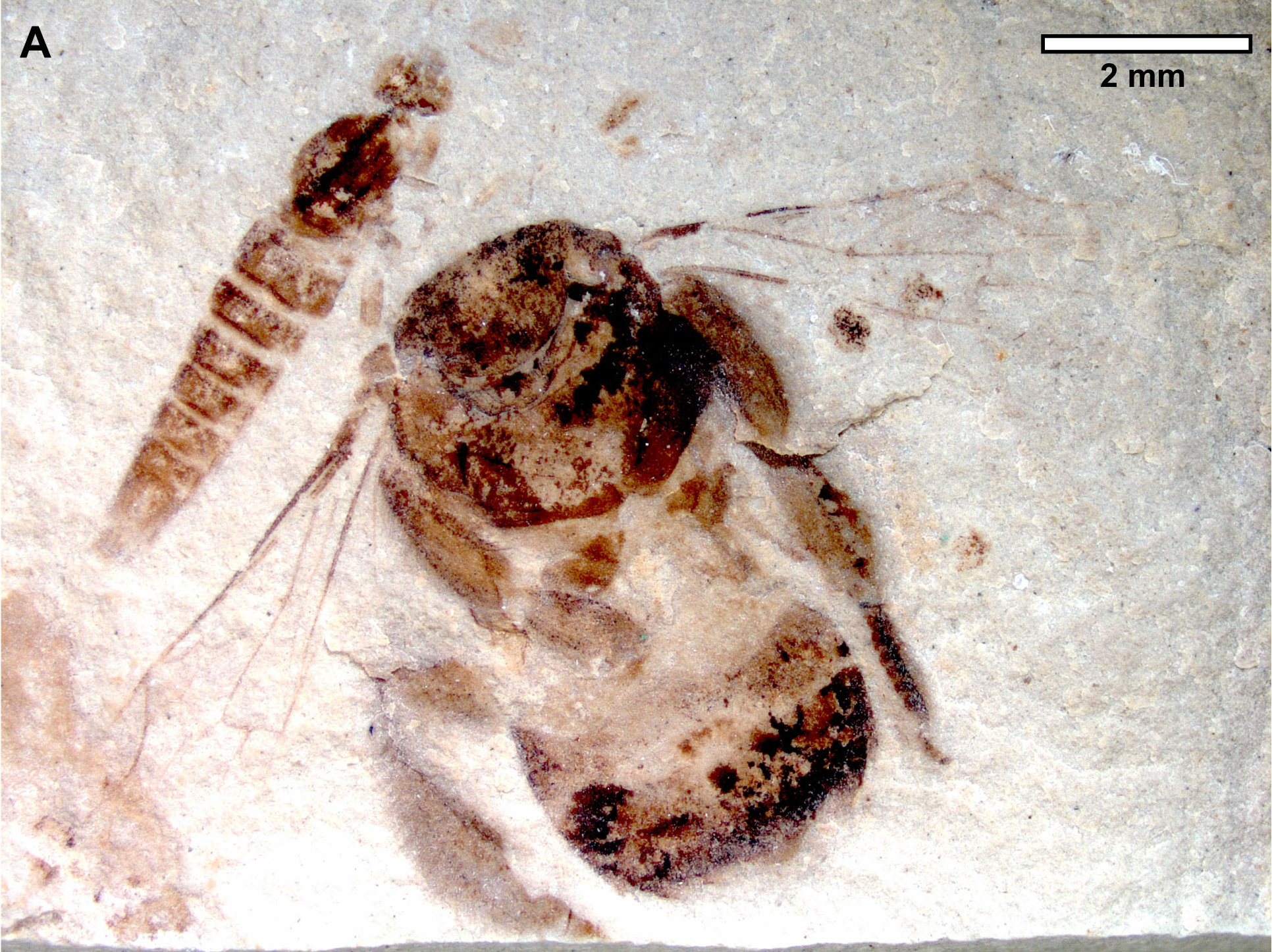
- Fossil of the Eocene bee Euglossopteryx
  †Euglossopteryx – type locality for genus
  - †Euglossopteryx biesmeijeri – type locality for species
- Eutamias
  - †Eutamias minimus

== G ==
- †Glyptosaurus
  - †Glyptosaurus sylvestris
- †Gnoriste
  - †Gnoriste dentoni – type locality for species
- †Goniacodon
  - †Goniacodon hiawathae
- †Griphomys

== H ==
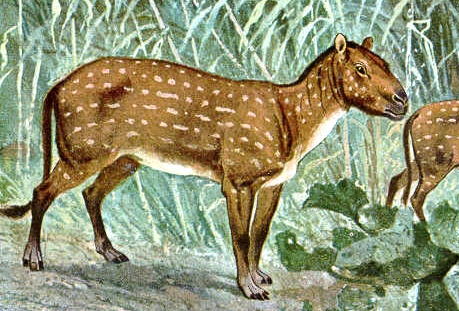
Life restoration of the Eocene horse Eohippus. Heinrich Harder (1920).

- †Hadrianus
  - †Hadrianus corsoni
  - †Hadrianus utahensis – type locality for species
- †Haplaletes
  - †Haplaletes andakupensis
- †Haploconus
  - †Haploconus angustus
  - †Haploconus elachistus
- †Haplolambda – or unidentified comparable form
  - †Haplolambda simpsoni – type locality for species
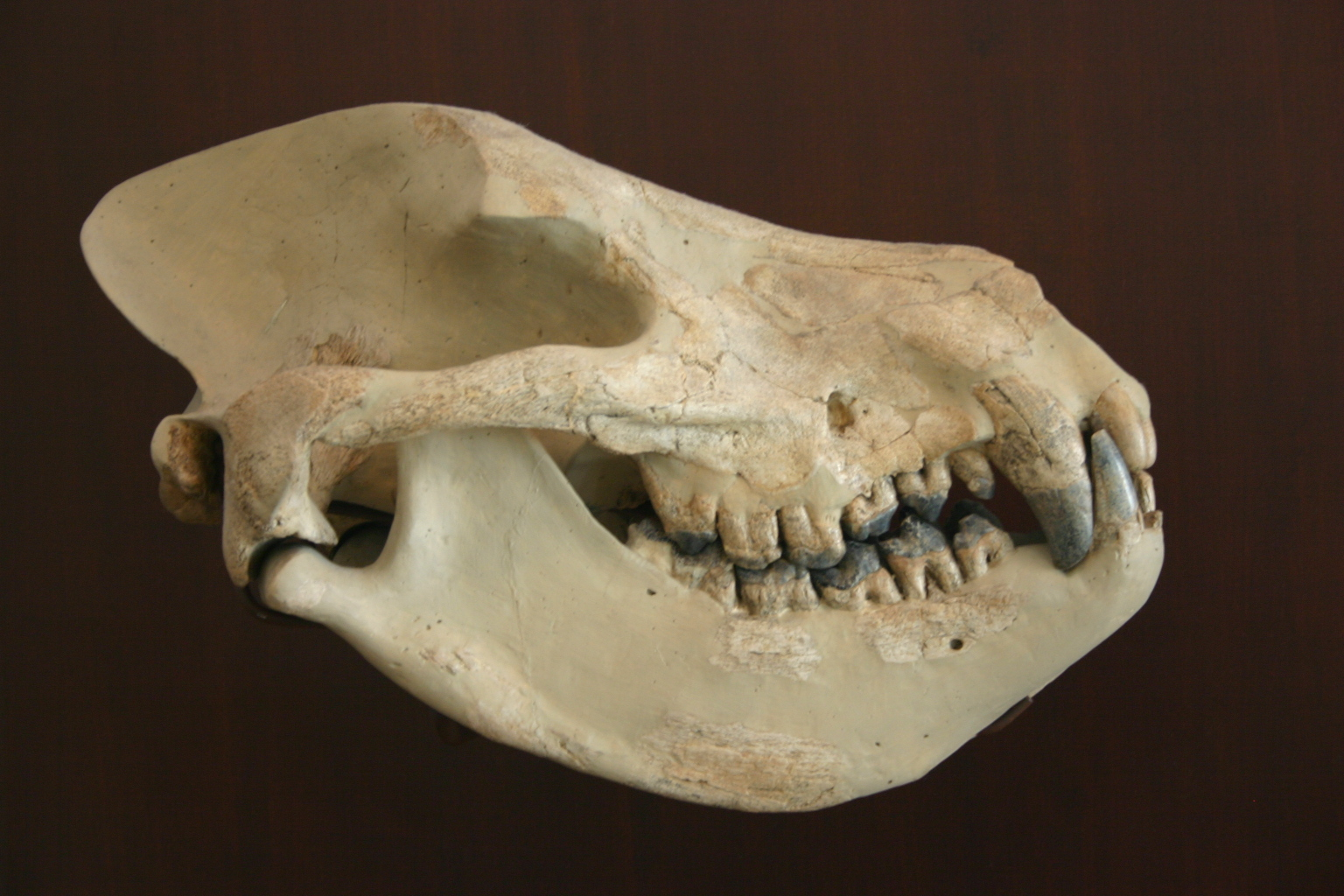
- Fossilized skull of the mesonychian mammal Harpagolestes
  †Harpagolestes
  - †Harpagolestes brevipes – type locality for species
  - †Harpagolestes leotensis – type locality for species
  - †Harpagolestes uintensis
- †Helaletes
  - †Helaletes nanus
- †Helodermoides – tentative report
- †Heptacodon
- †Herpetotherium
  - †Herpetotherium innominatum
- †Hesperolagomys
  - †Hesperolagomys galbreathi
- †Hessolestes
  - †Hessolestes ultimus – type locality for species
- †Heteraletes
  - †Heteraletes leotanus
- †Hoplochelys
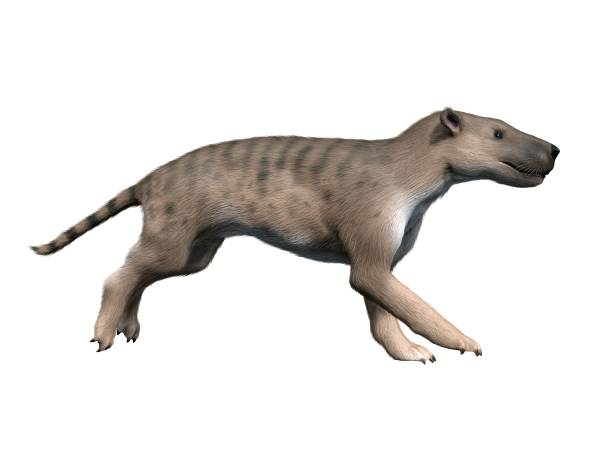
- Life restoration of the Eocene-Miocene creodont mammal Hyaenodon
  †Hyaenodon
  - †Hyaenodon vetus – or unidentified comparable form
- Hydrobia – or unidentified comparable form
- †Hylobius
  - †Hylobius deleticius – type locality for species
- †Hylomeryx
  - †Hylomeryx annectens
  - †Hylomeryx quadricuspis – type locality for species
- †Hyopsodus
  - †Hyopsodus minusculus
  - †Hyopsodus paulus
  - †Hyopsodus uintensis – type locality for species
- †Hypohippus
- †Hypolagus
  - †Hypolagus vetus
- †Hyrachyus
  - †Hyrachyus eximius
  - †Hyrachyus modestus
- †Hyracodon
  - †Hyracodon medius
- †Hyracotherium
  - †Hyracotherium vasacciense

== I ==
- †Isectolophus – type locality for genus
  - †Isectolophus annectens – type locality for species

== J ==
- †Janimus
  - †Janimus rhinophilus – type locality for species

== K ==
- †Kimbetohia
  - †Kimbetohia campi

== L ==
- Laccophilus
- †Lambdotherium
- †Lasioptera
  - †Lasioptera recessa – type locality for species
- †Leistotrophus
  - †Leistotrophus patriarchicus – type locality for species
- Lemmiscus
  - †Lemmiscus curtatus
- Lepisosteus
  - †Lepisosteus simplex
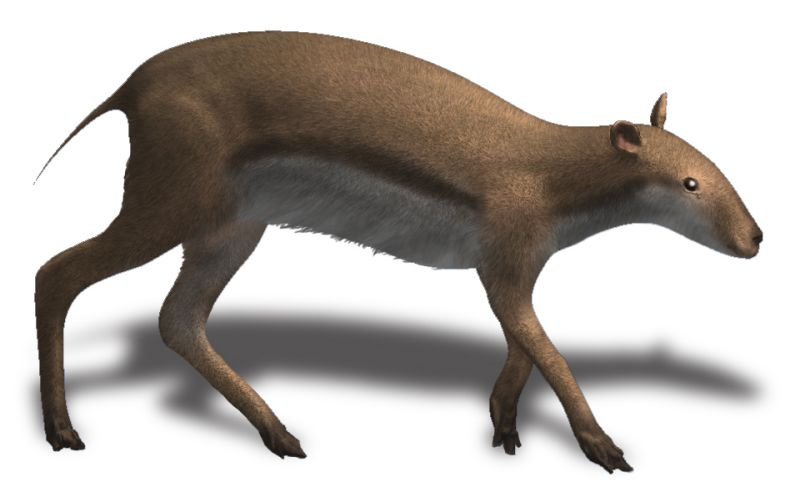
- Life restoration of the Eocene-Oligocene even-toed ungulate Leptomeryx
  †Leptomeryx
- †Leptoreodon
  - †Leptoreodon marshi
- †Leptotragulus
  - †Leptotragulus clarki
  - †Leptotragulus medius – type locality for species
  - †Leptotragulus proavus
- Lepus
  - †Lepus townsendii – or unidentified comparable form
- †Limalophus
  - †Limalophus compositus
  - †Limalophus receptus – type locality for species
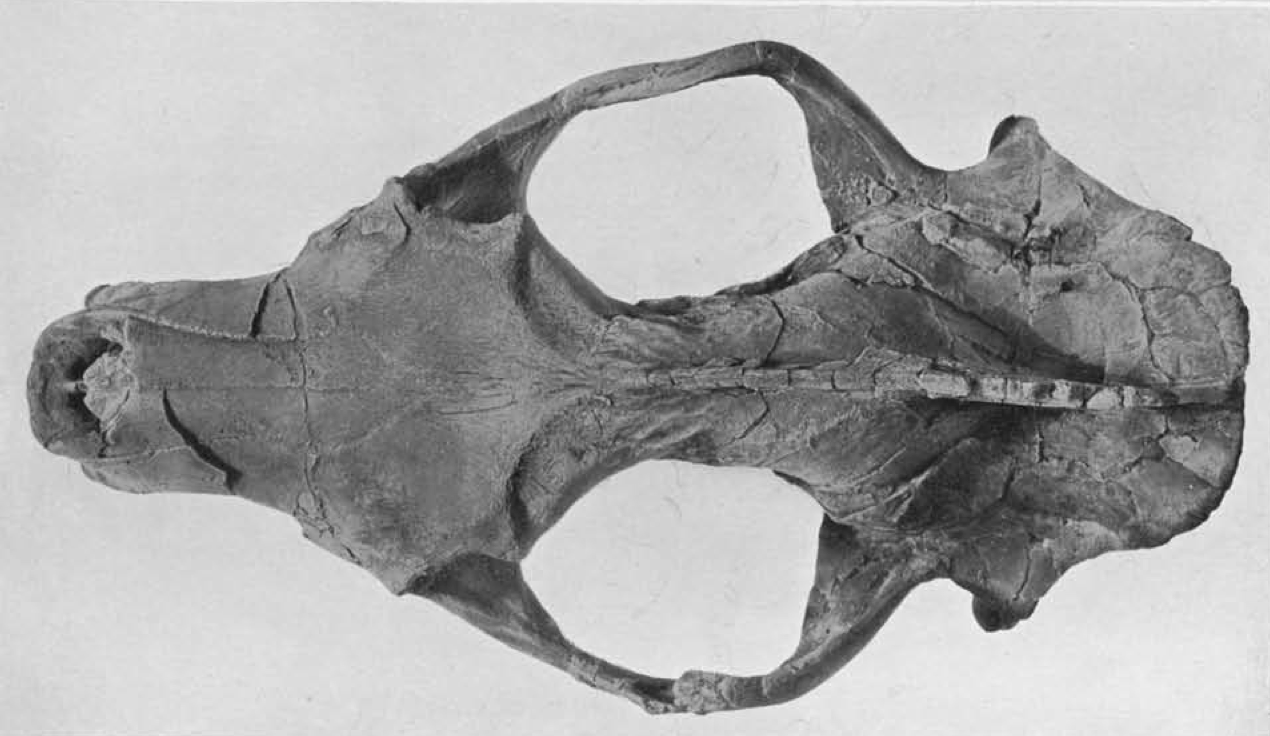
- Top view of a fossilized skull of the Eocene creodont mammal Limnocyon
  †Limnocyon
  - †Limnocyon potens
  - †Limnocyon verus – or unidentified comparable form
- †Liodontia
- †Lioplacoides – or unidentified comparable form
- †Litaletes
  - †Litaletes gazini
- †Lithadothrips – type locality for genus
  - †Lithadothrips vetusta – type locality for species
- †Loxolophus
  - †Loxolophus pentacus
  - †Loxolophus spiekeri
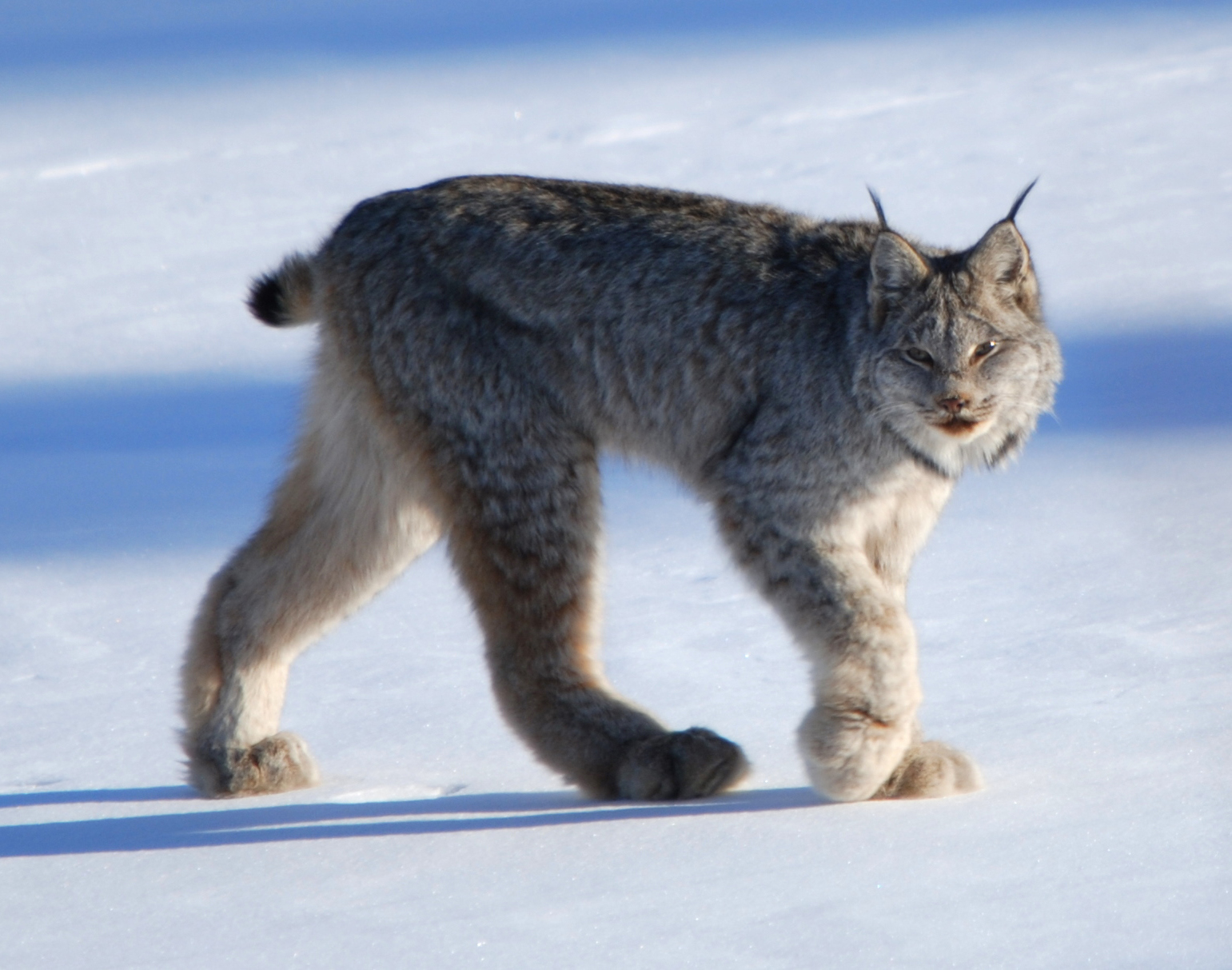
- A living Lynx
  Lynx
  - †Lynx canadensis – or unidentified comparable form

== M ==
- †Macrotarsius
  - †Macrotarsius jepseni – type locality for species
- †Mammut
  - †Mammut americanum
- †Mammuthus
  - †Mammuthus columbi
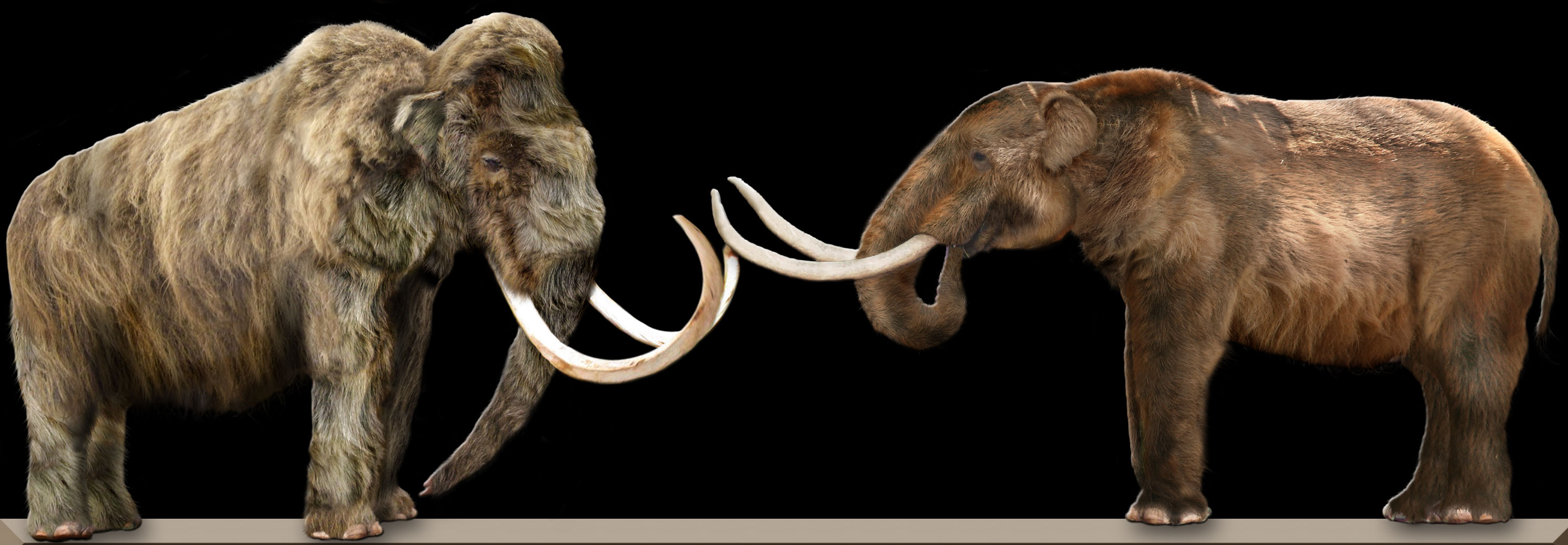
  - Life restorations of a Mammut americanum, or American mastodon (right), and a Mammuthus primigenius, or wooly mammoth (left)
    †Mammuthus primigenius
- Marsilea
  - †Marsilea sprungerorum
- †Megalamynodon
  - †Megalamynodon regalis – type locality for species
- †Megalonyx
  - †Megalonyx jeffersonii
- †Menops
  - †Menops marshi
- †Merriamoceros
- †Mesomeryx – type locality for genus
  - †Mesomeryx grangeri – type locality for species
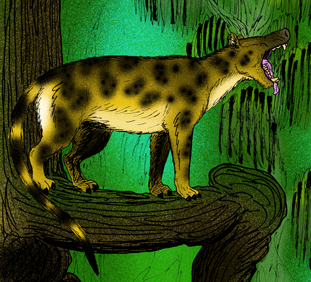
- Life restoration of the Eocene mammal Mesonyx
  †Mesonyx
  - †Mesonyx obtusidens
- †Metaliomys – type locality for genus
  - †Metaliomys sevierensis – type locality for species
- †Metanoiamys
  - †Metanoiamys lacus
- †Metarhinus
  - †Metarhinus diploconus
  - †Metarhinus fluviatilis – type locality for species
  - †Metarhinus parvus
- †Metatelmatherium
  - †Metatelmatherium ultimum – type locality for species
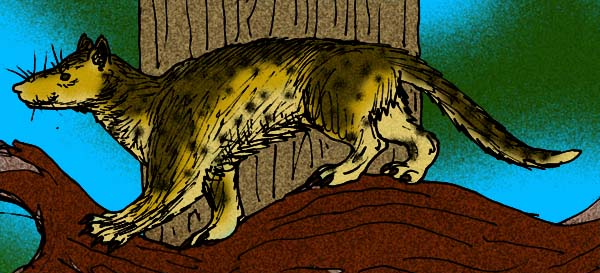
- Life restoration of the Paleocene-Eocene mammal Miacis
  †Miacis
  - †Miacis parvivorus – or unidentified comparable form
- †Microparamys
  - †Microparamys dubius
  - †Microparamys minutus
- †Micropternodus
- †Microsyops
- Microtus
  - †Microtus montanus
  - †Microtus paroperarius
- Mictomys
  - †Mictomys borealis
- †Mimomys
  - †Mimomys dakotaensis – or unidentified comparable form
- †Mimotricentes
- †Miocyon
  - †Miocyon major – or unidentified comparable form
  - †Miocyon scotti – type locality for species
  - †Miocyon vallisrubrae – type locality for species
- Mustela
  - †Mustela richardsonii – tentative report
- †Myrmecoboides
- †Mytonolagus
  - †Mytonolagus petersoni – type locality for species
- †Mytonomeryx
  - †Mytonomeryx scotti – type locality for species
- †Mytonomys
  - †Mytonomys mytonensis
  - †Mytonomys robustus – type locality for species

== N ==
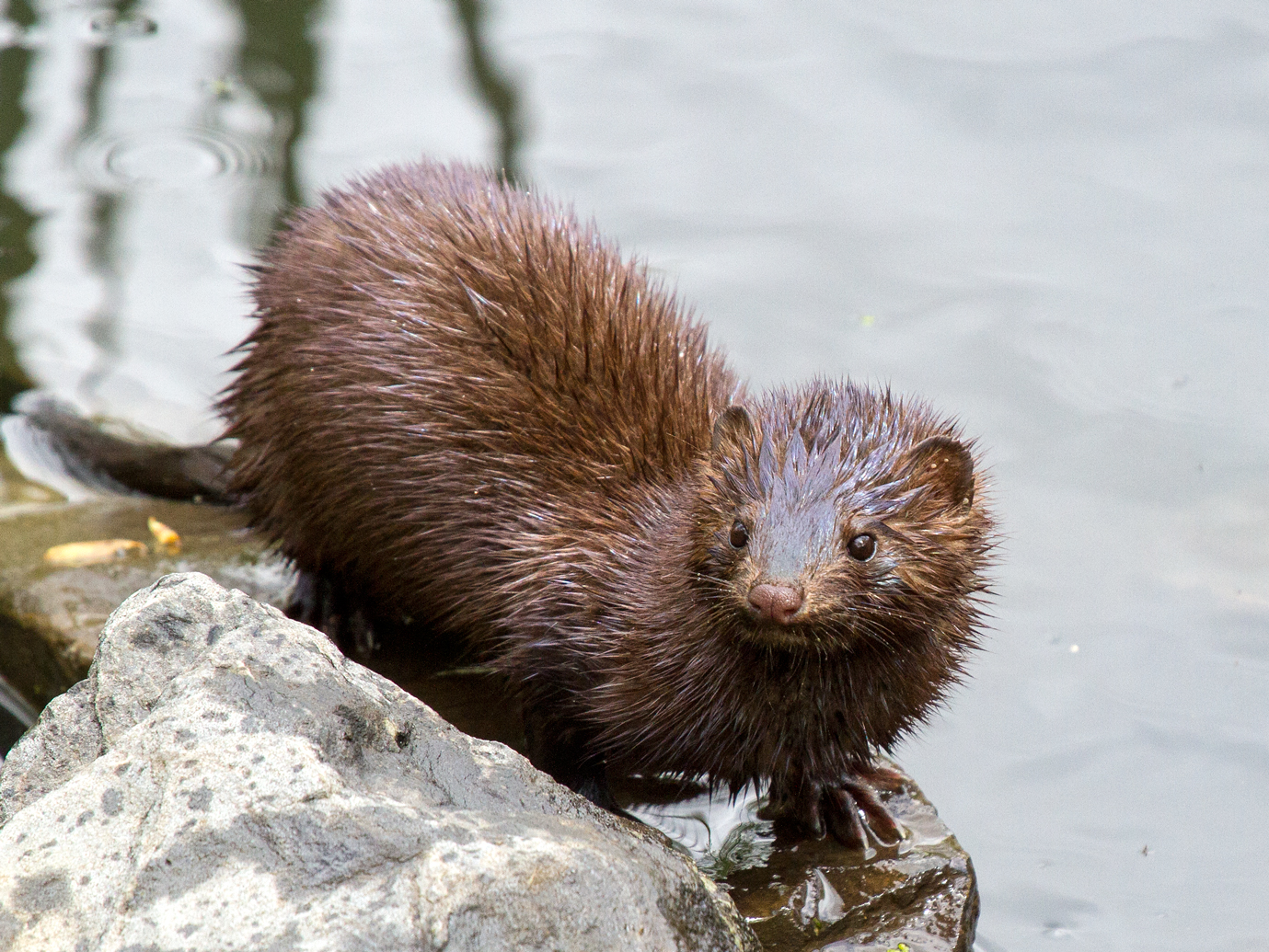
A living Neogale vison, or American mink

- †Nemotelus
  - †Nemotelus eocenicus – type locality for species
- Neogale
  - †Neogale vison
- †Neoplagiaulax
  - †Neoplagiaulax macintyrei
- Neoptochus – tentative report
- Neotamias
- Neotoma
- †Notharctus
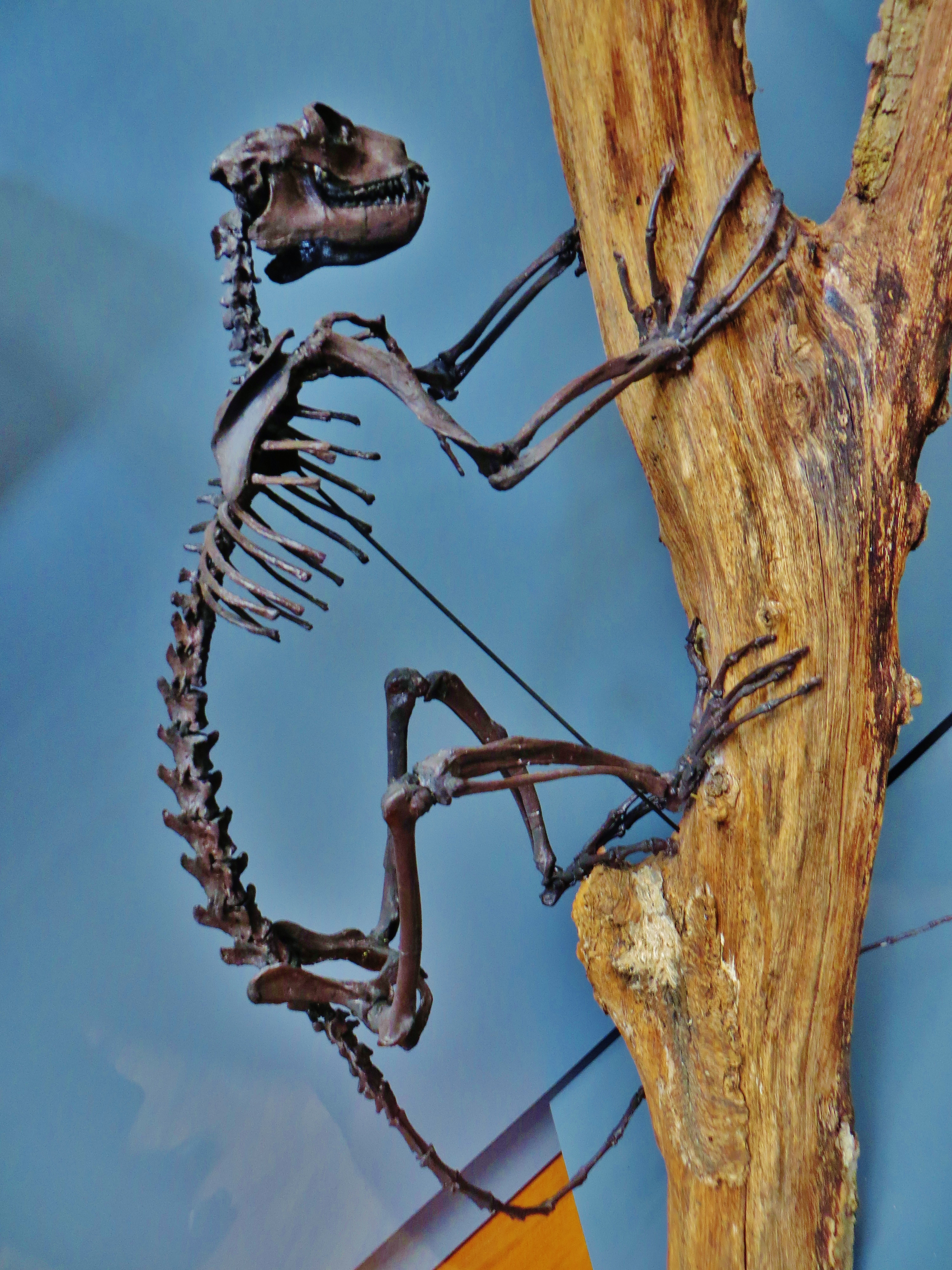
  - Mounted fossilized skeleton of the Eocene primate Notharctus tenebrosus
    †Notharctus tenebrosus – or unidentified comparable form
- †Nyctitherium
  - †Nyctitherium serotinum

== O ==
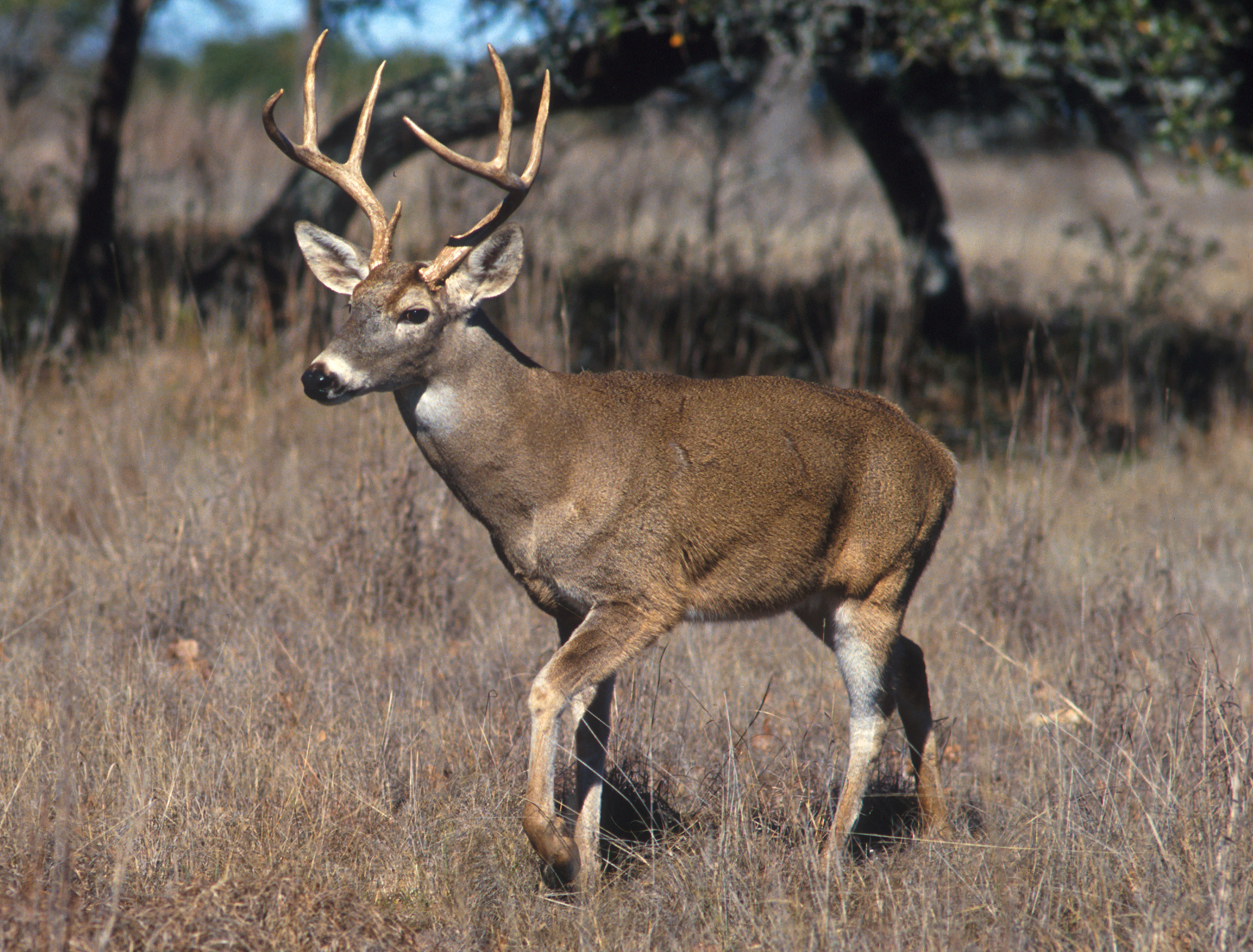
- A living Odocoileus deer
  Odocoileus
- †Oliveremys
  - †Oliveremys uintaensis
- †Omomys
  - †Omomys carteri
  - †Omomys lloydi – type locality for species
- Ondatra
- †Onychodectes
  - †Onychodectes tisonensis – or unidentified comparable form
- †Oodectes – tentative report
- Ophryastes
  - †Ophryastes petrarum
- †Ophryastites
  - †Ophryastites digressus – type locality for species
- †Orelladjidaumo – or unidentified comparable form
- †Oromeryx
  - †Oromeryx plicatus – type locality for species
- †Ourayia
  - †Ourayia hopsoni
  - †Ourayia uintensis – type locality for species
- †Oxyacodon
  - †Oxyacodon apiculatus
  - †Oxyacodon ferronensis – type locality for species
  - †Oxyacodon marshater – type locality for species
- †Oxyaenodon
  - †Oxyaenodon dysodus
- †Oxyclaenus
  - †Oxyclaenus pugnax
- †Oxygonus
  - †Oxygonus mortuus – type locality for species
- †Oxytomodon
  - †Oxytomodon perissum

== P ==
- †Pachymerus
  - †Pachymerus petrensis – type locality for species
- †Paenemarmota
  - †Paenemarmota sawrockensis
- †Palaeictops
  - †Palaeictops bridgeri
- †Palaeoeristalis – type locality for genus
  - †Palaeoeristalis tesselatus – type locality for species
- †Palaeothrips – type locality for genus
  - †Palaeothrips fossilis – type locality for species
- †Palaeoxantusia
- †Pantolestes
  - †Pantolestes longieundus – or unidentified comparable form
- †Paradjidaumo
  - †Paradjidaumo alberti – or unidentified comparable form
  - †Paradjidaumo trilophus
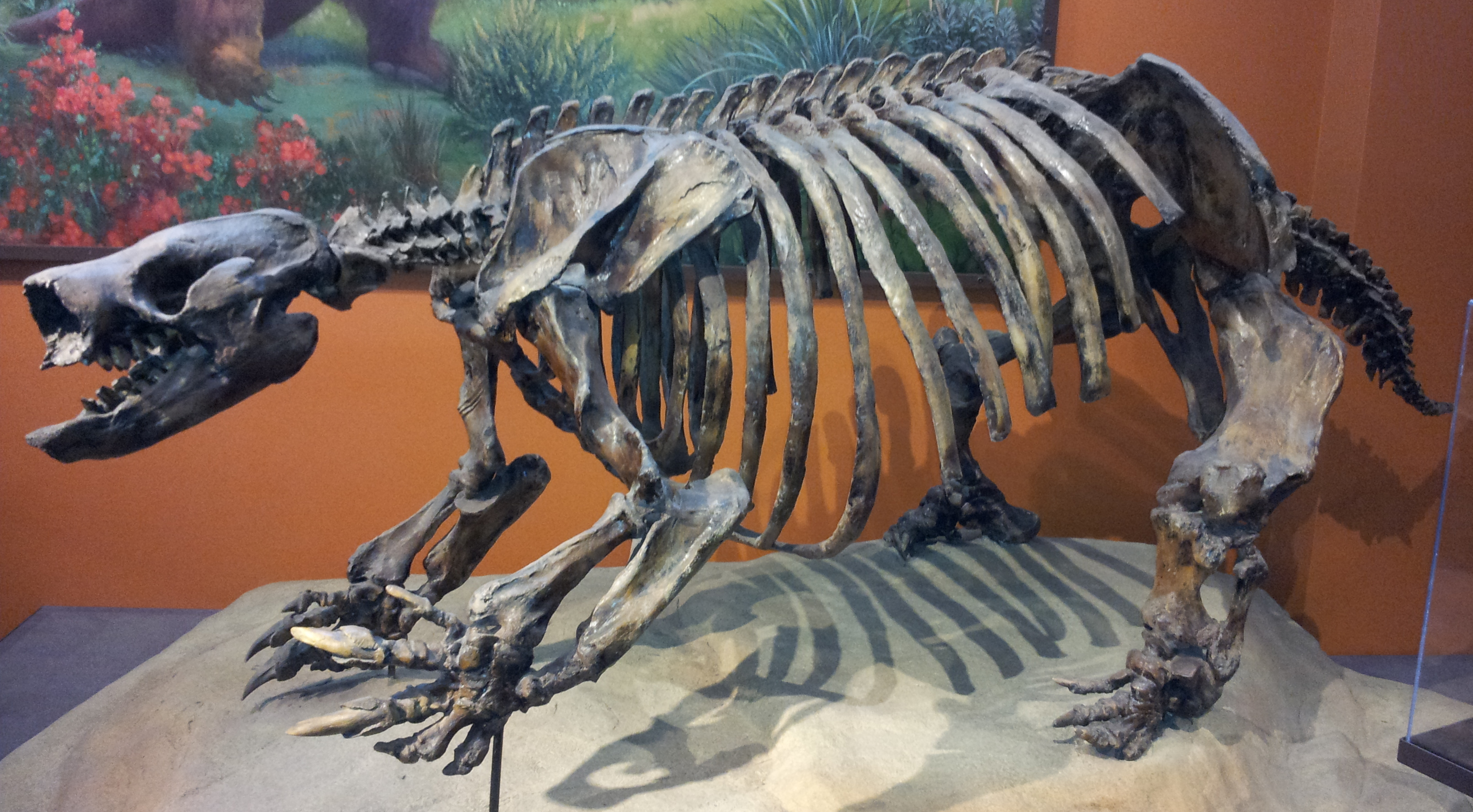
- Fossilized skeleton of the Pliocene-Pleistocene ground sloth Paramylodon
  †Paramylodon
  - †Paramylodon harlani – or unidentified comparable form
- †Paramys
  - †Paramys compressidens – type locality for species
  - †Paramys delicatus
  - †Paramys leptodus
- †Parasauromalus
  - †Parasauromalus olseni
- †Parectypodus
- †Pareumys
  - †Pareumys grangeri
  - †Pareumys guensburgi – type locality for species
  - †Pareumys milleri – type locality for species
  - †Pareumys troxelli
- †Paromomys
  - †Paromomys depressidens
- †Paronychomys
  - †Paronychomys lemredfieldi
- †Paropsocus – type locality for genus
  - †Paropsocus disjunctus – type locality for species
- †Passaliscomys – type locality for genus
  - †Passaliscomys priscus – type locality for species
- †Pauromys
- †Penetrigonias
  - †Penetrigonias dakotensis
- †Pentacemylus
  - †Pentacemylus leotensis
  - †Pentacemylus progressus – type locality for species
- †Peradectes
  - †Peradectes chesteri
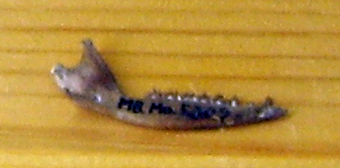
- Fossilized mandible of the Eocene-Miocene mammal Peratherium
  †Peratherium
  - †Peratherium marsupium
- †Periptychus
  - †Periptychus carinidens
  - †Periptychus coarctatus
- Peromyscus
  - †Peromyscus maniculatus
- Phenacomys
  - †Phenacomys gryci – or unidentified comparable form
  - †Phenacomys intermedius
- †Phygadeuon
  - †Phygadeuon petrifactellus – type locality for species
- Phyllobius
  - †Phyllobius avus
  - †Phyllobius carcerarius
- †Phyllophaga
  - †Phyllophaga avus – type locality for species
- Physa
- Picea
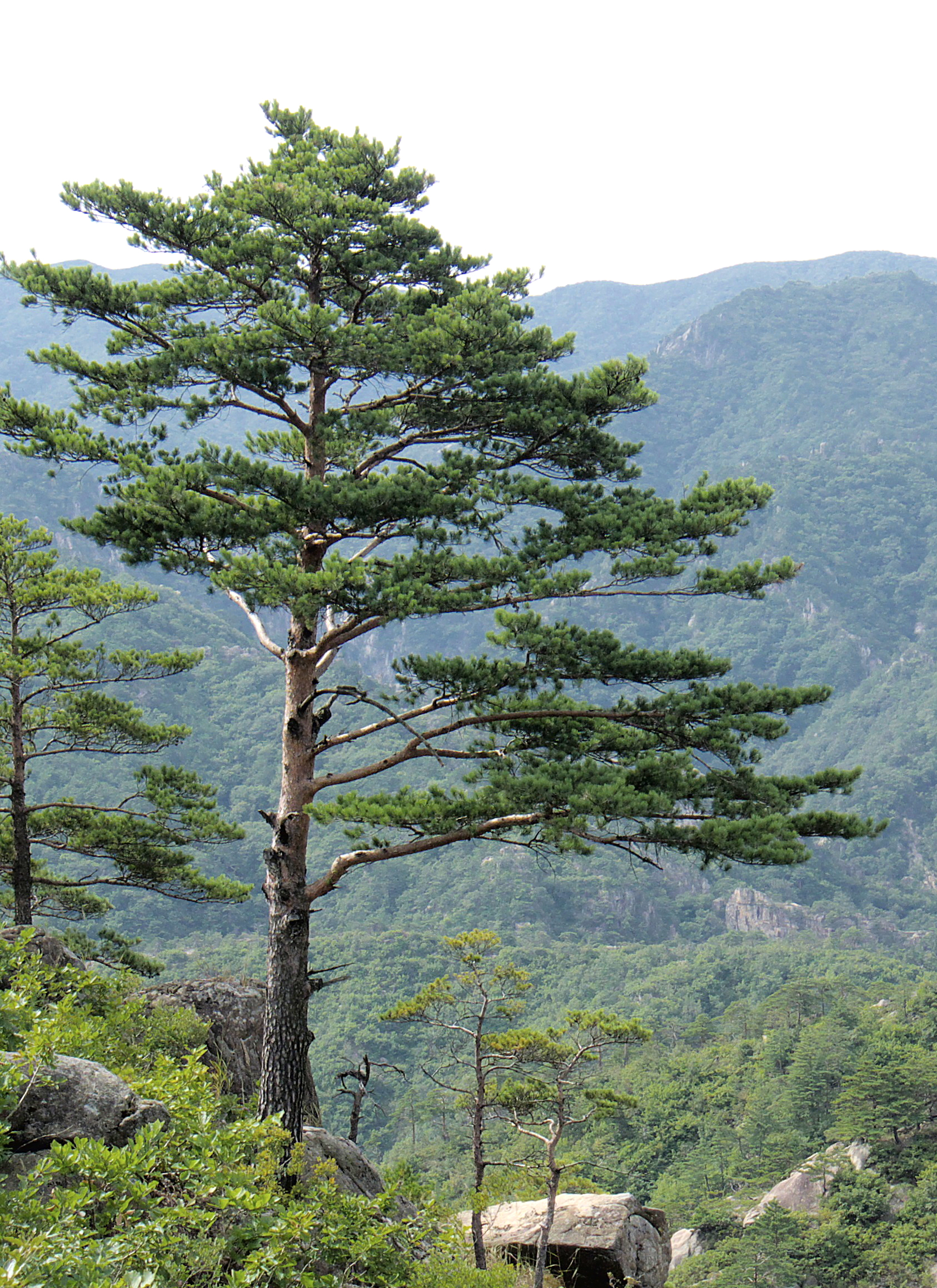
- A living Pinus, or pine tree
  Pinus
- †Plastomenoides
  - †Plastomenoides lamberti
- †Plastomenus
- Plecia
  - †Plecia woodruffi – type locality for species
- †Plesiolestes
  - †Plesiolestes nacimienti
- †Poabromylus
  - †Poabromylus kayi – type locality for species
- †Poebrodon
  - †Poebrodon kayi – type locality for species
- †Polemonium – or unidentified comparable form
- †Presbyorniformipes
  - †Presbyorniformipes feduccii – type locality for species
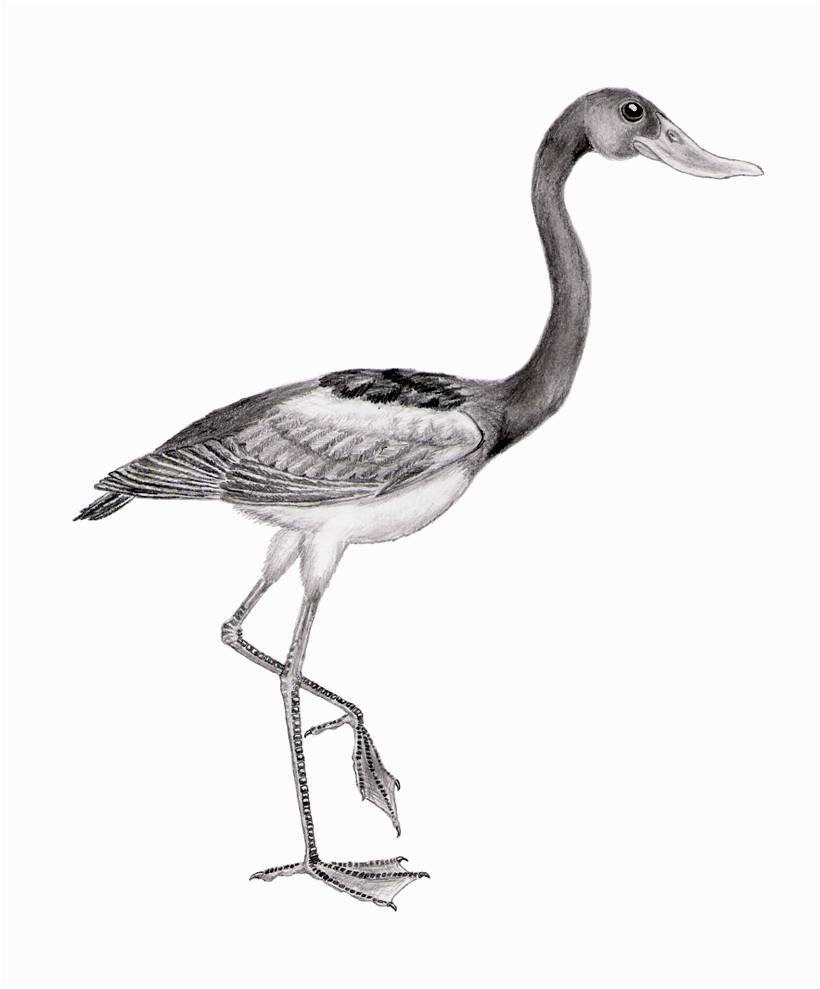
- Life restoration of the Paleocene-Eocene waterfowl Presbyornis
  †Presbyornis – type locality for genus
  - †Presbyornis pervetus – type locality for species
  - †Presbyornis recurvirostrus – type locality for species
- †Procaimanoidea – type locality for genus
  - †Procaimanoidea kayi
  - †Procaimanoidea utahensis – type locality for species
- †Procas
  - †Procas vinculatus
- †Procynodictis
  - †Procynodictis vulpiceps
- †Prodaphaenus
  - †Prodaphaenus uintensis – type locality for species
- †Promioclaenus
- †Pronophlebia – type locality for genus
  - †Pronophlebia rediviva – type locality for species
- †Propalaeosinopa – tentative report
- †Protadjidaumo
  - †Protadjidaumo typus – type locality for species
- †Protictis
  - †Protictis haydenianus
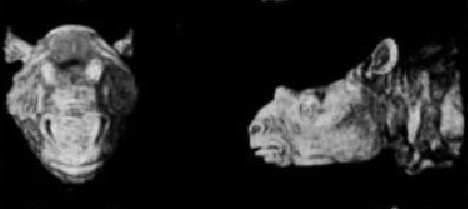
- Restorative models in multiple views of the Eocene brontothere Protitanotherium (figure 3)
  †Protitanotherium
- †Protochriacus
  - †Protochriacus simplex
- †Protoptychus
  - †Protoptychus hatcheri
- †Protoreodon
  - †Protoreodon minor – type locality for species
  - †Protoreodon parvus
  - †Protoreodon petersoni – type locality for species
  - †Protoreodon pumilus – type locality for species
- †Protoselene
  - †Protoselene griphus
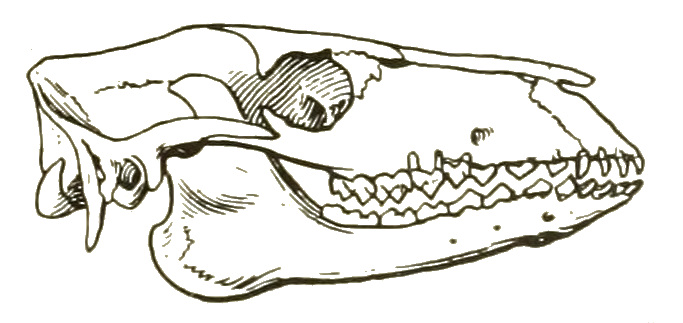
- Illustration of a fossilized skull of the Eocene camel Protylopus
  †Protylopus
  - †Protylopus annectens – type locality for species
  - †Protylopus petersoni
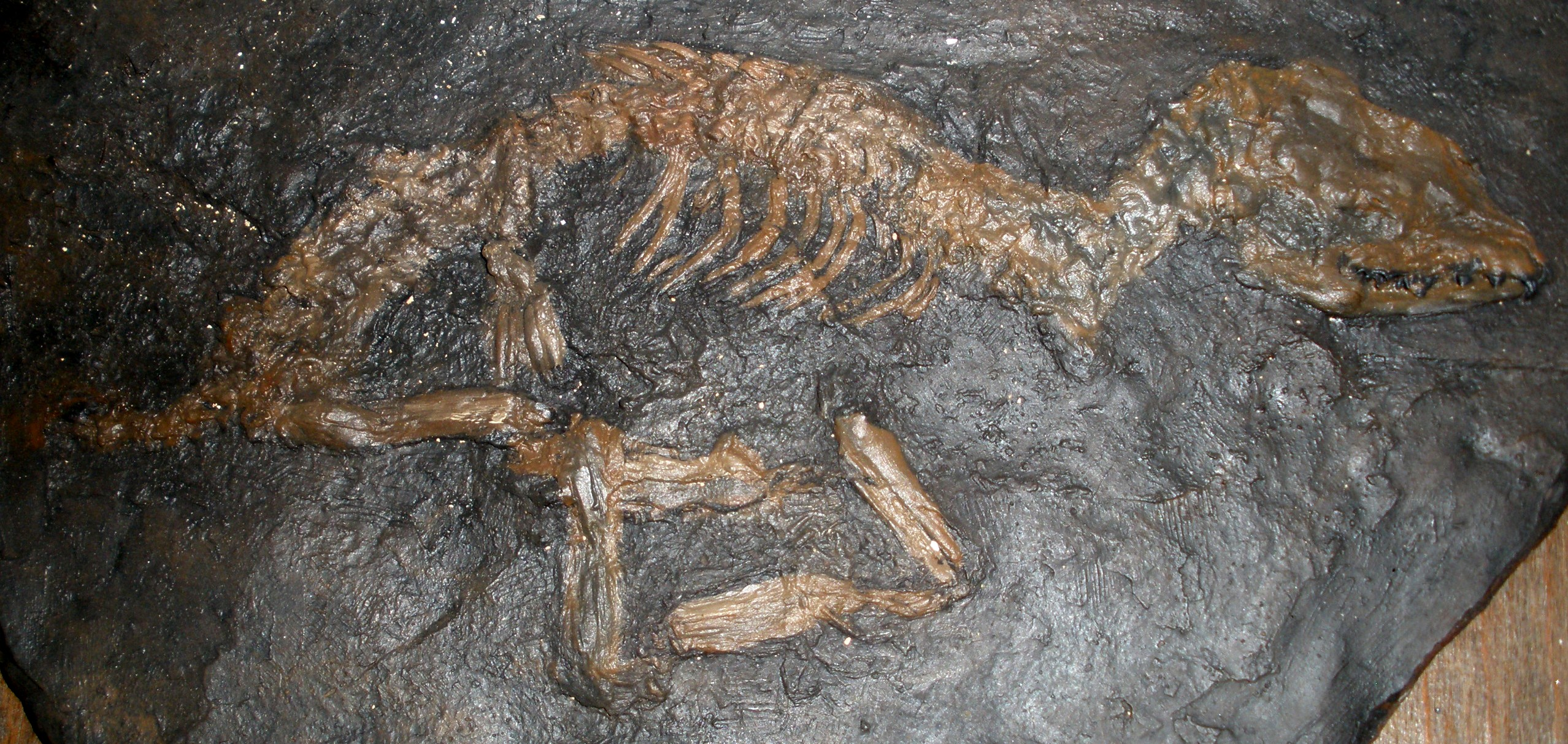
- Fossilized skeleton of the Eocene creodont mammal Proviverra
  †Proviverra
  - †Proviverra longipes
- †Proviverroides
  - †Proviverroides piercei – or unidentified comparable form
- †Proxestops – or unidentified comparable form
  - †Proxestops silberlingii
- †Pseudodiplacodon
- †Pseudosalix – type locality for genus
  - †Pseudosalix handleyi – type locality for species
- †Pseudotomus
  - †Pseudotomus eugenei – type locality for species
  - †Pseudotomus petersoni – type locality for species
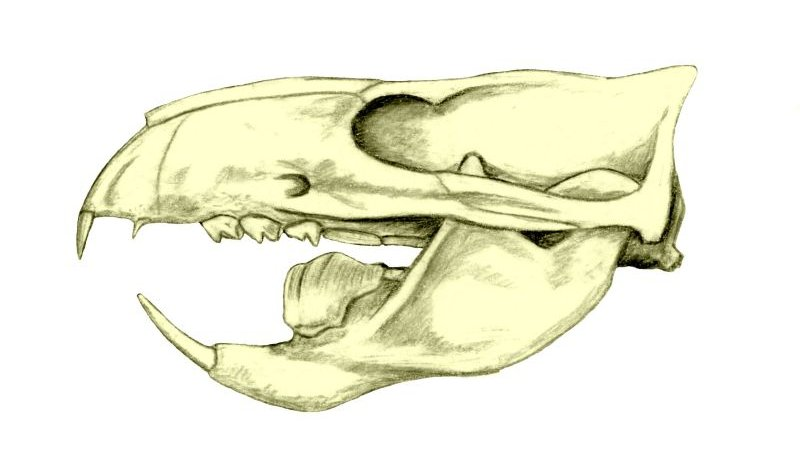
- Illustration of a fossilized skull of the Paleocene multituberculate mammal Ptilodus
  †Ptilodus
  - †Ptilodus mediaevus
  - †Ptilodus tsosiensis – or unidentified comparable form

== R ==
- †Reithroparamys
  - †Reithroparamys sciuroides – type locality for species
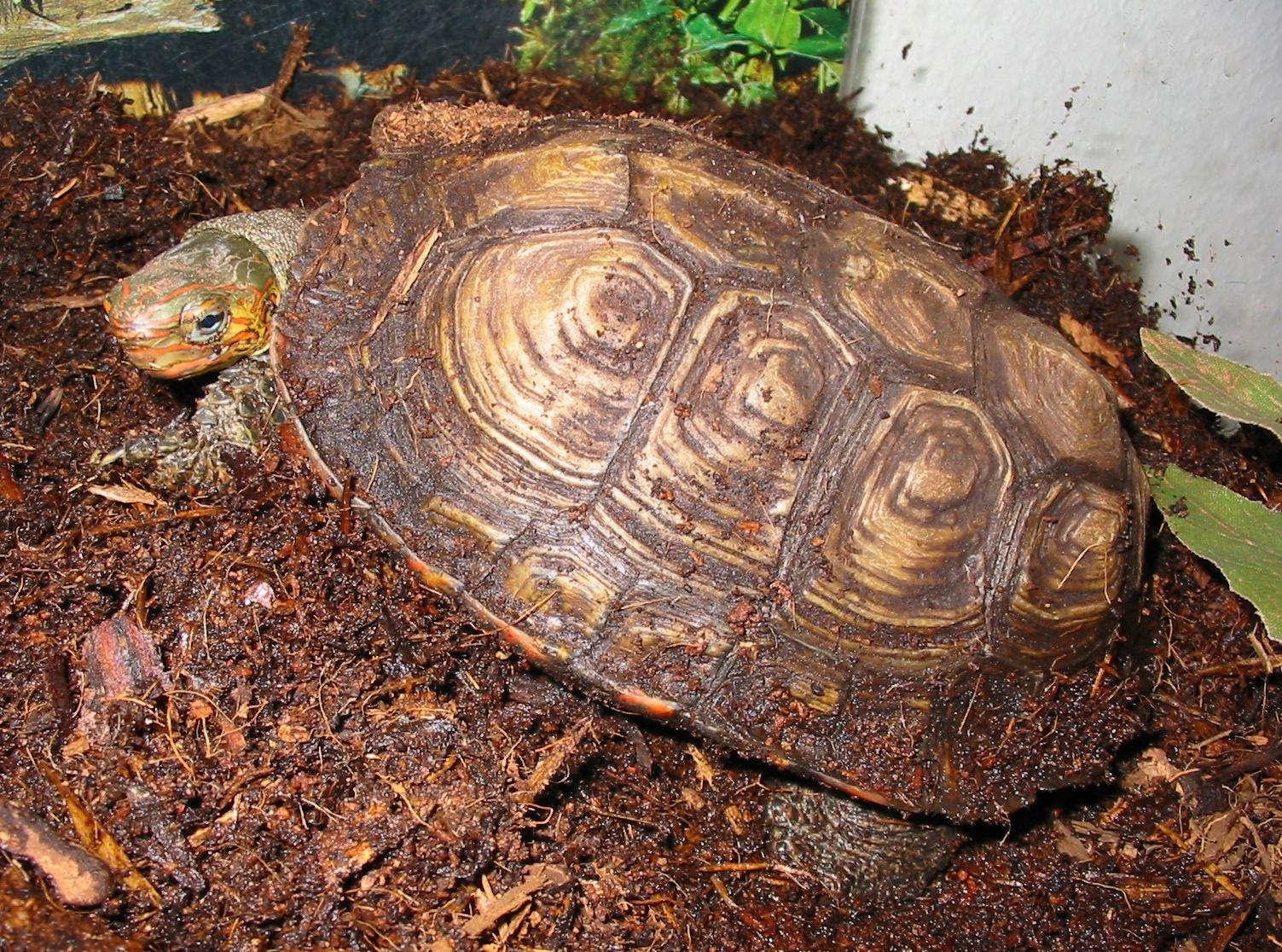
- A living Rhinoclemmys, or Neotropical wood turtle
  Rhinoclemmys – report made of unidentified related form or using admittedly obsolete nomenclature

== S ==
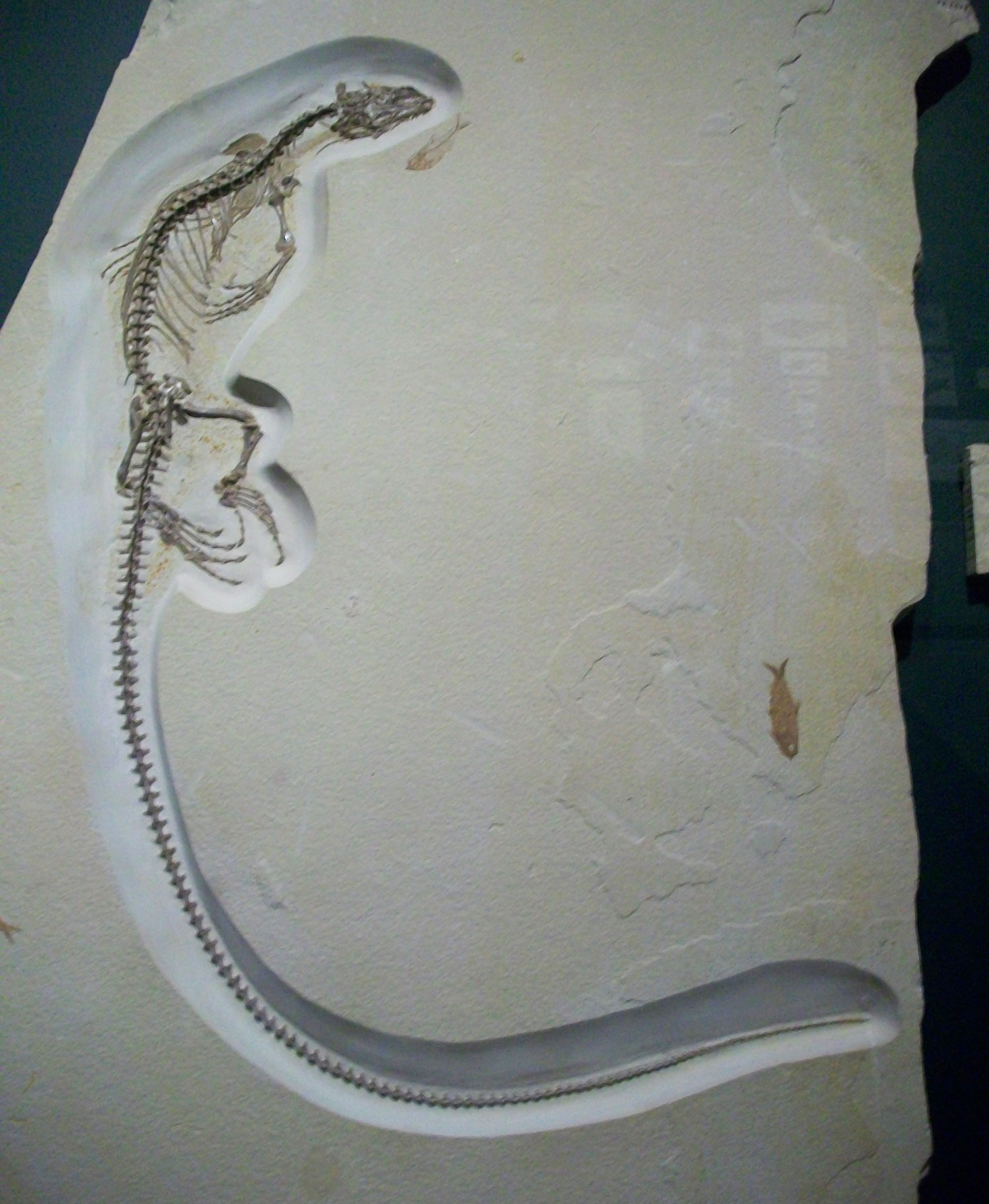
- Fossilized skeleton of the Eocene monitor lizard Saniwa
  †Saniwa
  - †Saniwa ensidens
- †Sargus
  - †Sargus vetus – type locality for species
- †Scenopagus
  - †Scenopagus edenensis
  - †Scenopagus priscus
- †Sciuravus
  - †Sciuravus altidens – type locality for species
  - †Sciuravus eucristadens
  - †Sciuravus popi – type locality for species
- †Simidectes – type locality for genus
  - †Simidectes magnus – type locality for species
  - †Simidectes medius – type locality for species
- †Simimeryx
  - †Simimeryx minutus
- †Simimys – or unidentified comparable form
- †Sinopa
  - †Sinopa agilis
  - †Sinopa major
  - †Sinopa rapax
- †Smilodectes
  - †Smilodectes gracilis
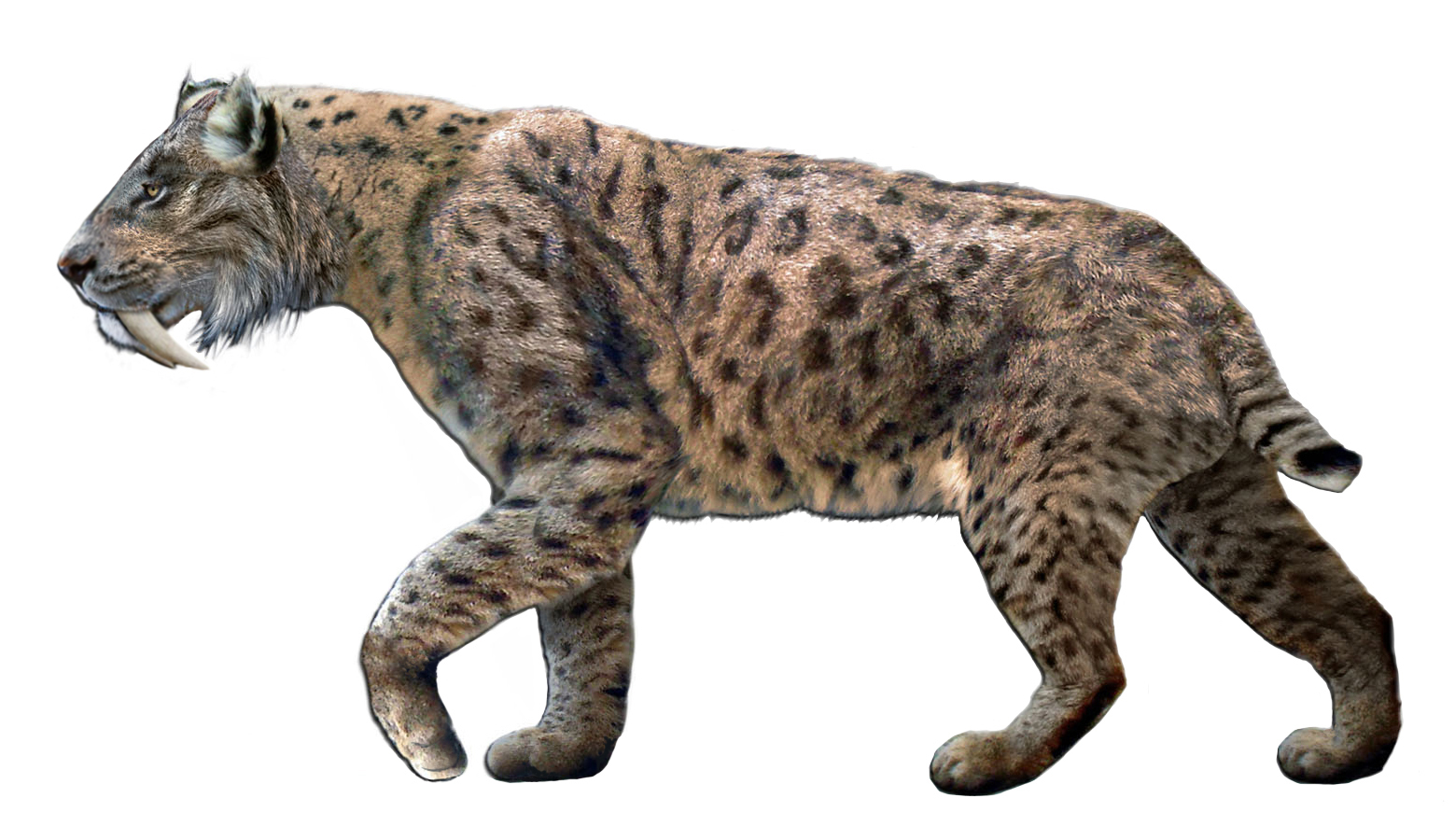
- Life restoration of the Pleistocene-Holocene saber-tooth cat Smilodon
  †Smilodon
  - †Smilodon fatalis – or unidentified comparable form
- Sorex
  - †Sorex palustris
- Spermophilus
  - †Spermophilus armatus – or unidentified comparable form
- †Sphenocoelus
  - †Sphenocoelus hyognathus
- †Sthenodectes
  - †Sthenodectes incisivum – type locality for species
- †Stygimys
  - †Stygimys kuszmauli
- †Stylemys
  - †Stylemys uintensis – type locality for species
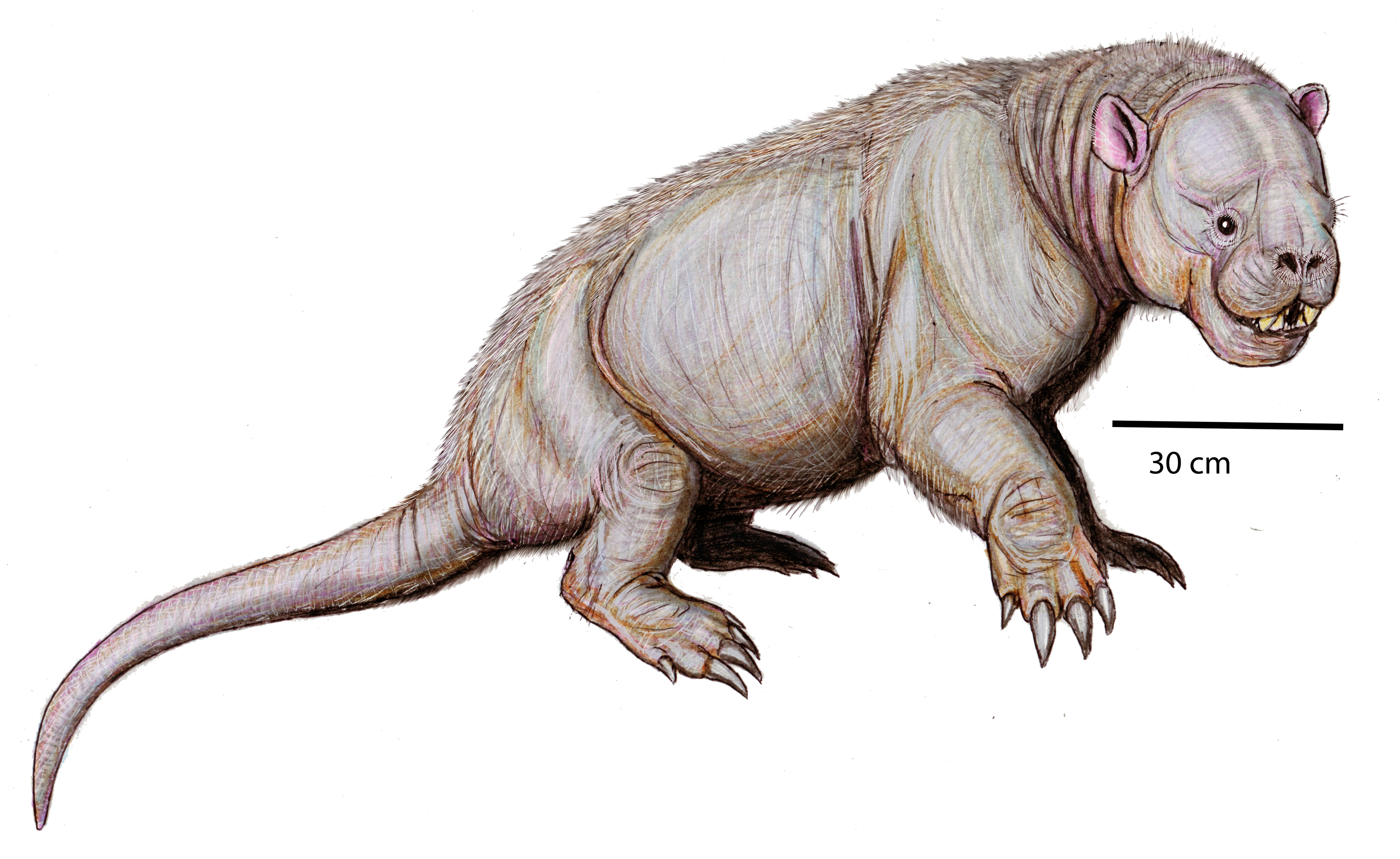
- Life restoration of the Eocene taeniodont mammal Stylinodon mirus
  †Stylinodon
  - †Stylinodon mirus
- †Syntomostylus
  - †Syntomostylus rudis

== T ==
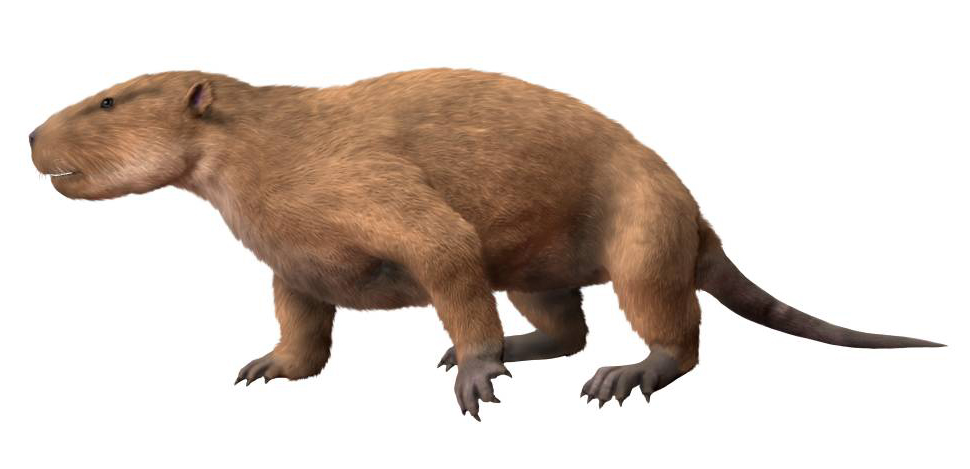
- Restoration of the Paleocene multituberculate mammal Taeniolabis
  †Taeniolabis
  - †Taeniolabis taoensis
- †Talpavus
  - †Talpavus duplus – type locality for species
  - †Talpavus nitidus
- †Tapocyon
  - †Tapocyon robustus
- Taxidea
  - †Taxidea taxus
- †Thisbemys
  - †Thisbemys medius
  - †Thisbemys uintensis – type locality for species
- Thomomys
  - †Thomomys talpoides
- †Tilgidopsis – type locality for genus
  - †Tilgidopsis haesitans – type locality for species
- Tinosaurus
  - †Tinosaurus stenodon
- †Tricentes
  - †Tricentes subtrigonus – type locality for species
- †Triplopus
  - †Triplopus implicatus
  - †Triplopus obliquidens
  - †Triplopus rhinocerinus – type locality for species
- †Trogosus
- †Tylocephalonyx

== U ==
- †Uintaceras
  - †Uintaceras radinskyi – type locality for species
- †Uintacyon
  - †Uintacyon acutus – type locality for species
- †Uintanius
  - †Uintanius ameghini
- †Uintasorex
  - †Uintasorex parvulus – or unidentified comparable form
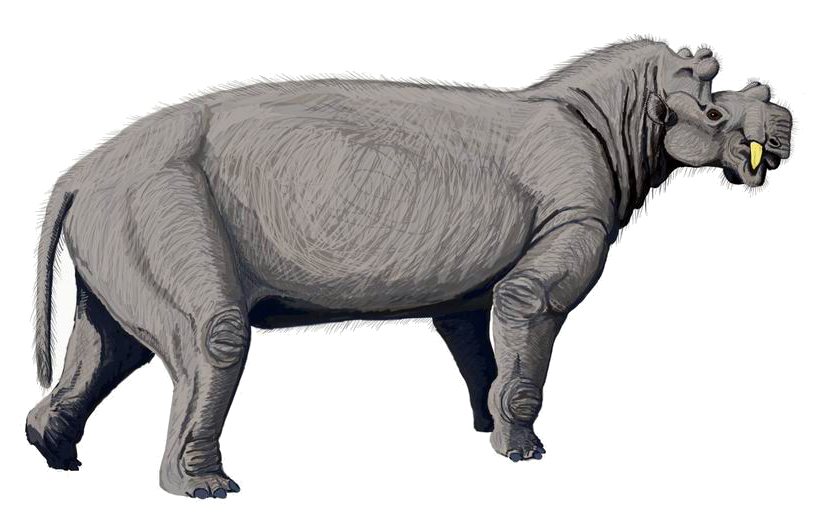
- Life restoration of the Eocene mammal Uintatherium
  †Uintatherium
- †Utahia
  - †Utahia kayi – type locality for species

== V ==
- †Valenia
  - †Valenia wilsoni
- †Viverravus
  - †Viverravus gracilis
  - †Viverravus minutus
  - †Viverravus sicarius
- Viviparus
- Vulpes
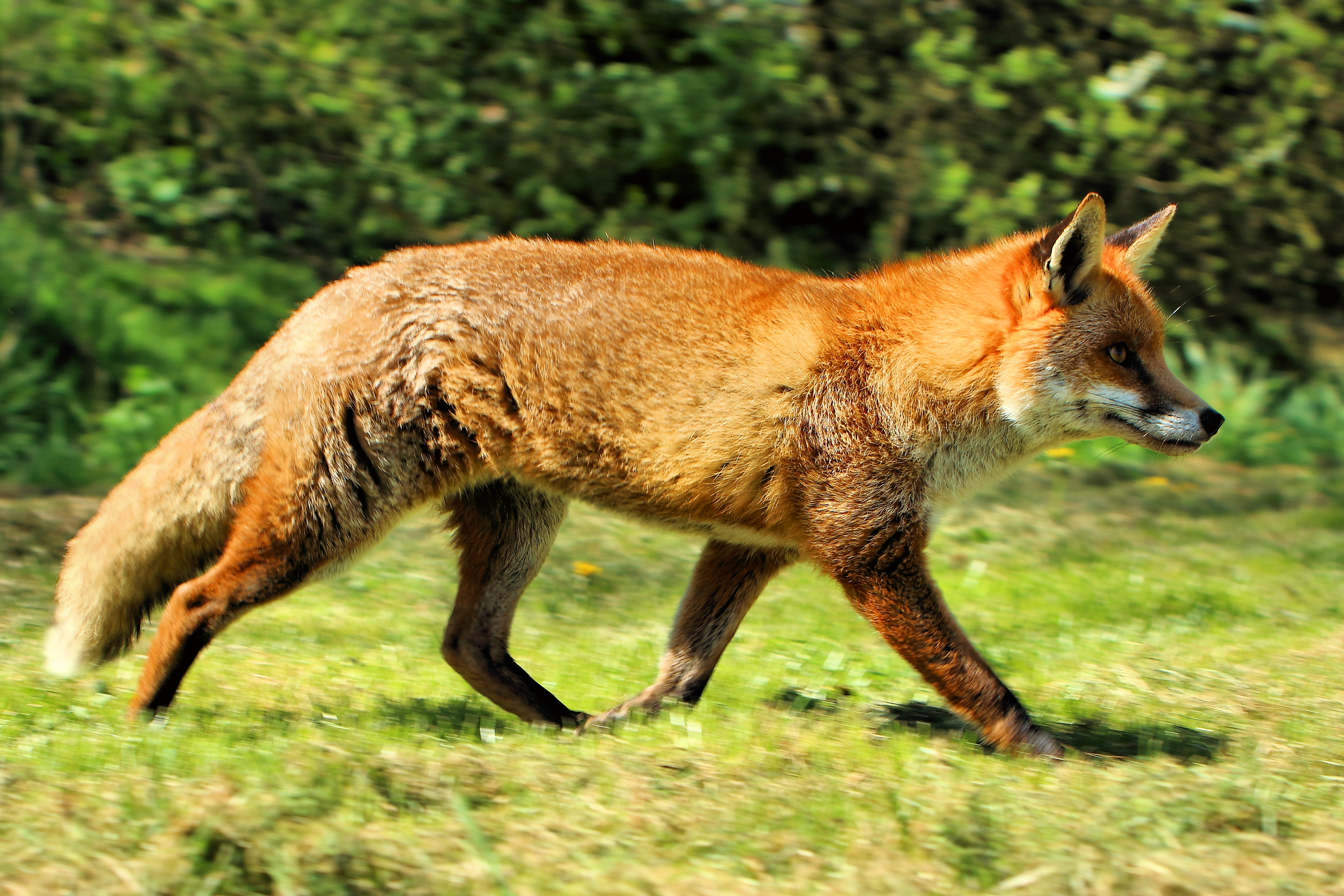
  - A living Vulpes vulpes, or red fox
    †Vulpes vulpes

== X ==
- †Xestops
  - †Xestops vagans
- †Xylotosyrphus – type locality for genus
  - †Xylotosyrphus pulchrafenestra – type locality for species

== Z ==
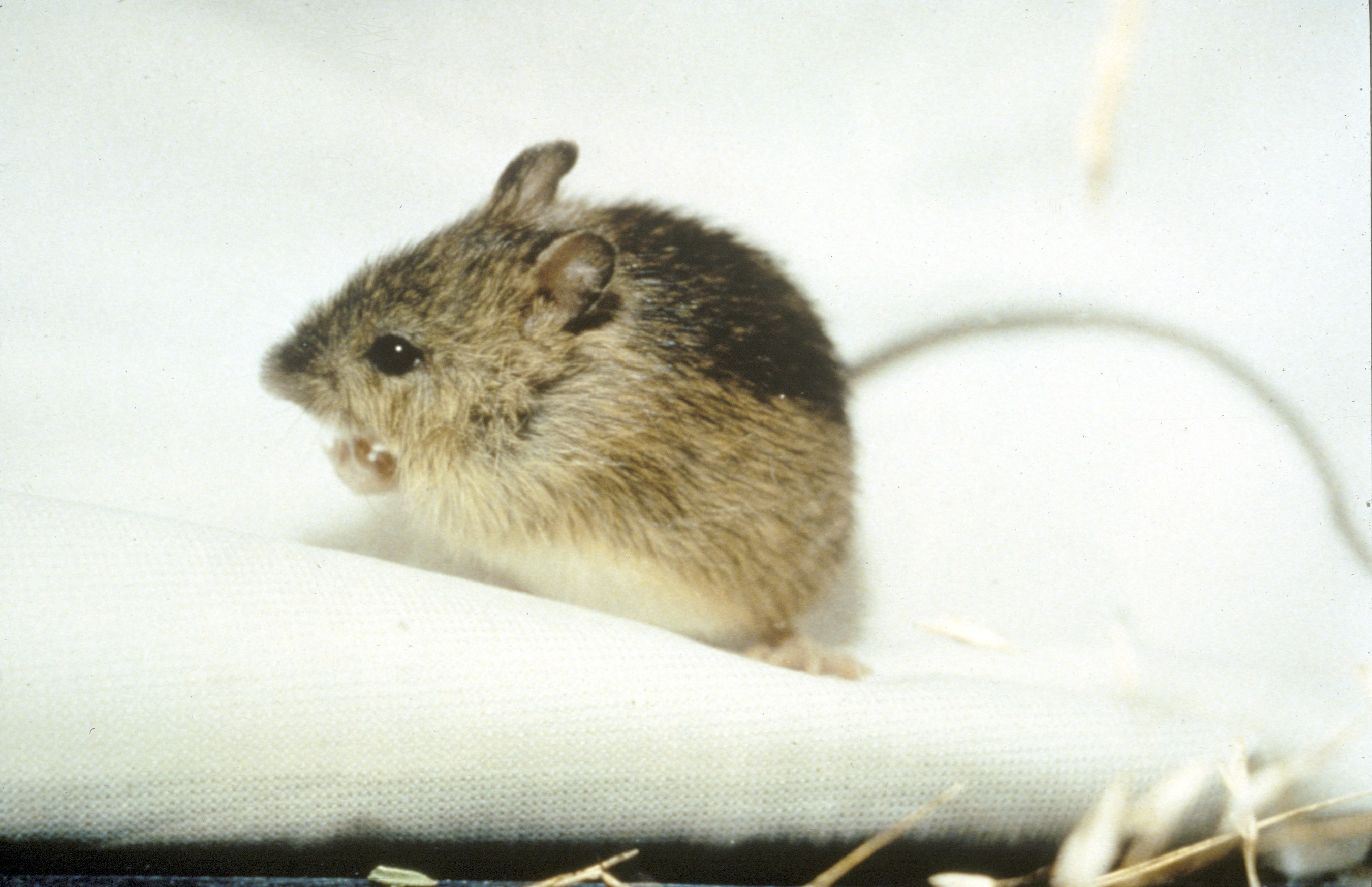
- A living Zapus jumping mouse
  Zapus
- †Zionodon – type locality for genus
  - †Zionodon satanus – type locality for species
  - †Zionodon walshi – type locality for species
