= Omomyinae =

Omomyinae Temporal range: Eocene–Oligocene
- 1, Reconstructed skeleton of Omomys carteri, shaded elements are known for Omomys carteri (Anemone & Covert, 2000); 2, artist reconstruction of Omomys carteri, based on known skeletal elements and newly discovered skull

Scientific classification
- Kingdom: Animalia
- Phylum: Chordata
- Class: Mammalia
- Order: Primates
- Family: †Omomyidae
- Subfamily: †Omomyinae (Trouessart,1879)

Genera
- See text

Extinct subfamily of primates

Omomyinae is a subfamily of the extinct primate family Omomyidae. The group is most commonly found in North America. Members of this group are suggested to have primarily been faunivores, but also including herbivorous (folivorous and frugivorous) taxa. Their body masses are estimated to have reached up to 3 kilograms (6.6 lb) in the largest genera, considerably larger than the largest anaptomorphine omomyids. The postcranial morphology of the omomyines Ourayia and Chipetaia is similar to that of primitive omomyids.

== Classification ==
Omomyinae as a monophyletic clade has been questioned in the past, but the grouping is still widely used.

- Subfamily Omomyinae
  - Brontomomys
  - Diablomomys
  - Ekwiiyemakius
  - Gunnelltarsius
  - Huerfanius
  - Mytonius
  - Palaeacodon
  - Tribe Rooneyini
    - Rooneyia
  - Tribe Steiniini
    - Steinius
  - Tribe Uintaniini
    - Uintanius
  - Tribe Hemiacodontini
    - Hemiacodon
  - Tribe Omomyini
    - Chumachius
    - Omomys
    - Saskomomys
  - Tribe Macrotarsiini
    - Yaquius
    - Macrotarsius
  - Tribe Washakiini
    - Loveina
    - Shoshonius
    - Washakius
    - Dyseolemur
  - Tribe Utahiini
    - Asiomomys
    - Utahia
    - Stockia
    - Chipetaia
    - Ourayia
    - Wyomomys
    - Ageitodendron
