= Rooneyia =

Rooneyia Temporal range: 35 Ma Late Eocene

Scientific classification
- Kingdom: Animalia
- Phylum: Chordata
- Class: Mammalia
- Order: Primates
- Family: †Omomyidae
- Subfamily: †Omomyinae
- Tribe: †Rooneyini
- Genus: †Rooneyia; Wilson, 1966
- Species: †R. viejaensis

Binomial name
- †Rooneyia viejaensis Wilson, 1966

Extinct genus of primates

Rooneyia viejaensis is a relatively small primate belonging to the extinct monotypic genus Rooneyia. Rooneyia viejaensis is known from the North American Eocene of the Sierra Vieja of Texas' Trans-Pecos region; the species is only known from the type specimen (TMM 40688-7). The lack of additional fossils at this time makes it difficult to hypothesize where and how Rooneyia may have evolved. The minimal wear upon the molar teeth of the specimen has led to the assumption that the type specimen is that of a young adult. Rooneyia does not consistently fall within any one group of fossil or extant primates.

== Taxonomy ==
Rooneyia is often referred to as enigmatic and does not seem to be closely related to most of the Eocene primates from the Rocky Mountain Region. There is disagreement into which suborder Rooneyia should be placed. Debate exists as to whether Rooneyia is

1. a stem tarsiiform to be grouped with omomyoids (F.S. Szalay)
2. a stem haplorrhine (C. Ross)
3. a stem strepsirrhine (R.F. Kay)
4. a stem anthropoid (A.L. Rosenberger).

Primates Rooneyia has been compared to include: Microcebus, Galago, Tetonius, and Necrolemur.

== History of discovery ==
The sole Rooneyia specimen was found at the Duchesnean Rifle Range Hollow locality in the Chambers Tuff Formation in 1964 by John A. Wilson. The skull TxVP 40688-7 is the holotype specimen for the genus, and is housed in the Texas Vertebrate Paleontology Collections, at the Jackson School Museum of Earth History, The University of Texas at Austin.

== Morphology ==
The type specimen is relatively intact, missing only the premaxillae, post orbital bars, zygomatic arches, and portions of the neurocranium. The natural endocast of the braincase is largely undistorted as well. While only the skull of Rooneyia has been recovered, much can be learned. Rooneyia viejaensis preserves a funnel-shaped orbital fossa deeply recessed below the forebrain; located posteriorly in the face near the craniofacial junction. Rooneyia’s orbits are highly convergent and forward facing. The frontal bone is relatively large in size with a fused metopic suture that extends like a roof above the orbit. The exterior surface of the frontal lacks any indication of longitudinal ridge or sagittal canal. Rooneyia has a dorsoventrally and laterally extensive frontal process that forms a partial postorbital septum which implies the existence of a relatively large ascending processes of the zygomatic bone. Though the absence of the ascending process of the zygomatic makes it impossible to make an accurate reconstruction of the structure. Rooneyia is more primitive than some tarsiiforms it has been compared to, which typically had relatively small orbits. While the tip of the snout is missing from the Rooneyia fossil, based on the premolar to molar layout, it can be inferred that the dental arcade was not bell-shaped Rooneyia retains primitive features in its nasal region, but has a relatively large brain and what some have interpreted to be the beginnings of a post orbital closure.

== Paleobiology ==
Rooneyia had a body mass of about 400 grams or 0.9 pounds. The small orbit size suggests a possible diurnal activity pattern meaning they were relatively more active during the day. The morphology of the semicircular canals in Rooneyia’s inner ears suggests agile locomotor abilities similar to those of Shoshonius or Omomys. The rounded cusps on Rooneyia’s molars suggest a frugivorous diet.

== See also ==
- Darwinius
