= David Tab Rasmussen =

American biological anthropologist (1958–2014)

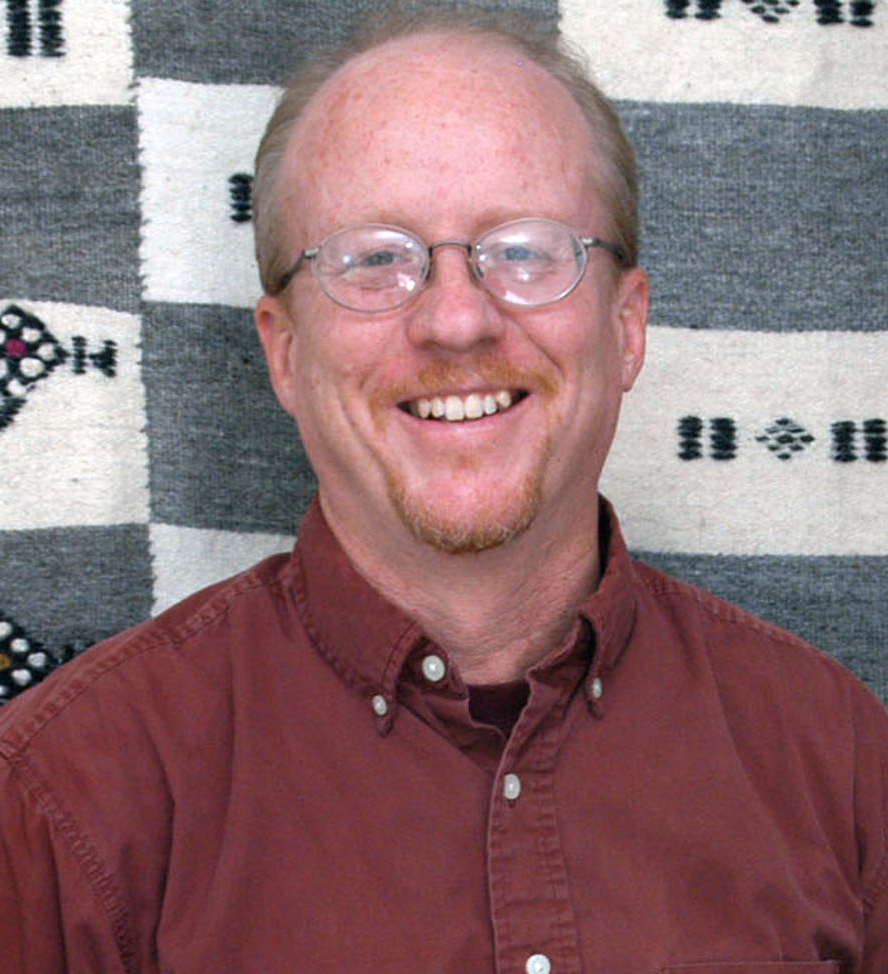
- Born: June 17, 1958; Salt Lake City, Utah, United States
- Died: August 7, 2014 (aged 56); Edwardsville, Illinois, United States
- Education: Colorado College; Duke University
- Scientific career
- Fields: Biological anthropology
- Workplaces: Rice University; University of California, Los Angeles; Washington University in St. Louis
- Doctoral advisor: Elwyn L. Simons
- Other academic advisors: Kenneth Glander
- Author abbrev. (zoology): Rasmussen

David Tab Rasmussen (June 17, 1958 – August 7, 2014), also known as D. Tab Rasmussen, was an American biological anthropologist. Specializing in both paleontology and behavioral ecology with interests in Paleogene mammals, early primate evolution, prosimians (lorises, lemurs, and tarsiers), and birds, he synthesized multiple fields of study to better understand evolutionary processes. His field research spanned the western United States as well as internationally in Africa and the Neotropics. He published over 85 research articles.

Born in Salt Lake City, Utah, in 1958, Rasmussen grew up in the Sonoran Desert, which he frequently explored as a child and young adult. After obtaining his PhD from Duke University under the guidance of Elwyn L. Simons in 1986, he went on to work at Rice University and the University of California, Los Angeles before finally settling at Washington University in St. Louis, where he spent the remainder of his career. He was active in the graduate program, serving as the director and as a member of the Graduate Council. He was recognized by students on multiple occasions for his teaching and mentoring.

== Early life and education ==
David Tab Rasmussen was born in Salt Lake City, Utah, on June 17, 1958, to Deon and David I. Rasmussen. After living briefly in Michigan and California, his family moved to Tempe, Arizona, where he grew up. Both his father and grandfather, Daniel Irvin Rasmussen were biologists. His interest in the natural world and native cultures began during his childhood with his exploration of the surrounding Sonoran Desert. Throughout his youth and early adulthood, he and his siblings freely explored the mountains and arroyos of the region. He and his family also made frequent trips to the Grand Canyon and throughout the western states.

In 1976, he graduated from McClintock High School in Tempe and went on to graduate Magna cum laude at Colorado College in 1980. With Elwyn L. Simons as his doctoral advisor, he obtained his PhD from Duke University in 1986. Kenneth Glander also acted as one of his advisors.

== Career ==
After completing his doctoral studies, Rasmussen was employed for one year as a visiting professor at Rice University and then worked as an assistant professor for the University of California, Los Angeles until 1991. That year he joined the Department of Anthropology in the Arts and Sciences at Washington University in St. Louis, and ten years later, achieved tenure as a full professor. Courses he taught at WUSTL included the history of physical anthropology and human osteology, primate biology, evolution, functional morphology, paleobiology and phylogeny. He also co-taught a course on human evolution as represented in film and culture together with a cultural anthropologist, and taught Environmental Studies starting in 1993. Rasmussen was the director of the graduate program and was a member of the Graduate Council in Arts & Sciences, both from 1993 to 1996 and 2004–2006, and was part of the university's Fulbright Committee starting in 1999.

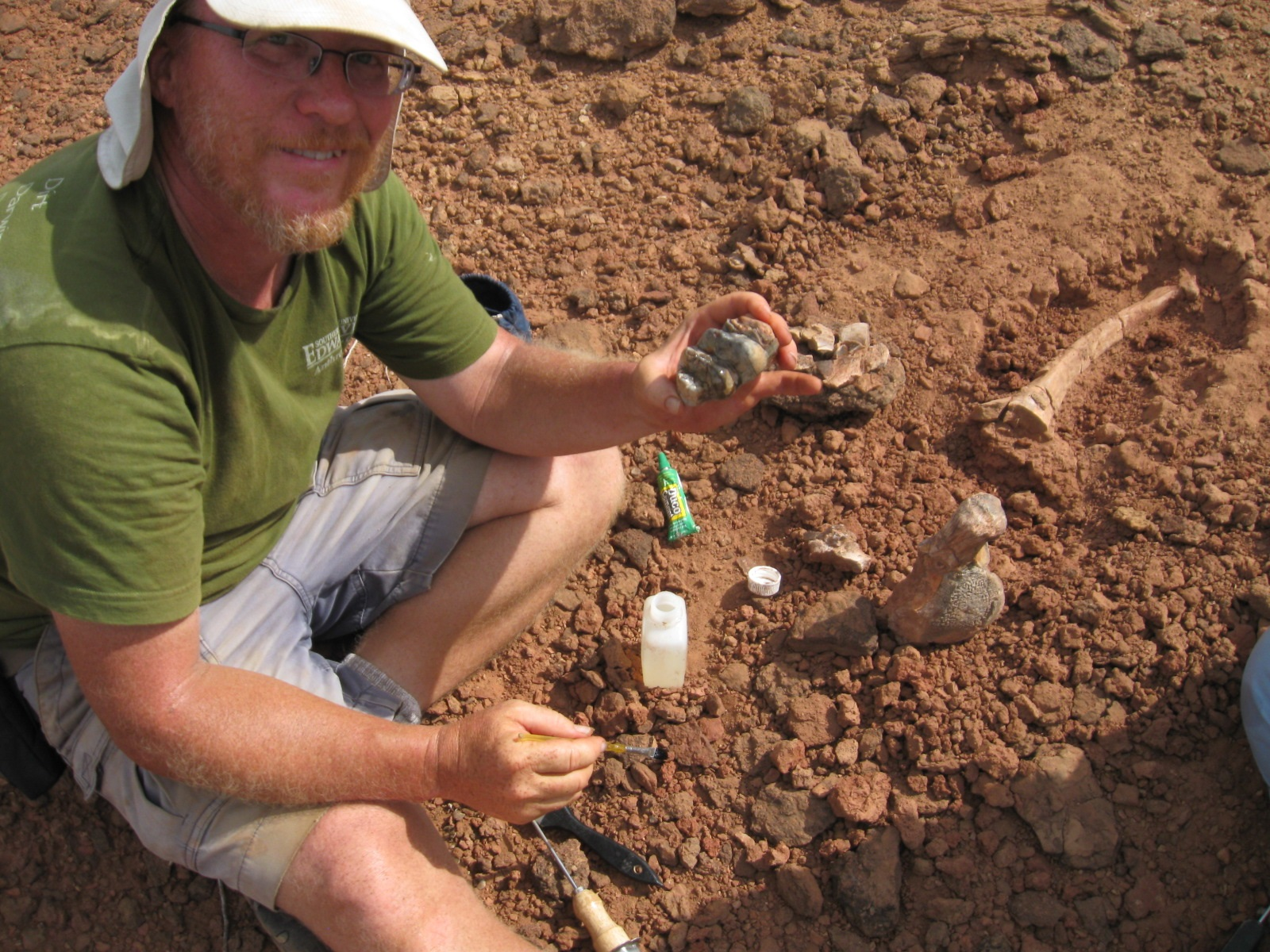
Tab Rasmussen made many fossil collecting trips, including a trip to Kenya in 2008.

Throughout his career, he traveled both locally and globally for his paleontological and archeological research. In the western United States, he visited California, Wyoming, Utah, Arizona, and New Mexico. He spent several summers with his colleague, Glenn Conroy, in the Uintah Basin of Utah searching for the fossils of early mammals. Other fossil collecting trips included locations such as Egypt, Kenya, Libya, Ethiopia, Namibia, South Africa, Madagascar, Ecuador, and Colombia. His studies of Paleogene mammals focused not only on primates, but also hyraxes and carnivorans. In addition to his studies of fossil mammals, Rasmussen studied ornithology, reporting on bird populations in Ethiopia and sea eagle populations in the Solomon Islands. He studied primates and birds in the Neotropics, and in Costa Rica and Brazil, he studied the behavior of monkeys, woolly opossums, and birds.

Rasmussen was a biological anthropologist who specialized in both paleontology and behavioral ecology. He studied primate evolution, utilizing his knowledge of both living and fossil primates. His primary research interests were the adaptive radiation of prosimian primates, particularly their life history and evolution, as well as evolutionary origins of both simians (anthropoids), and primates in general.

In 1996, he described a new genus and species of fossil primate, Chipetaia lamporea, an early tarsiiform primate from Middle Eocene found in present-day Utah. He also coauthored descriptions of the fossil primate genus Aframonius and the family Plesiopithecidae.

He wrote over 85 research articles during his career and was a doctoral advisor to nine graduate students at WUSTL.

== Honors ==
Rasmussen is commemorated in the name of the fossil mammal Widanelfarasia rasmusseni, named in 2000 in recognition of his contributions to Egyptian paleontology. During his tenure at WUSTL, he was acknowledged with the Excellence in Mentoring award twice by the Graduate Student Senate of College of Arts and Sciences. He also received the Outstanding Teaching Award and a Mortar Board Teaching Award from the student body.

Following his death in 2014, Field Projects International created a scholarship in his honor, allowing a student from a developed country to attend a field course in Tropical Biology and Primatology. A symposium in celebration of Rasmussen's influence on biological anthropology was held as a part of the 84th annual meeting of American Association of Physical Anthropologists on March 27, 2015.

== Personal life ==
Rasmussen died in his home in Edwardsville, Illinois, at the age of 56 on August 7, 2014. He was survived by his parents and three siblings, Jan, Lora, and Brian Rasmussen.
