= Ourayia =

Scientific classification
- Kingdom: Animalia
- Phylum: Chordata
- Class: Mammalia
- Order: Primates
- Suborder: Haplorhini
- Family: †Omomyidae
- Genus: †Ourayia; Gazin, 1958

Species
- O. uintensis (Osborn, 1895); O. hopsoni (Robinson, 1968)

Extinct omomyid primate

Ourayia is a genus of extinct omomyid primate from the Uinta Formation.

== Description ==
Ourayia had reduced canines and larger incisors when compared to other basal primates, like Notharctus. They also have 1 less premolar than notharctines. Compared to other omomyids from the time, Ourayia is considered large, weighing around 1,500 grams. They had enlarged orbits, like most omomyids. Some authors posit that Ourayia descended from Hemiacodon.

== Classification ==
Historically, species of Ourayia have been assigned to Mytonius and Microsyops, however they were moved to Ourayia by Charles Lewis Gazin in 1958.
