= Uintanius =

Uintanius Temporal range: Wasatchian–Wasatchian

Scientific classification
- Kingdom: Animalia
- Phylum: Chordata
- Class: Mammalia
- Order: Primates
- Suborder: Haplorhini
- Family: †Omomyidae
- Genus: †Uintanius; Matthew, 1915

Species
- U. ameghini (Wortman, 1904); U. rutherfurdi (Robinson, 1966); U. szalayi (Beard, 1987)

Synonyms
- Jemezius szalayi Huerfanius rutherfurdi

Extinct genus of omomyine primate

Uintanius is a genus of omomyine primate known from Eocene North America.

== Description ==
Uintanius has been compared to Omomys in dentition, with both genera bearing low crowned molars (a trait nearly exclusive to them among the omomyines).

== Classification ==
The positioning of Uintanius on the omomyid family tree has been contested, with some phylogenies placing the genus with the anaptomorphines, while others return it as a basal omomyine. The unique morphology of Uintanius has caused it to be grouped in the tribe Uintaniini alongside Altanius, though the nature of Altanius as an incartae sedis may bring that classification into question. Another genus of uintaniin, Jemezius, has been synonymized with Uintanius.
