= Chipetaia =

Chipetaia Temporal range: 35 Ma Middle Eocene

Scientific classification
- Domain: Eukaryota
- Kingdom: Animalia
- Phylum: Chordata
- Class: Mammalia
- Order: Primates
- Suborder: Haplorhini
- Family: †Omomyidae
- Subfamily: †Omomyinae
- Tribe: †Utahiini
- Genus: †Chipetaia; Rasmussen, 1996
- Species: †C. lamporea

Binomial name
- †Chipetaia lamporea Rasmussen, 1996

Extinct genus of primates

Chipetaia is an extinct genus of primate in the family Omomyidae, containing the sole species Chipetaia lamporea, known from the middle Eocene of North America. Described in 1996 by D. Tab Rasmussen, the species is known from fossil teeth, femur fragments and hind foot bones Estimates of life weight based on the size of teeth and leg bones range from 500 to 700 g (1.1 to 1.5 lb) to as high as 1,000 g (2.2 lb). The genus name honors the Native American Ute diplomat Chipeta, while the specific name is Greek for "of the Shining Mountains," the Ute name for the Rocky Mountains.
