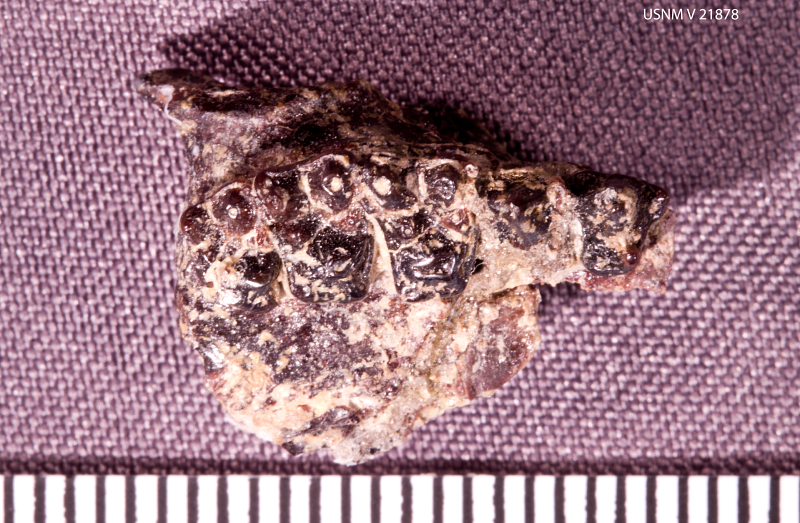
- Upper jaw of H.gracilis

Scientific classification
- Kingdom: Animalia
- Phylum: Chordata
- Class: Mammalia
- Order: Primates
- Family: †Omomyidae
- Genus: †Hemiacodon; Marsh, 1872

Species
- H. gracilis (Marsh, 1872); H. engardae (Murphey & Dunn, 2009); H. casamissus (Beard et al. 1992); H. pygmaeus (Wortman, 1904)

= Hemiacodon =

Hemiacodon Temporal range: 46.2–42.0 Ma

Genus of Eocene omomyid mammal

Hemiacodon is a genus of early Eocene omomyid from North America.

== Description ==
Hemiacodon is known from mainly dentary material, and the various species are differentiated by the shape and development of shearing crests on the molar. This variation in molar shape indicates the different species had varied diets.

== Paleoecology ==
Hemiacodon lived alongside many other primates in western North America, including Pelycodus, Notharctus and Macrotarsius. Older literature speculates that the diversity of primates in early Eocene California was caused by them being temporary "safe havens", meaning the environment was more accommodating than surrounding areas.
