= Macrotarsius =

Macrotarsius Temporal range: Eocene

Scientific classification
- Kingdom: Animalia
- Phylum: Chordata
- Class: Mammalia
- Order: Primates
- Family: †Omomyidae
- Genus: †Macrotarsius; Clark, 1941

Type species
- Macrotarsius montanus Clark, 1941

Species
- Macrotarsius montanus; Macrotarsius macrorhysis; Macrotarsius siegerti; Macrotarsius jepseni; Macrotarsius roederi

Extinct genus of primates

Macrotarsius is an extinct genus of omomyid that inhabited North America and East Asia during the Eocene epoch.

== Taxonomy ==
Macrotarsius contains five species: the type species M. montanus, M. jepseni, M. macrorhysis, M. roederi, and M. siegerti.

== Distribution ==
Macrotarsius macrorhysis lived in Jiangsu, China, during the Middle Eocene.
