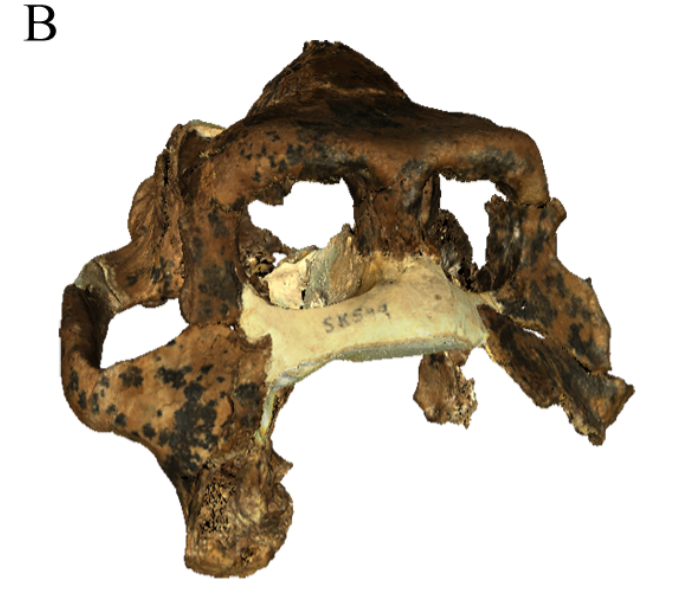
- Dinopithecus ingens skull.

Scientific classification
- Kingdom: Animalia
- Phylum: Chordata
- Class: Mammalia
- Order: Primates
- Family: Cercopithecidae
- Subfamily: Cercopithecinae
- Tribe: Papionini
- Genus: †Dinopithecus; Broom, 1937
- Species: †D. ingens

Binomial name
- †Dinopithecus ingens Broom, 1937

= Dinopithecus =

Dinopithecus Temporal range: Pliocene–Pleistocene

Extinct genus of cercopithecid

Dinopithecus ("terrible ape") is an extinct genus of medium to large sized cercopithecoid primates, closely related to baboons, that lived during the Pliocene and Pleistocene epochs in South Africa and Ethiopia. It was named by British paleontologist Robert Broom in 1937. The only species currently recognized is Dinopithecus ingens, as D. quadratirostris has been reassigned to the genus Soromandrillus. It is known from several infilled cave sites in South Africa, all of early Pleistocene age, including Skurweberg, Swartkrans (Member 1), and Sterkfontein (Member 4 or 5, but probably member 4).

== Description ==
Dinopithecus was larger than the largest living baboons, with males averaging at 46 kg (101 lb) and reaching maximum weight of 57 kg (126 lb) and females averaging at 35 kg (77 lb) and reaching maximum weight of 37 kg (82 lb), based on estimates from the molar teeth, some original mass estimates suggest a mass of 70-80 kg for Dinopithecus, though this might be outdated and obsolete. The most distinguishing feature of the genus is its large size in comparison to other papionins. The only other papionin species to attain a similar size were Theropithecus brumpti and Theropithecus oswaldi. These, however, are very different from Dinopithecus in their dental morphology. Overall, the skull is similar to that of modern baboons, except that it generally lacks the facial fossae (depressions on the sides of the muzzle and lower jaw) and maxillary ridges (ridges of bone that run along the upper sides of the snout). For these reasons, Dinopithecus is sometimes treated as a subgenus of Papio.

== Paleoecology ==
Most living papionins are omnivorous feeders that consume a wide range of readily digestible plant parts, especially fruits, as well as insects and other invertebrates, and small vertebrates. An analysis of the carbon isotopes from samples of its tooth enamel found Dinopithecus to consume the smallest portion of grass and other savanna-based foods of any South African primate. Analysis of the microwear patterns on the molar teeth showed that they were similar to those of the living yellow baboon (Papio cynocephalus), suggesting a broad and eclectic diet. A study of the adaptations of the molar teeth suggested that D. ingens ate a very high percentage of fruit and relatively few leaves.

No bones of the limbs or other parts beyond the skulls and teeth have been attributed to Dinopithecus, so it is impossible to know its mode of locomotion for certain. However, as a papionin of very large size, it most probably spent a significant amount of time on the ground and moved quadrupedally.
