= Grass-eater =

Grass-eater can refer to:

- Herbivore men or grasseaters, a Japanese man who express little interest in getting married or being assertive in relationships with women
- Graminivore
- The Grass Eater, a 1961 film by John Hayes
- Redtop Grass Eaters, an Amerind tribe
