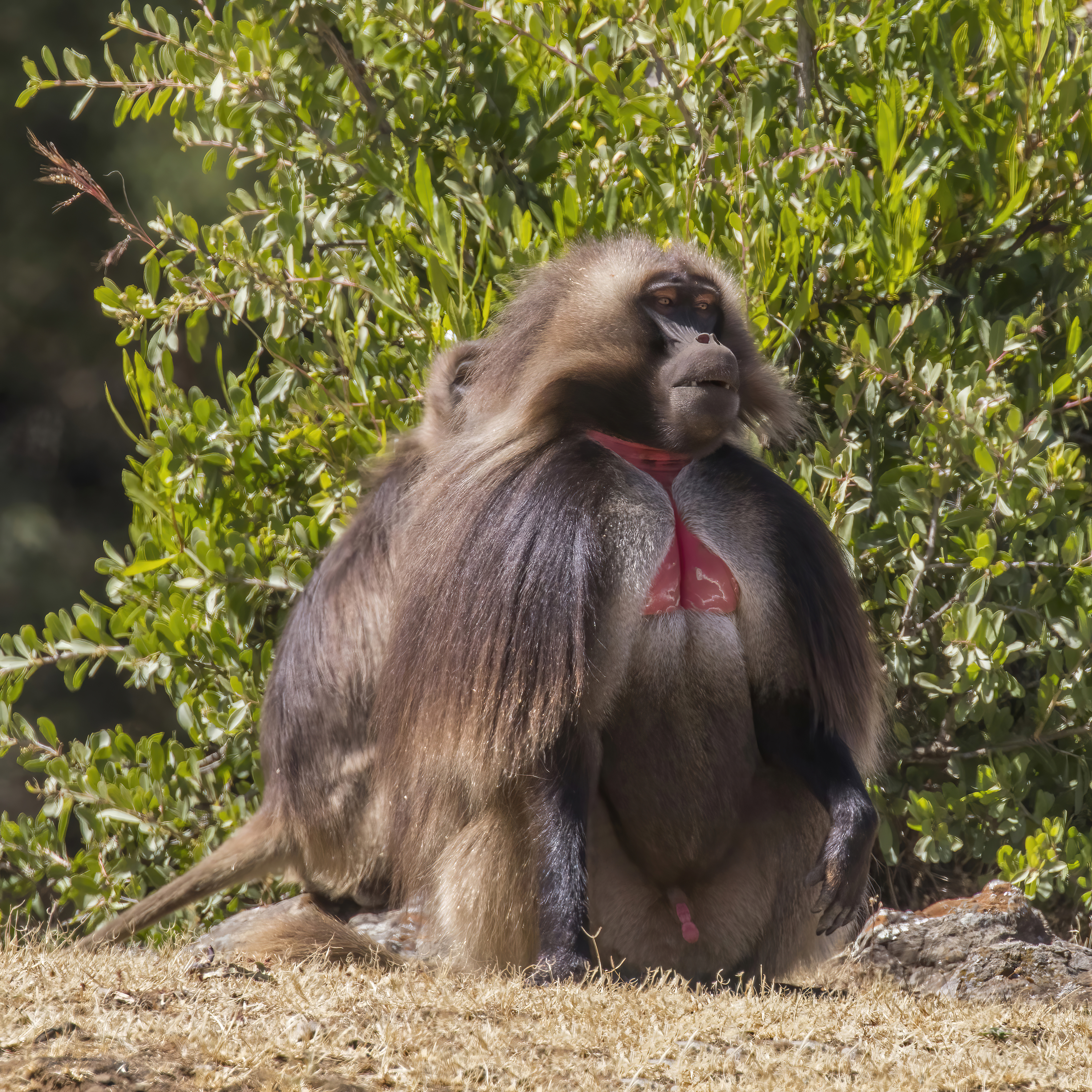
- Male
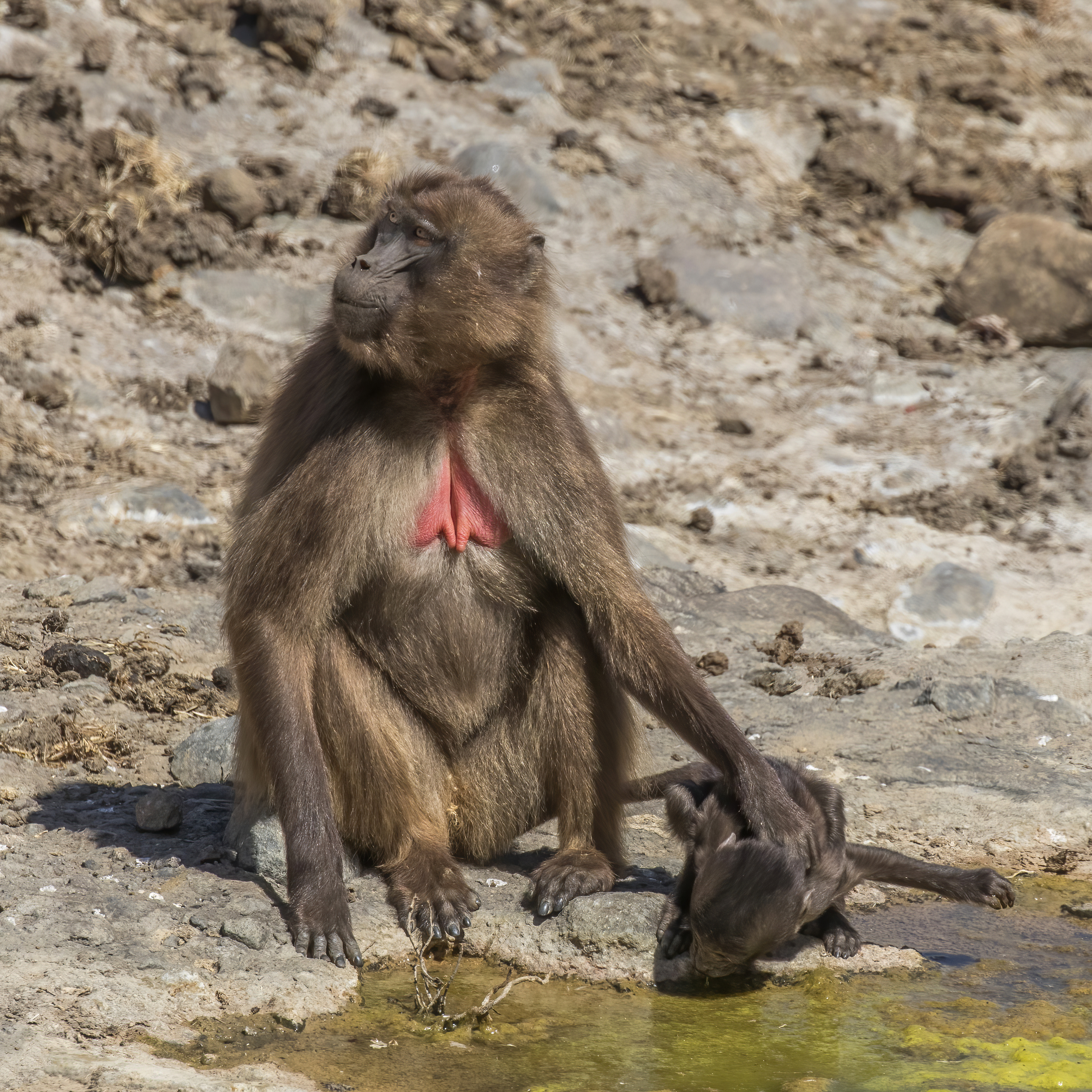
- Female with baby drinking Both T. g. obscurus near Debre Libanos, Ethiopia

Conservation status
- Least Concern (IUCN 3.1)

Scientific classification
- Kingdom: Animalia
- Phylum: Chordata
- Class: Mammalia
- Order: Primates
- Suborder: Haplorhini
- Family: Cercopithecidae
- Genus: Theropithecus
- Species: T. gelada

Binomial name
- Theropithecus gelada (Rüppell, 1835)
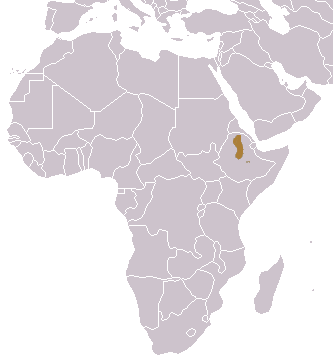
- Gelada range

= Gelada =

Species of Old World monkey

The gelada (Theropithecus gelada, Amharic: ጭላዳ, romanized: č̣əlada, Oromo: Jaldeessa daabee), sometimes called the bleeding-heart monkey or the gelada baboon, is a species of Old World monkey found only in the Ethiopian Highlands, living at elevations of 1,800–4,400 m (5,900–14,400 ft) above sea level. It is the only living member of the genus Theropithecus, a name derived from the Greek root words for "beast-ape" (θηρο-πίθηκος : thēro-píthēkos). Like its close relatives in genus Papio, the baboons, it is largely terrestrial, spending much of its time foraging in grasslands, with grasses comprising up to 90% of its diet.

It has buff to dark brown hair with a dark face and pale eyelids. Adult males have longer hair on their backs and a conspicuous bright red patch of skin shaped like an hourglass on their chests. Females also have a bare patch of skin but it is less pronounced, except during estrus, when it brightens and exhibits a "necklace" of fluid-filled blisters. Males average 18.5 kg (41 lb) and females average 11 kg (24 lb) in weight. The head-body length is 50–75 cm (20–30 in) with a tail of 30–50 cm (12–20 in).

The gelada has a complex multilevel social structure. Reproductive units and male units are the two basic groupings. A band comprises a mix of multiple reproductive units and male units; a community is made up of one to four bands. Within the reproductive units the females are commonly closely related. Males will move from their natal group to try to control a unit of their own and females within the unit can choose to support or oppose the new male. When more than one male is in the unit, only one can mate with the females. The gelada has a diverse repertoire of vocalizations thought to be near in complexity to that of humans.

The population of geladas is thought to have dropped from 440,000 in the 1970s to 200,000 in 2008. Despite the heavy loss, it is listed as least concern by the International Union for Conservation of Nature.

== Taxonomy and evolution ==
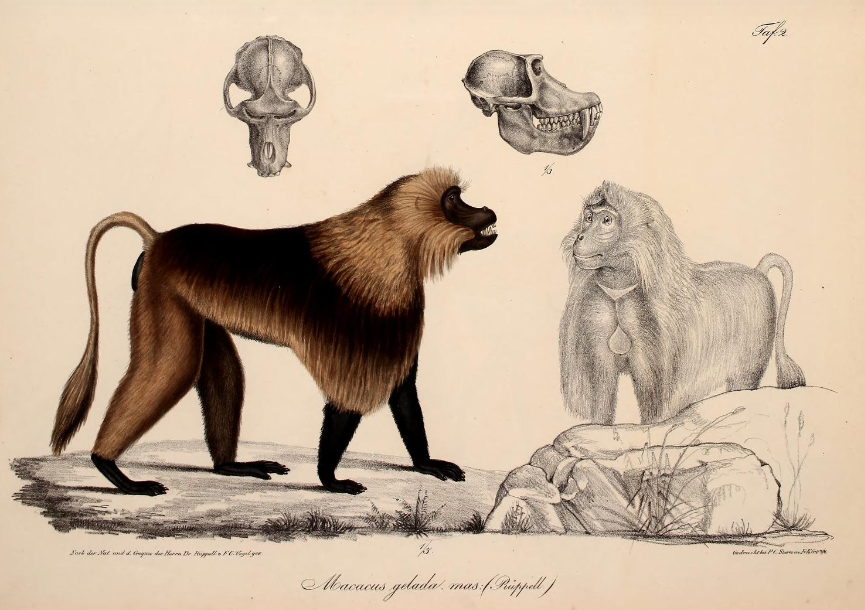
Rüppell's depiction of the species (1835)

Since 1979, the gelada is customarily placed in its own genus (Theropithecus), though some genetic research suggests that this monkey should be grouped with its baboon (genus Papio) kin; other researchers have classified the species even more distantly from Papio. While Theropithecus gelada is the only living species of its genus, separate, larger species are known from the fossil record: T. brumpti, T. darti and T. oswaldi, formerly classified under genus Simopithecus. Theropithecus, while restricted at present to Ethiopia, is also known from fossil specimens found in Africa and the Mediterranean into Asia, including South Africa, Malawi, the Democratic Republic of the Congo, Tanzania, Uganda, Kenya, Algeria, Morocco, Spain, and India (more exactly at Mirzapur, Cueva Victoria, Pirro Nord, Ternifine, Hadar, Turkana, Makapansgat, and Swartkrans).

The two subspecies of gelada are:

- Northern gelada, T. g. gelada
- Eastern gelada, southern gelada, or Heuglin's gelada, T. g. obscurus

=== Common name ===
The gelada has been referred to by other names, including the "gelada baboon", "bleeding-heart baboon", or simply "baboon", implying a monophyletic relationship with baboons, which historically included (apart from Theropithecus) the genera Papio (true baboons), and Mandrillus (mandrills and drills). Since the 1990s, however, molecular phylogenetic studies clarified relationships among papionin monkeys, demonstrating that mangabeys of the genus Lophocebus are more closely related to Papio and Theropithecus, while mangabeys of the genus Cercocebus are more closely related to Mandrillus. These findings largely invalidated any scientifically based justification for referring to mandrills and drills as baboons, as doing so while excluding the unbaboon-like Lophocebus mangabeys would create a polyphyletic group. The status of geladas was less clear and the relationships among Papio, Lophocebus, and Theropithecus continue to reflect high levels of uncertainty, which are further complicated by the discovery of the kipunji. Nevertheless, the most recent and extensive phylogenetic study to date demonstrates that, while large fractions of the genome show an alternative history, the dominant relationship across the genome supports a closer relationship between Papio and Lophocebus, with Theropithecus as the outgroup. As a close sister relationship between Papio and Theropithecus is the least-supported scenario in recent studies, "gelada baboon" and other names implying a close relationship with baboons, with increasing clarity, are not scientifically justified, leading researchers to advocate for the common name to be simply "gelada".

== Description ==
The gelada is large and robust, and it is covered with buff to dark-brown, coarse hair and has a dark face with pale eyelids. Its arms and feet are nearly black. Its short tail ends in a tuft of hair. Adult males have a long, heavy cape of hair on their backs. The gelada has a hairless face with a short muzzle that looks more similar to a chimpanzee's than a baboon's. It can also be physically distinguished from a baboon by the bright patch of skin on its chest. This patch is hourglass-shaped. On males, it is bright red and surrounded by white hair; on females, it is far less pronounced, but when in estrus, the female's patch brightens, and a "necklace" of fluid-filled blisters forms on the patch. This is thought to be analogous to the swollen buttocks common to most baboons experiencing estrus. In addition, females have knobs of skin around their patches. Geladas also have well-developed ischial callosities. Sexual dimorphism is seen in this species; males average 18.5 kg (40.8 lb), while females are smaller, averaging 11 kg (24.3 lb). The head and body length of this species is 50–75 cm (19.7–29.5 in) for both sexes. Tail length is 30–50 cm (11.8–19.7 in).

The gelada has several adaptations for its terrestrial and graminivorous (grass-eating) lifestyle. It has small, sturdy fingers adapted for pulling grass and narrow, small incisors adapted for chewing it. The gelada has a unique gait, known as the shuffle gait, that it uses when feeding. It squats bipedally and moves by sliding its feet without changing its posture. Because of this gait, the gelada's rump is hidden beneath, so is unavailable for display; its bright red chest patch is visible, though.

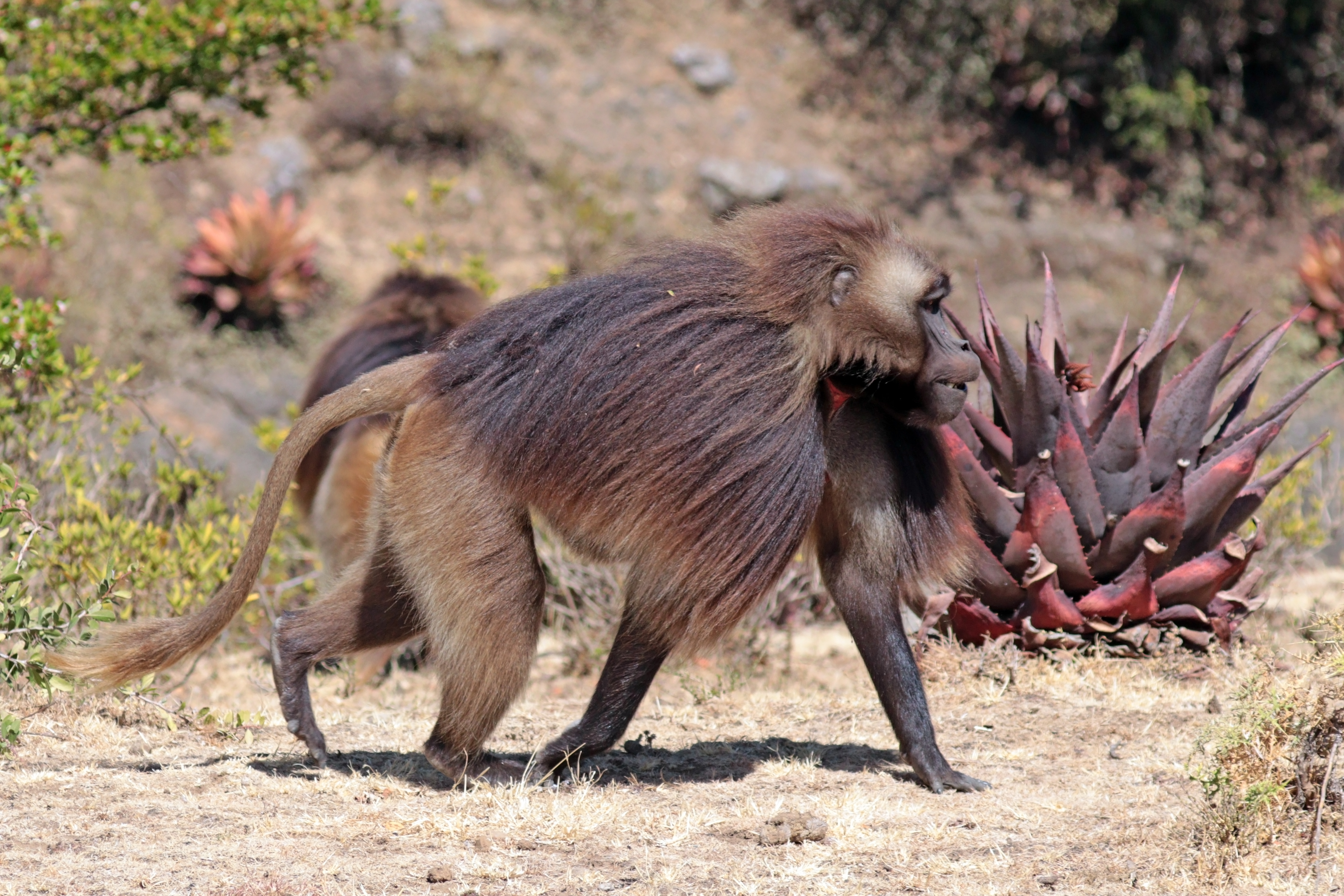
Male

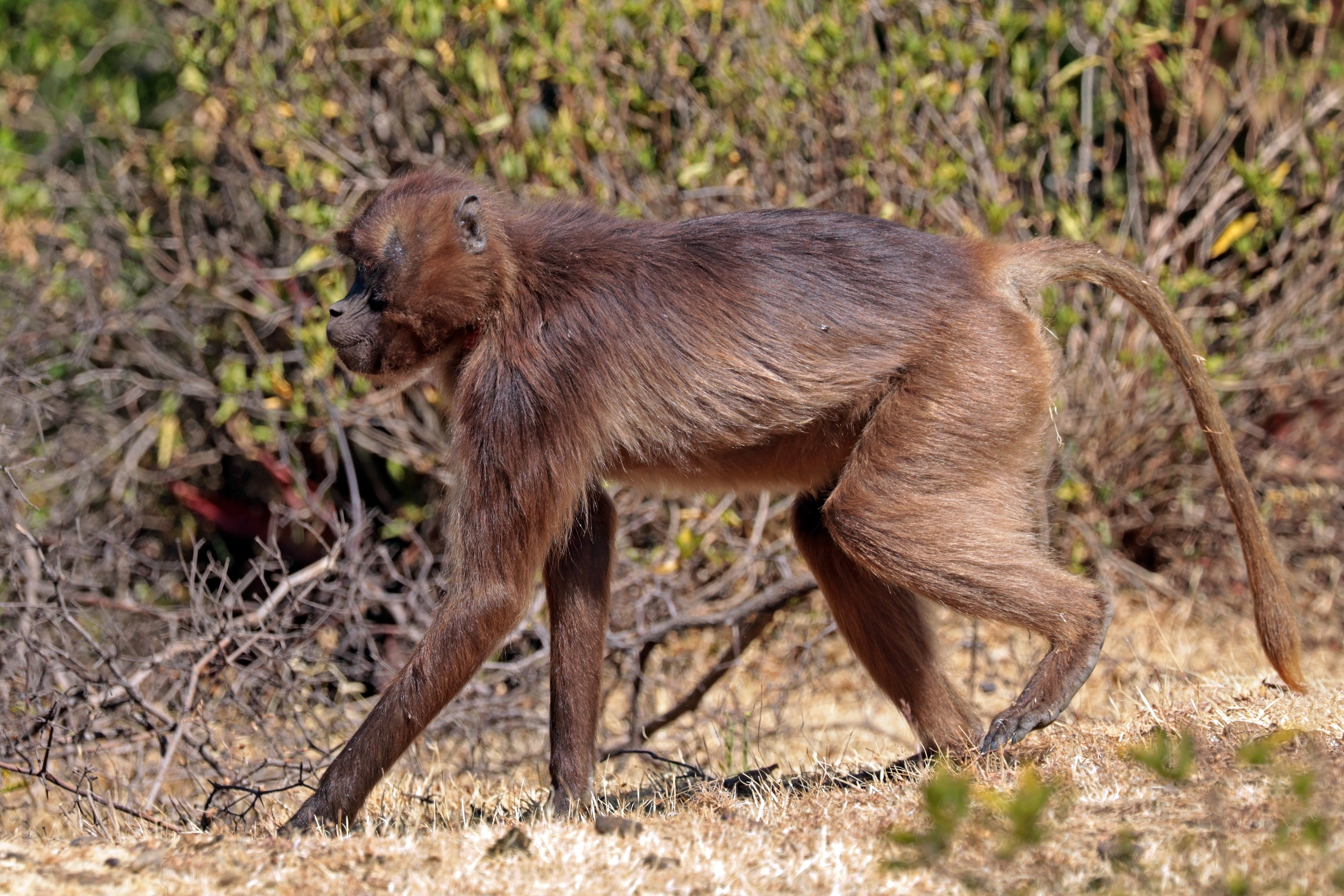
Female

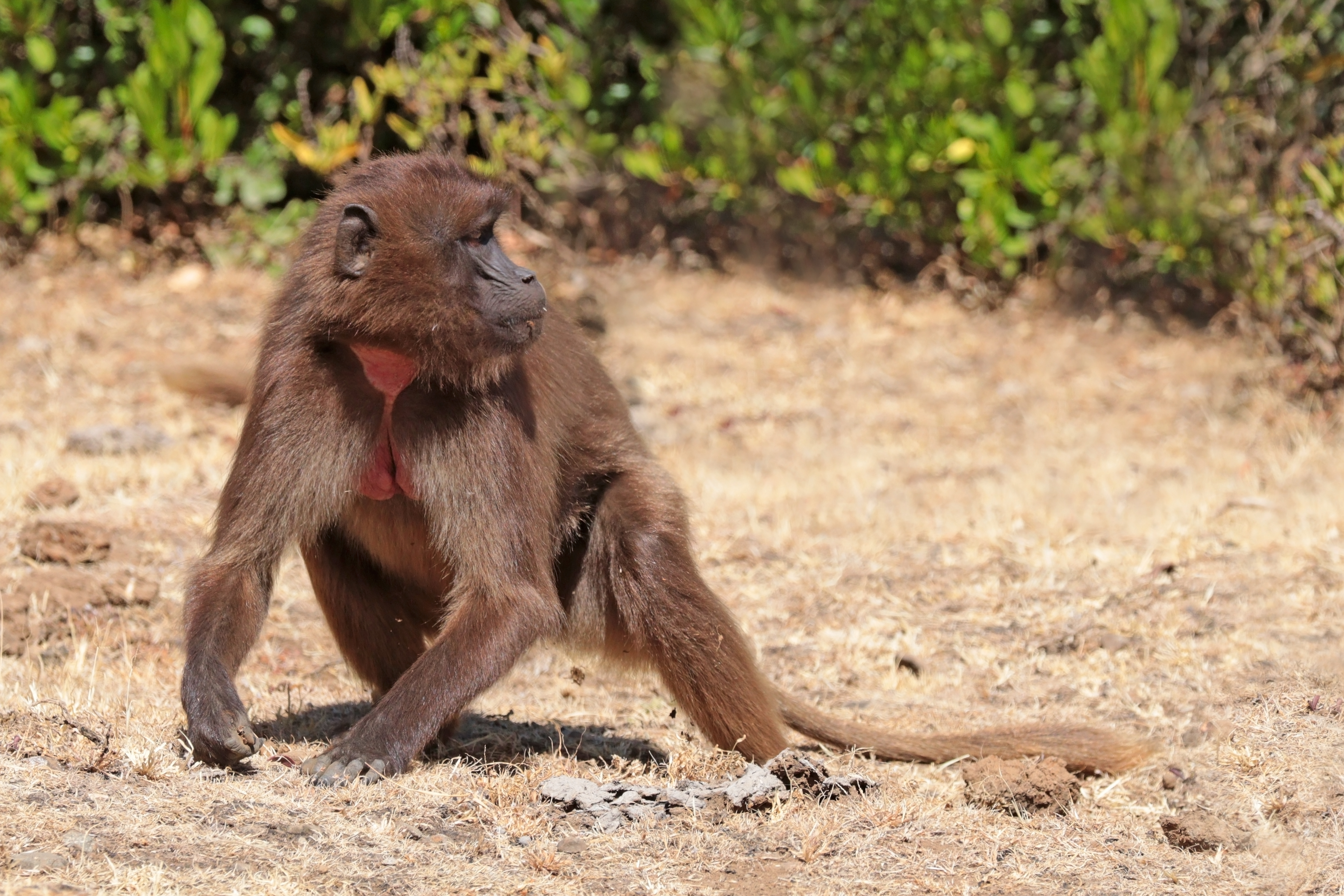
Juvenile male

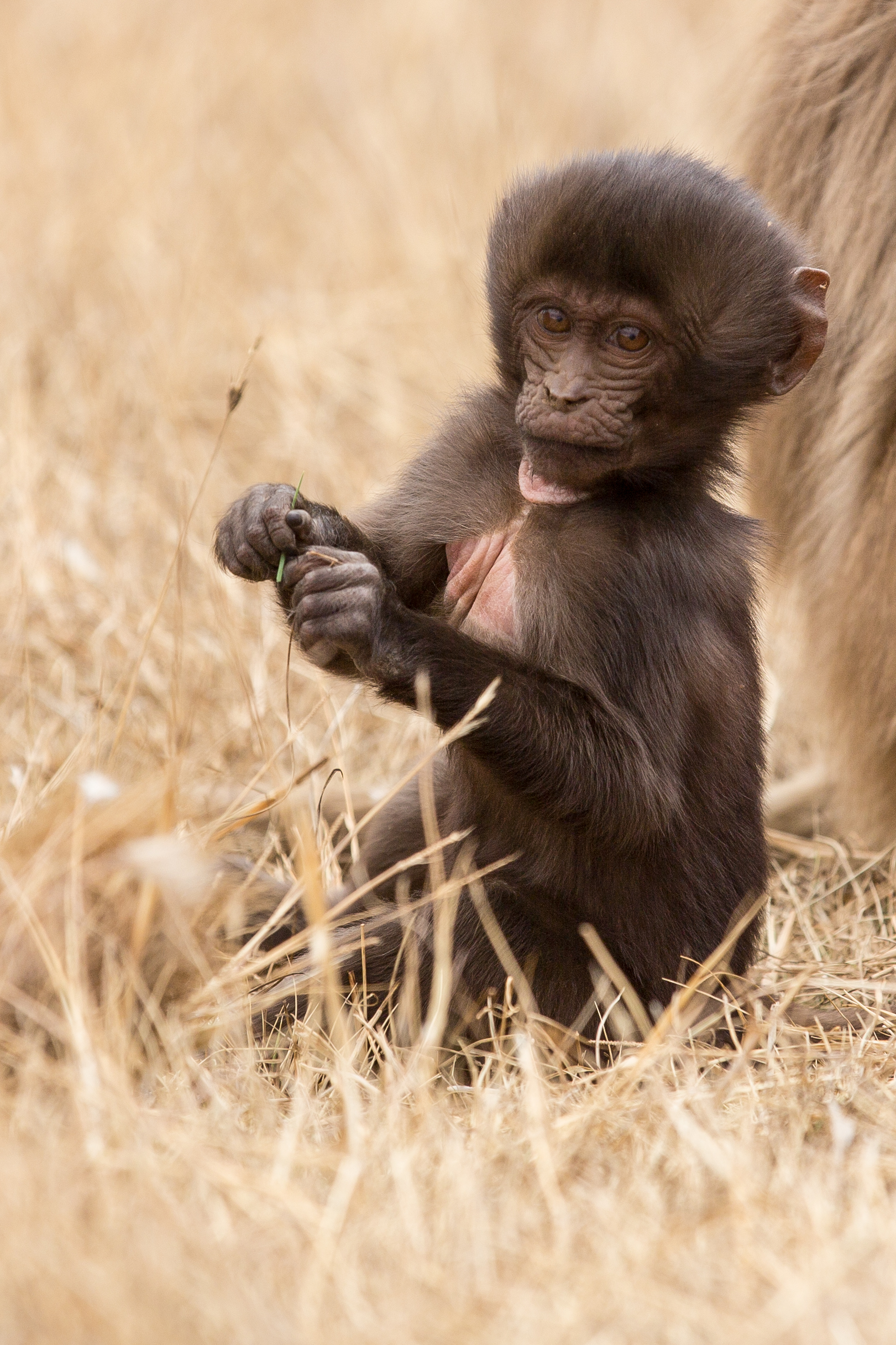
Juvenile gelada in dry season

== Range and ecology ==
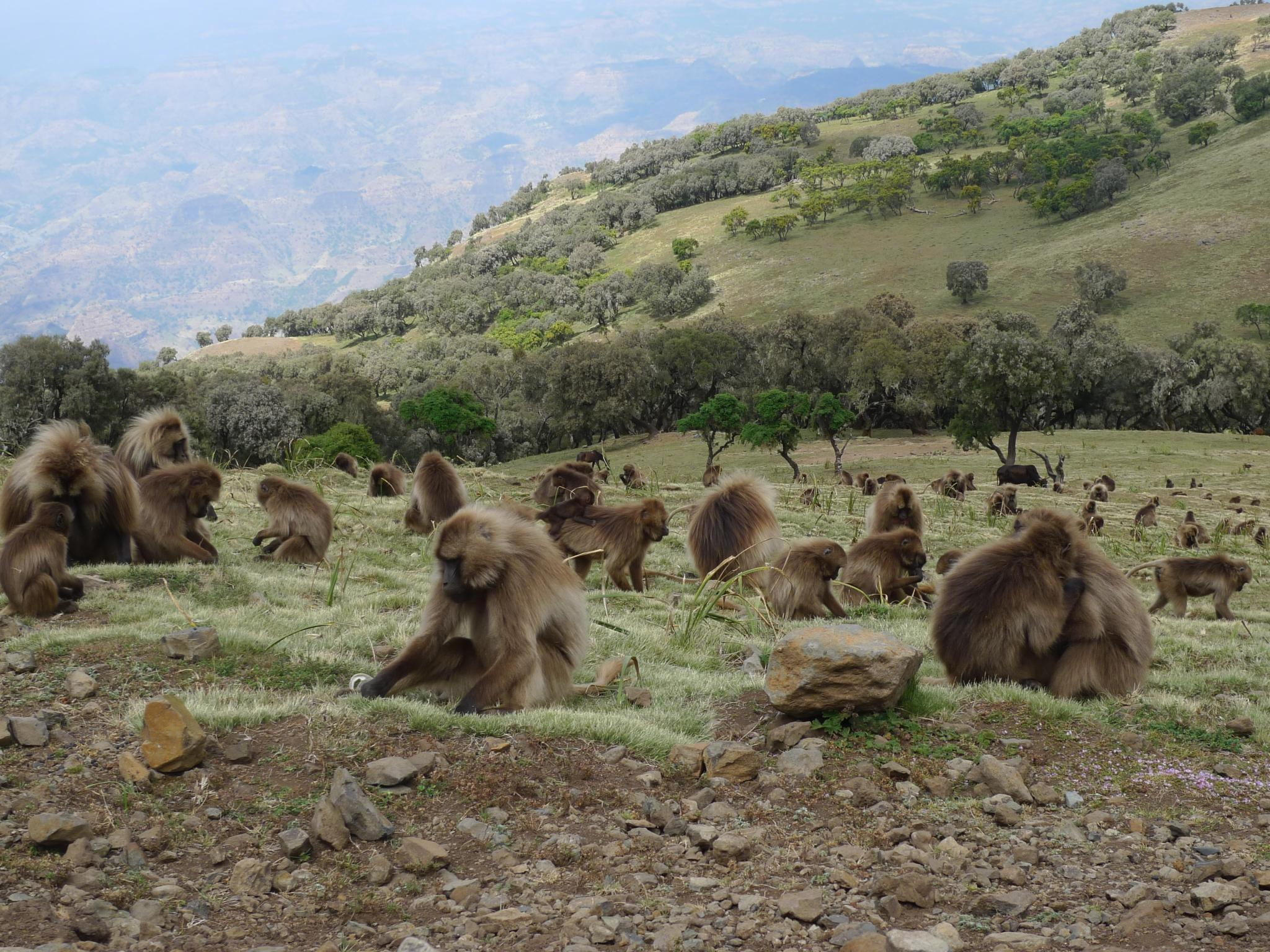
Grazing geladas at 3,000 m (9,800 ft) in the Semien Mountains

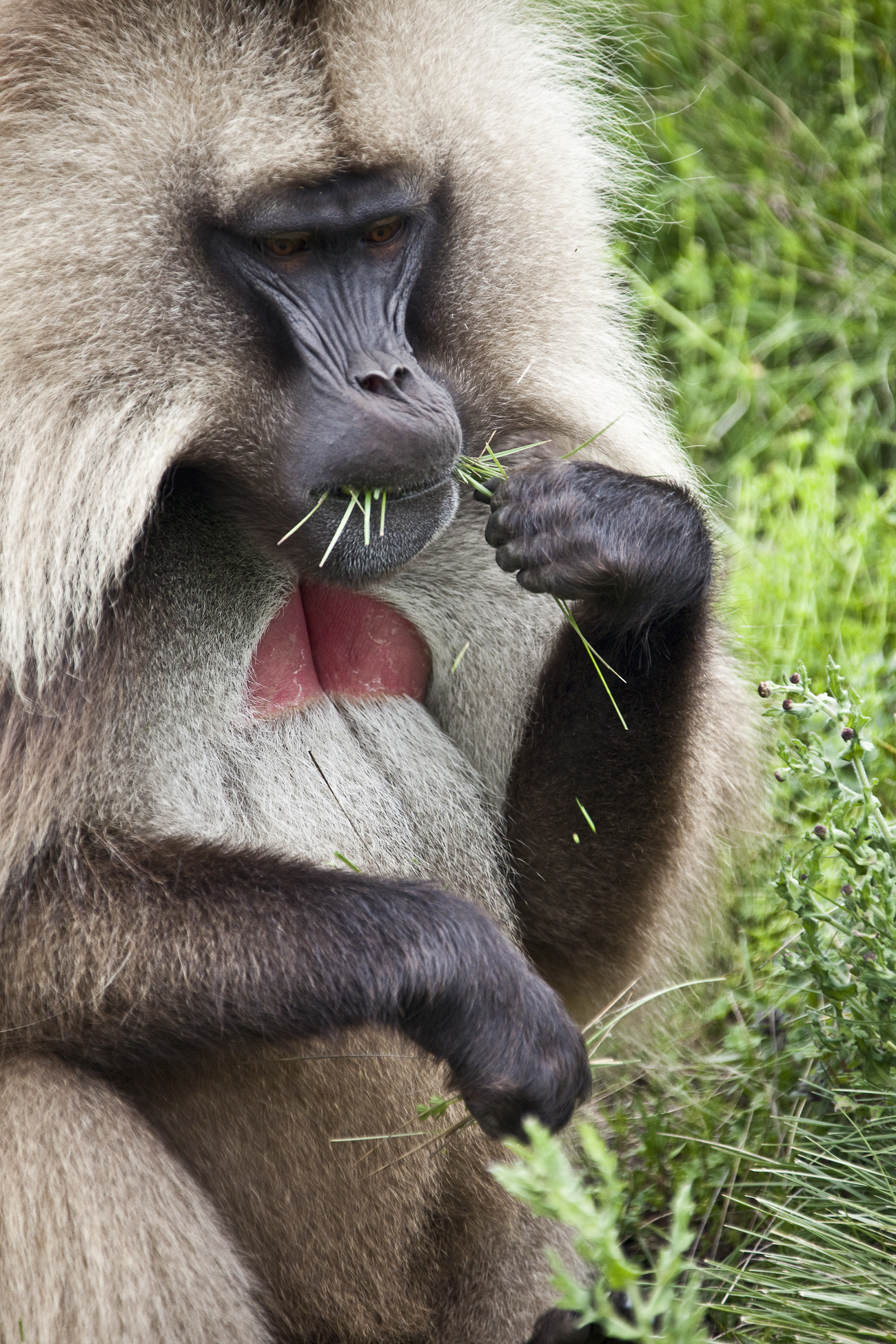
Male gelada eating grass

Geladas are found only in the high grasslands of the deep gorges of the central Ethiopian plateau. They live in elevations 1,800–4,400 m (5,900–14,400 ft) above sea level, using the cliffs for sleeping and montane grasslands for foraging. These grasslands have widely spaced trees and also contain bushes and dense thickets. The highland areas where they live tend to be cooler and less arid than lowland areas. Thus, the geladas usually do not experience the negative effects that the dry season has on food availability. Nevertheless, in some areas, they do experience frost in the dry season, as well as hailstorms in the wet season.

Geladas are the only primates that are primarily graminivores and grazers – grass blades make up to 90% of their diet. They eat both the blades and the seeds of grasses. When both blades and seeds are available, geladas prefer the seeds. They eat flowers, rhizomes, and roots when available, using their hands to dig for the latter two. They consume herbs, small plants, fruits, creepers, bushes, and thistles. Insects can be eaten, but only rarely and only if they can easily be obtained. During the dry season, herbs are preferred over grasses. Geladas consume their food more like ungulates than primates, and they can chew their food as effectively as zebra.

Geladas are primarily diurnal. At night, they sleep on the ledges of cliffs. At sunrise, they leave the cliffs and travel to the tops of the plateaus to feed and socialize. When morning ends, social activities tend to wane and the geladas primarily focus on foraging. They travel during this time, as well. When evening arrives, they exhibit more social activities before descending to the cliffs to sleep. Predators observed to hunt geladas include domestic dogs, leopards, servals, hyenas, and lammergeiers.

== Behavior ==
=== Social structure ===
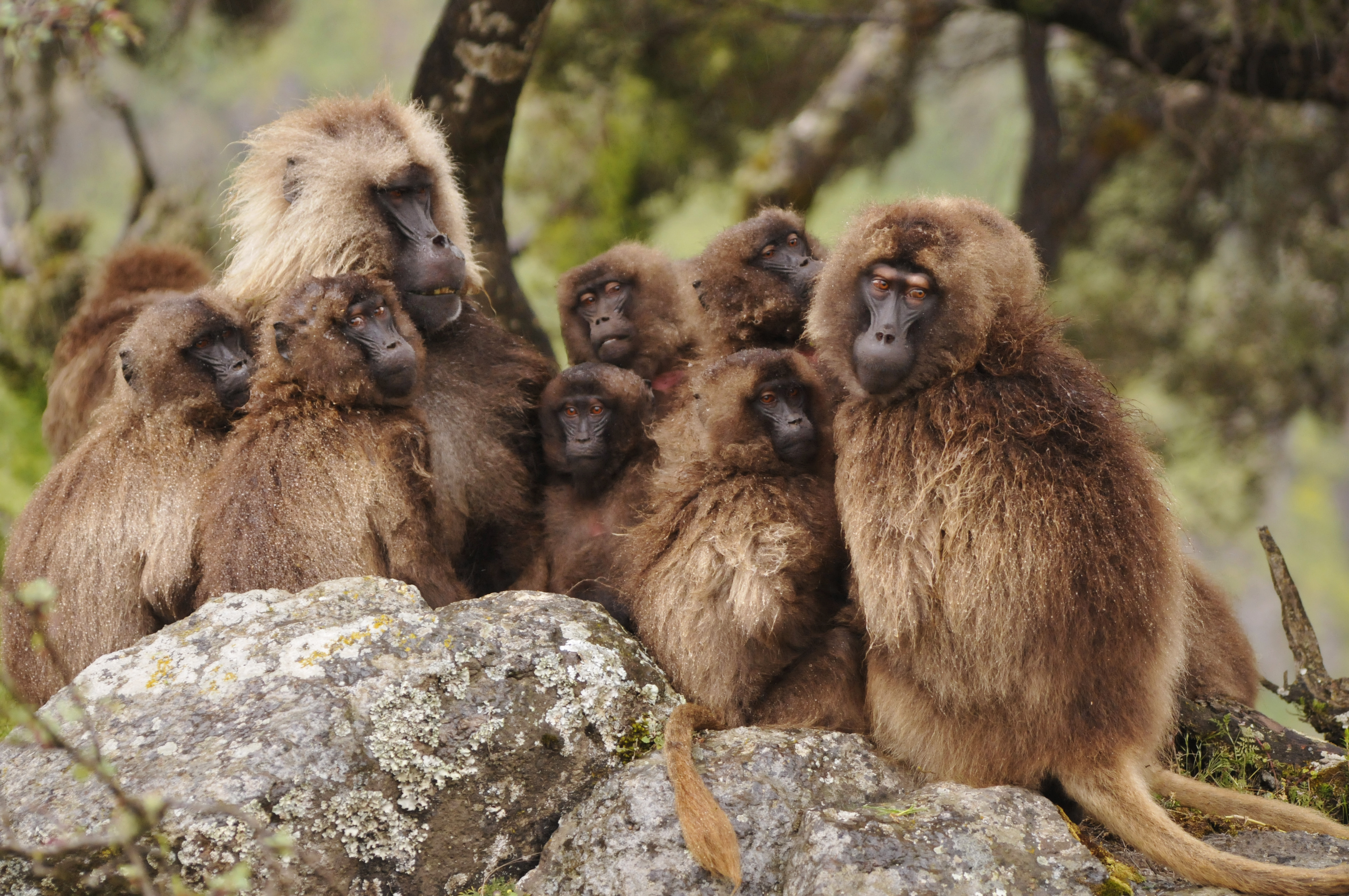
Gelada reproductive unit

Geladas live in a complex, multilevel society similar to that of the hamadryas baboon. The smallest and most basic groups are the reproductive units, which include up to 12 females, their young, and one to four males, and the all-male units, which are made up of 2–15 males. The next level of gelada societies are the bands, which are made up of two to 27 reproductive units and several all-male units. Herds consist of up to 60 reproductive units that are sometimes from different bands and last for short times. Communities are made of one to four bands whose home ranges overlap extensively. A gelada typically lives around 15 years.

Within the reproductive units, the females tend to be closely related and have strong social bonds. Reproductive units split if they become too large. While females have strong social bonds in the group, a female only interacts with at most three other members of her unit. Grooming and other social interactions among females usually occur between pairs. Females in a reproductive unit exist in a hierarchy, with higher-ranking females having more reproductive success and more offspring than lower-ranking females. Closely related females tend to have a similar hierarchical status. Females generally stay in their natal units for life; cases of females leaving are rare. Aggression within a reproduction unit, which is rare, is usually just between the females. Aggression is more frequent between members of different reproductive units and is usually started by females, but males and females from both sides can join and engage if the conflict escalates.

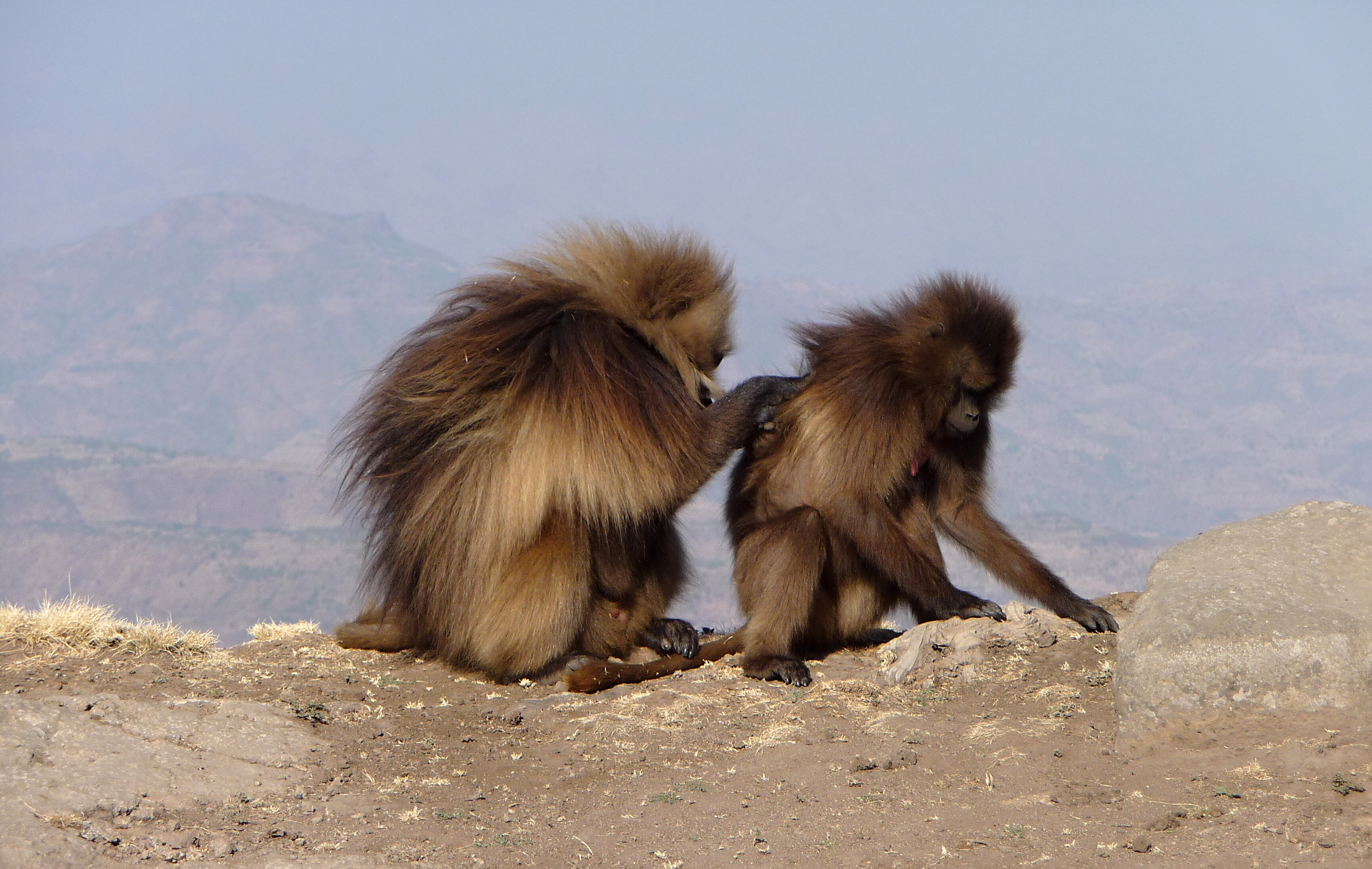
Male grooming a female

Males can remain in a reproductive unit for four to five years. While geladas have traditionally been considered to have a male-transfer society, many males appear to be likely to return and breed in their natal bands. Nevertheless, gelada males leave their natal units and try to take over a unit of their own. A male can take over a reproductive unit either through direct aggression and fighting or by joining one as a subordinate and taking some females with him to create a new unit. When more than one male is in a unit, only one of them can mate with the females. The females in the group together can have power over the dominant male. When a new male tries to take over a unit and overthrow the resident male, the females can choose to support or oppose him. The male maintains his relationship with the females by grooming them rather than forcing his dominance, in contrast to the society of the hamadryas baboon. Females accept a male into the unit by presenting themselves to him. Not all the females may interact with the male. Usually, one may be his main partner. The male may sometimes be monopolized by this female. The male may try to interact with the other females, but they are usually unresponsive.

Most all-male units consist of several subadults and one young adult, led by one male. A member of an all-male unit may spend two to four years in the group before attempting to join a reproductive unit. All-male groups are generally aggressive towards both reproductive units and other all-male units. As in reproductive units, aggression within all-male units is rare. As bands, reproductive units exist in a common home range. Within the band, members are closely related and between the units there is no social hierarchy. Bands usually break apart every eight to nine years as a new band forms in a new home range.

Researchers from the University of the Free State in South Africa, while observing gelada during field studies, discovered that the monkeys were capable of "cheating" on their partners and covering up their infidelity. A nondominant male mates surreptitiously with a female, with both suppressing their normal mating cries so as not to be overheard. If discovered, the dominant male attacks the miscreants in a clear form of punishment. It is the first time that evidence of the knowledge of cheating and fear of discovery have been recorded among animals in the wild. Dr. Aliza le Roux of the university's Department of Zoology and Entomology believes that dishonesty and punishment are not uniquely human traits, and that the observed evidence of this behaviour among gelada monkeys suggests that the roots of the human system of deceit, crime, and punishment lie very deep indeed.

Mixed-species association was observed between solitary Ethiopian wolves and geladas. According to the study's findings, gelada monkeys typically do not move on encountering Ethiopian wolves, even when they were in the middle of the herd; 68% of encounters resulted in no movement and only 11% resulted in a movement greater than 10 m (33 ft). In stark contrast, the geladas always fled great distances to the cliffs for safety whenever they encountered aggressive domestic dogs.

=== Reproduction and parenting ===
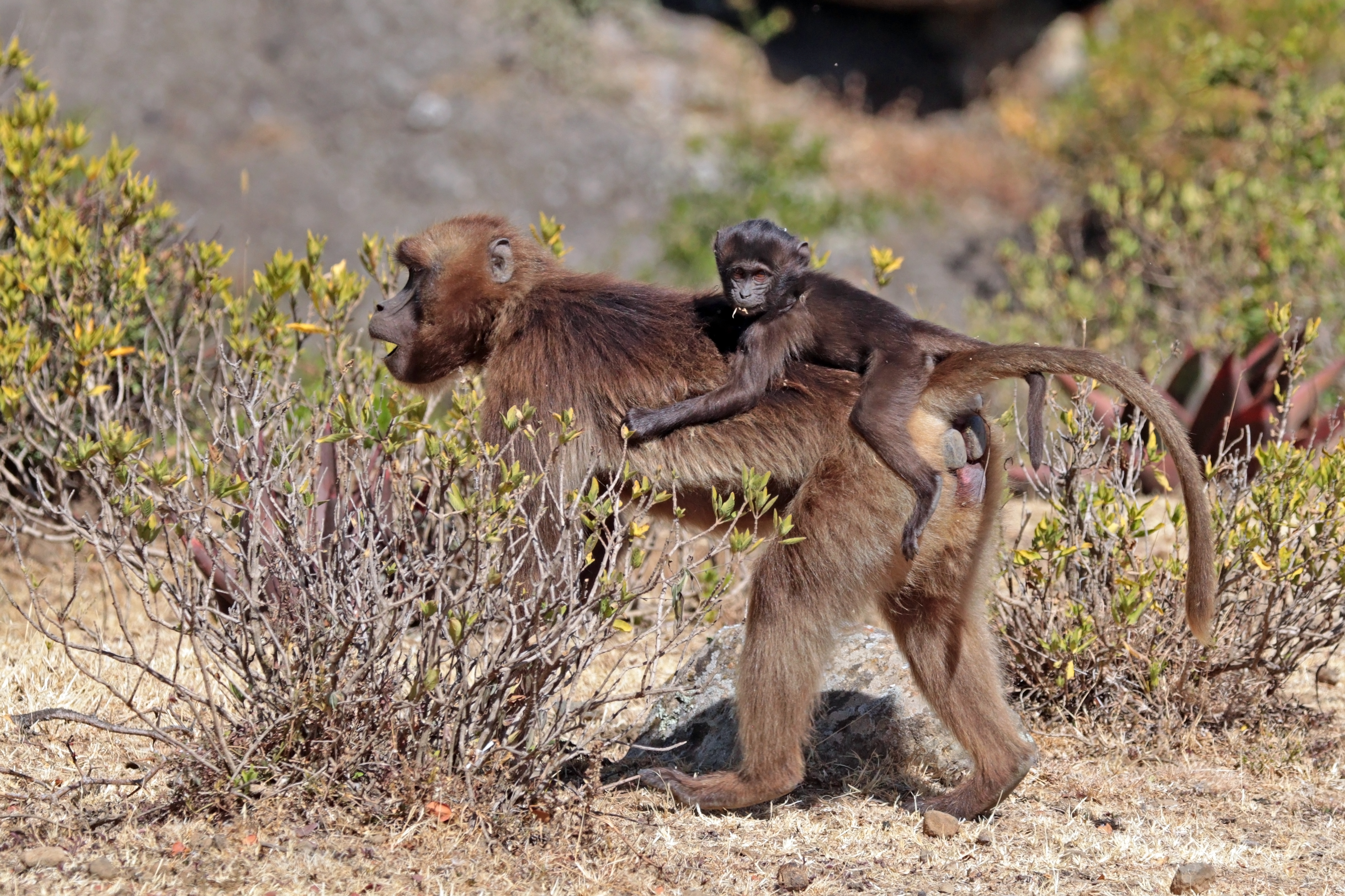
Female with baby on her back

When in estrus, the female points her posterior towards a male and raises it, moving her tail to one side. The male then approaches the female and inspects her chest and genital areas. A female will copulate up to five times per day, usually around midday. Breeding and reproduction can occur at any time of the year, although some areas have birth peaks.

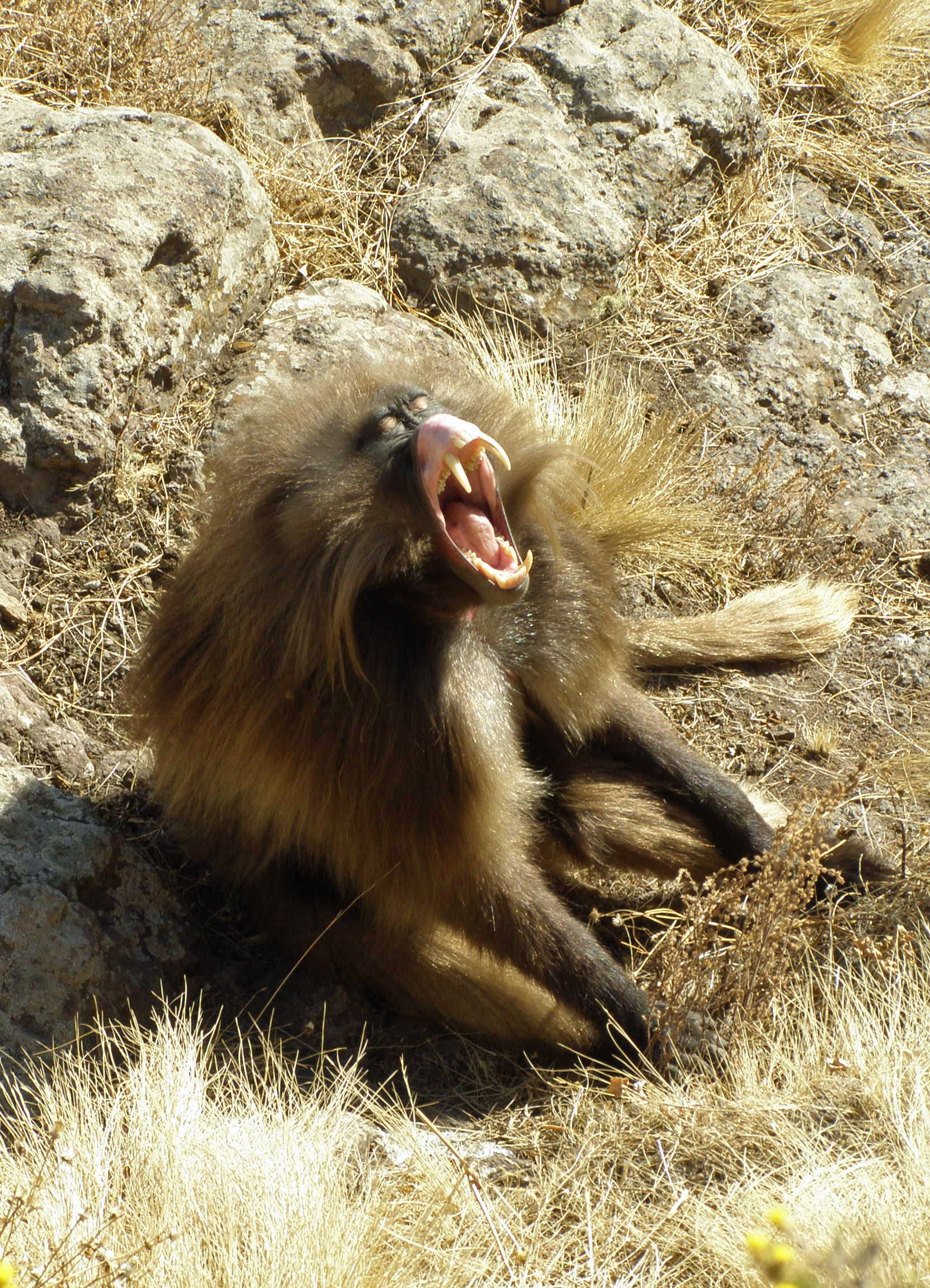
Male displaying his teeth and gums with his lip flipped back

Most births occur at night. Newborn infants have red faces and closed eyes, and they are covered in black hair. On average, newborn infants weigh 464 g (16.4 oz).

If a new male assumes mastery of a harem, females impregnated by the previous leader have an 80% likelihood of aborting, in a phenomenon known as the Bruce effect. Females come into estrus quickly after giving birth, so males have little incentive for practising infanticide, although it does occur in some communities in the Arsi region of Ethiopia, which may be an incentive for females to abort and avoid investing caring for an infant that will most likely be killed. Females also practice deceptive fertility signalling when conception is unlikely, a strategy to avoid infanticide.

Infanticide in geladas remains fairly uncommon, though, compared to many primates that live in one-male units such as gorillas or gray langurs. The females that cancel their pregnancy are thought to bond with the new leader faster. When a male loses his position as dominant harem master, the females and new leader may allow him to remain in the social unit as a nonbreeding resident to act as a babysitter. This way, the ex-leader can protect any infants he had fathered from being killed by the new leader, the females can protect the infants fathered by him, and when the new leader faces a potential rival, the ex-leader will be more inclined to help support him in keeping rivals at bay.

Mortality among infants occurs at its highest in the wet season, but on average, over 85% of infants survive to their fourth birthday, one of the great advantages of living in an environment with a food source few other animals can exploit, so is unable to sustain many large predators.

Females that have just given birth stay on the periphery of the reproductive unit. Other adult females may take an interest in the infants and even kidnap them. An infant is carried on its mother's belly for the first five weeks, and thereafter on her back. Infants can move independently at around five months old. A subordinate male in a reproductive unit may help care for an infant when it is six months old.

When herds form, juveniles and infants may gather into play groups of around 10 individuals. When males reach puberty, they gather into unstable groups independent of the reproductive units. Females sexually mature at around three years, but do not give birth for another year. Males reach puberty at about four to five years, but they are usually unable to reproduce because of social constraints and wait until they are about eight to ten years old. Average lifespan in the wild is 15 years.

=== Communication ===
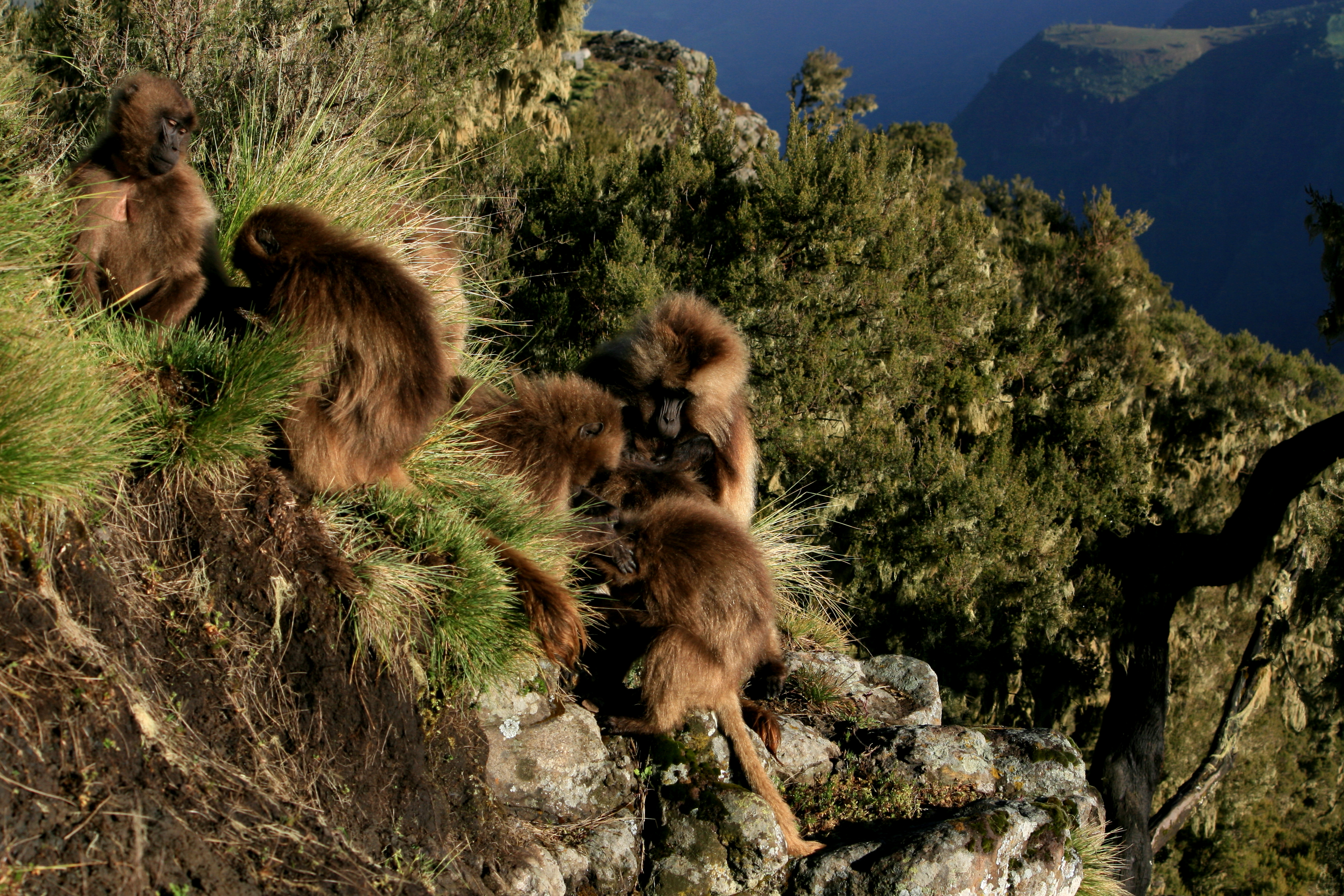
Geladas on a cliff

Adult geladas use a diverse repertoire of vocalizations for various purposes, such as: contact, reassurance, appeasement, solicitation, ambivalence, aggression, and defense. The level of complexity of these vocalizations is thought to be near that of humans. They sit around and chatter at each other, signifying to those around that they matter, in a way, to the individual "speaking". To some extent, calls are related to the status of an individual. In addition, females have calls signaling their estrus. Geladas communicate through gestures, as well. They display threats by flipping their upper lips back on their nostrils to display their teeth and gums, and by pulling back their scalps to display the pale eyelids. A gelada submits by fleeing or presenting itself.

In 2016, a research group at the University of Michigan found that gelada vocalizations obey Menzerath's law, observing that calls are abbreviated when used in longer sequences.

== Conservation status and human interactions ==
The gelada is considered a crop pest by farmers near Simien National Park. In 2005, they caused an average of 100 kg (220 lb) of crop damage per animal. The geladas had a distinct preference for barley.

In 2008, the IUCN assessed the gelada as least concern, although their population had reduced from an estimated 440,000 in the 1970s to around 200,000 in 2008. It is listed in Appendix II of CITES. Major threats to the gelada are a reduction of their range as a result of agricultural expansion and shooting as crop pests. Previously, these monkeys were trapped for use as laboratory animals or hunted to obtain their capes to make items of clothing. As of 2008, proposals have been made for a new Blue Nile Gorges National Park and Indeltu (Shebelle) Gorges Reserve to protect larger numbers.
