= Graminivore =

Animal that feeds primarily on grass

Horse grazing in a field

A graminivore is a herbivorous animal that feeds primarily on grass, specifically "true" grasses, plants of the family Poaceae (also known as Graminae). Graminivory is a form of grazing. These herbivorous animals have digestive systems that are adapted to digest large amounts of cellulose, which is abundant in fibrous plant matter and more difficult to break down for many other animals. As such, they have specialized enzymes to aid in digestion and in some cases symbiotic bacteria that live in their digestive track and "assist" with the digestive process through fermentation as the matter travels through the intestines.

Graminivores not only consume grasses, but also sedges. Grasses and sedges are both graminoids. Sedges are a part of the Cyperaceae family. Grasses are hollow with stems jointed and nodes, and typically have a round cross-section. Sedges are either round or triangular in cross section and not hollow.

Horses, cattle, geese, guinea pigs, hippopotamuses, capybara and giant pandas are examples of vertebrate graminivores. Some carnivorous vertebrates, such as dogs and cats, are known to eat grass occasionally. Grass consumption in dogs can be a way to rid their intestinal tract of parasites that may be threatening to the carnivore's health. Various invertebrates also have graminivorous diets. Many grasshoppers, such as individuals from the family Acrididae, have diets consisting primarily of plants from the family Poaceae. Although humans are not graminivores, we do get much of our nutrition from a type of grass called cereal, and especially from the fruit of that grass which is called grain.

Graminivores can also be invertebrates, for example Gomphocerinae (slant-faced grasshoppers). Graminivorous grasshoppers have parallel ridges for their teeth's chewing surfaces, often compared in shape to a mammoth or elephant.

Graminivores generally exhibit a preference on which species of grass they choose to consume. For example, according to a study done on North American bison feeding on shortgrass plains in north-eastern Colorado, the cattle consumed a total of thirty-six different species of plant. Of that thirty-six, five grass species were favoured and consumed the most pervasively. The average consumption of these five species comprised about 80% of their diet. A few of these species include Aristida longiseta, Muhlenbergia species, and Bouteloua gracilis.

Gelada monkeys eating grass

Graminivores have morphological adaptations to feed on grass. The Theropithecus gelada (the gelada monkey, the only primate graminivore) has evolved with smaller incisors and larger molars for chewing, as well as strong thumbs and smaller second fingers to harvest graminoids.

Feeding strategies for graminivores vary by life stages and species. Some species are graminivores as larvae but not as adults, for example the Moroccan locust (Dociostaurus maroccanus). On the other hand, Locusta migratoria cinerascens consistently eats grasses through adulthood, eating more grass with higher availability, but they don't only eat grass.
