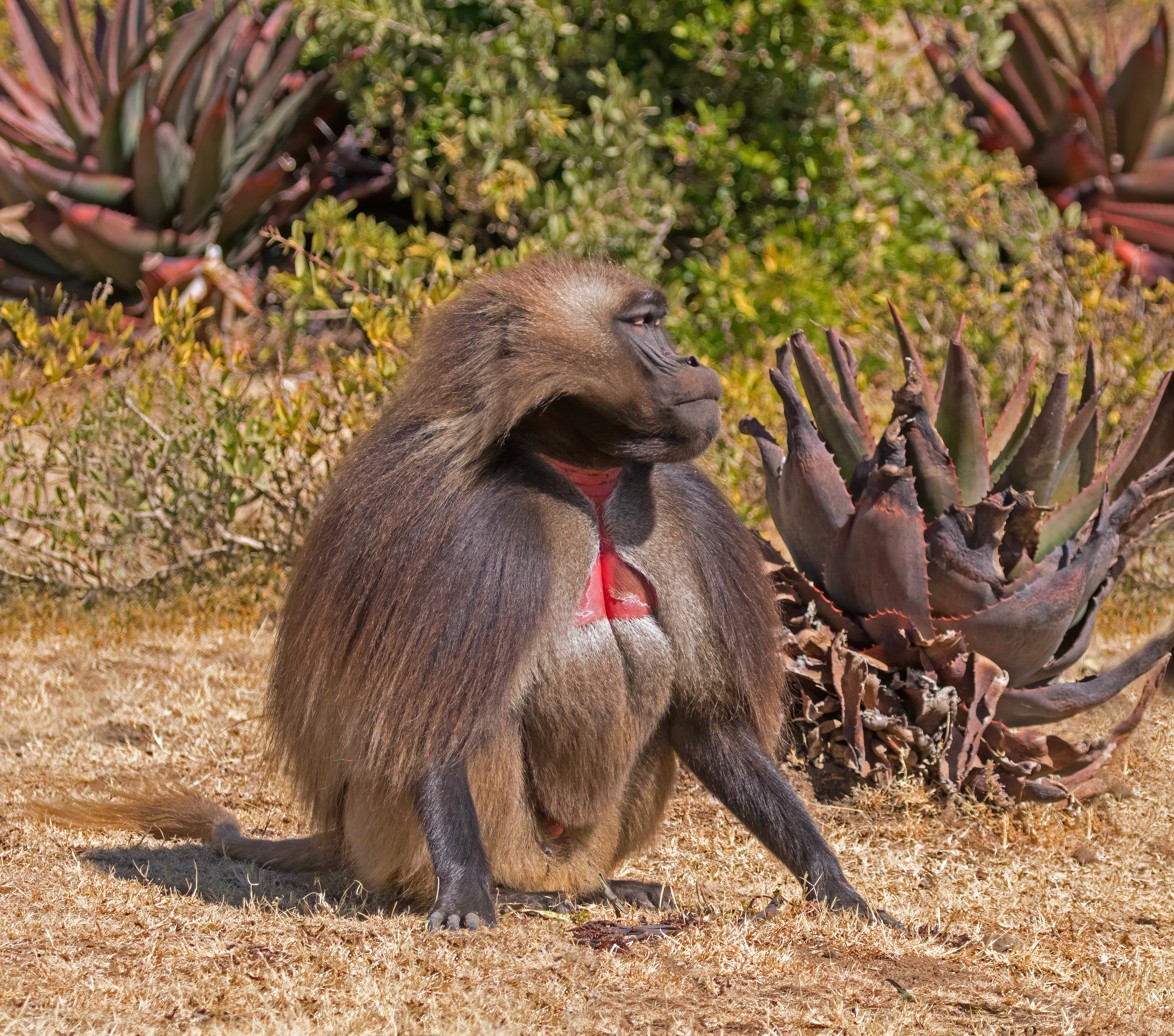
- Male gelada

Scientific classification
- Domain: Eukaryota
- Kingdom: Animalia
- Phylum: Chordata
- Class: Mammalia
- Order: Primates
- Suborder: Haplorhini
- Infraorder: Simiiformes
- Family: Cercopithecidae
- Subfamily: Cercopithecinae
- Tribe: Papionini
- Genus: Theropithecus; I. Geoffroy, 1843

Type species
- Theropithecus gelada (Rüppell, 1835)

Species
- See text

= Theropithecus =

Theropithecus Temporal range: Pliocene-Recent 4.1–0 Ma

Genus of Old World monkeys

Theropithecus is a genus of primates in the family Cercopithecidae. It contains a single living species, the gelada (Theropithecus gelada), native to the Ethiopian Highlands.

Additional species are known from fossils, including:

- †Theropithecus brumpti
- †Theropithecus darti
- †Theropithecus oswaldi

The earliest remains probably belonging to the genus are from Kanapoi, Kenya, dating to the early Pliocene, around 4.1-4.2 million years ago.

Although most remains are known from Africa, during the Early Pleistocene the genus had a broader distribution ranging from southern Europe, including Spain and possibly Italy, to the Indian subcontinent.
