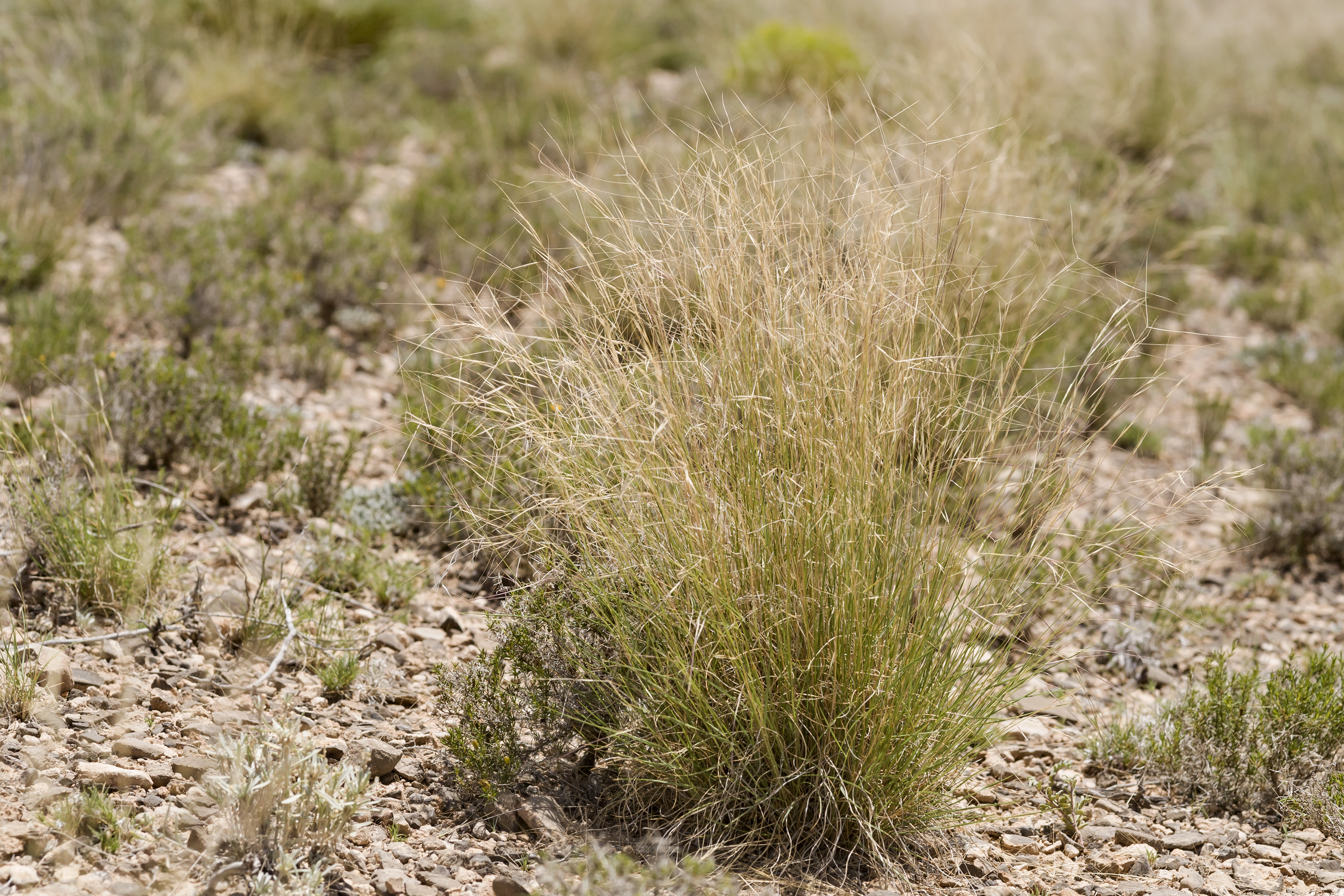
- Habit
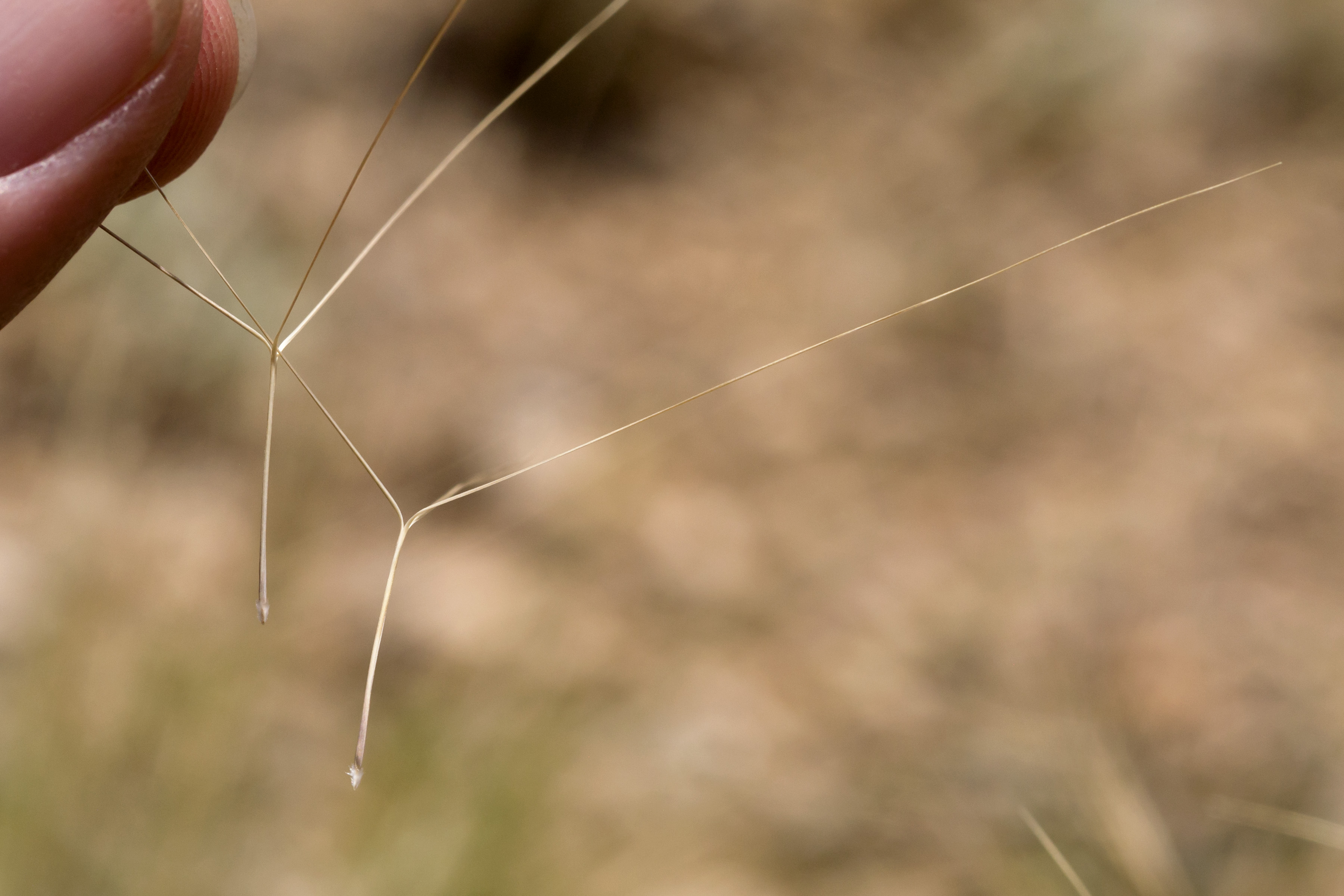
- Close-up of awns

Scientific classification
- Kingdom: Plantae
- Clade: Embryophytes
- Clade: Tracheophytes
- Clade: Angiosperms
- Clade: Monocots
- Clade: Commelinids
- Order: Poales
- Family: Poaceae
- Genus: Aristida
- Species: A. longiseta

Binomial name
- Aristida longiseta Steud.

Synonyms
- List: Aristida curtiseta Buckley; Aristida fasciculata var. nuttallii Beal; Aristida longiseta var. rariflora (Hitchc.) Hitchc.; Aristida longiseta subsp. rariflora Hitchc.; Aristida longiseta var. robusta Merr.; Aristida pallens Pursh; Aristida purpurea var. longiseta (Steud.) Vasey; Aristida purpurea var. robusta (Merr.) A.H.Holmgren & N.H.Holmgren; Aristida purpurea subsp. robusta (Merr.) Piper; Aristida rariflora (Hitchc.) Henrard

= Aristida longiseta =

Species of plant

Aristida longiseta, the red three-awn, is a species of flowering plant in the family Poaceae. Most authorities consider it a synonym of Aristida purpurea var. longiseta. It is native to western North America; western Canada, the United States west of the Mississippi, and northern Mexico. A perennial, it is typically found in rocky and sandy areas.
