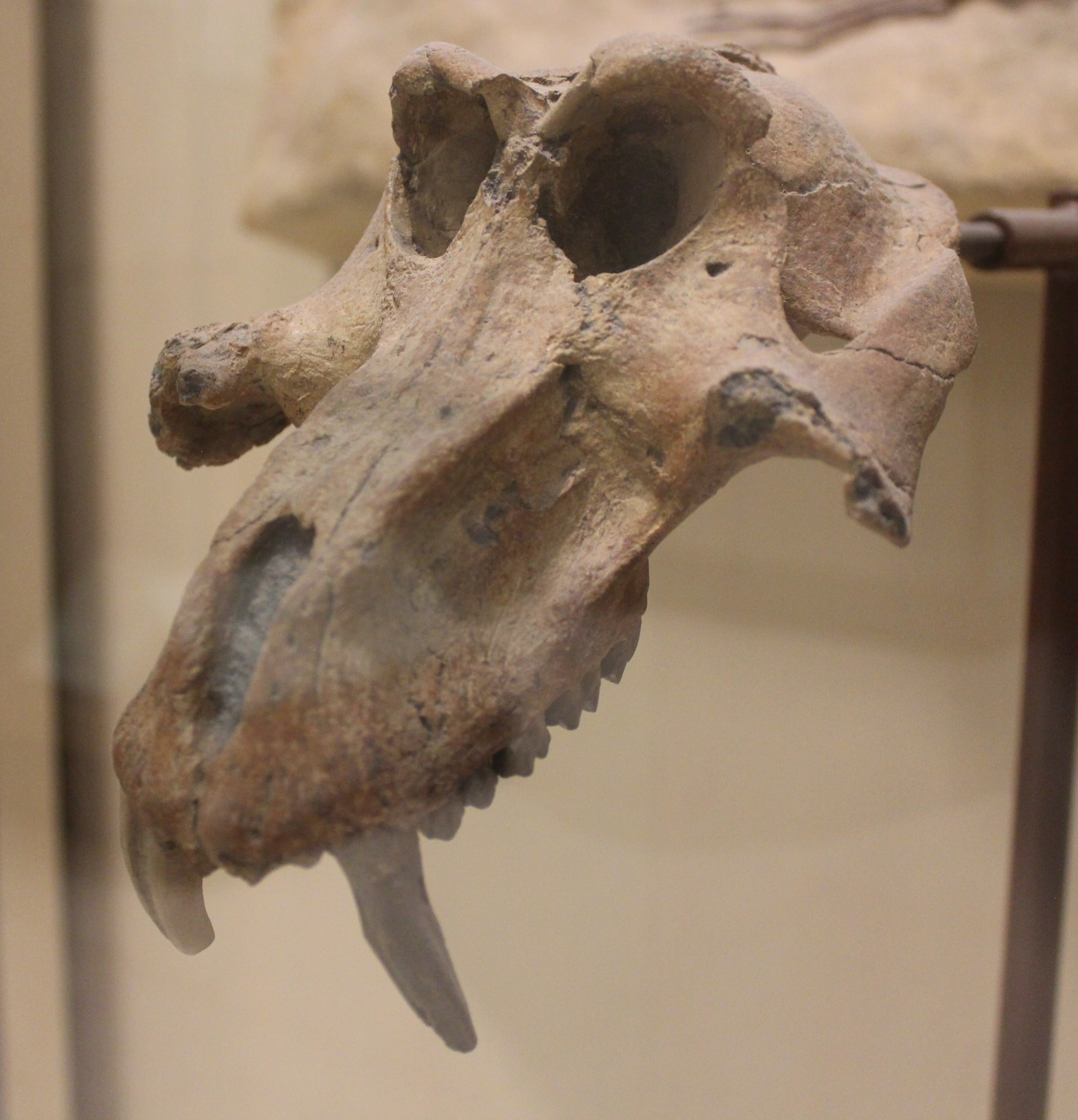
- Skull cast of T. brumpti

Scientific classification
- Kingdom: Animalia
- Phylum: Chordata
- Class: Mammalia
- Infraclass: Placentalia
- Order: Primates
- Family: Cercopithecidae
- Genus: Theropithecus
- Species: †T. brumpti

Binomial name
- †Theropithecus brumpti Arambourg, 1947

= Theropithecus brumpti =

Theropithecus brumpti Temporal range: 3.3–2.0 Ma Pliocene

Extinct species of Old World monkey

Theropithecus brumpti was a large terrestrial monkey that lived in the mid- to late Pliocene. It is an extinct species of papionin.

This fossil primate is mostly known from skulls and mandibles found in Pliocene deposits excavated in the Shungura Formation, at the Omo River, Ethiopia. Both T. brumpti and the related extant gelada (T. gelada) were related to the various baboon species.

== Description ==
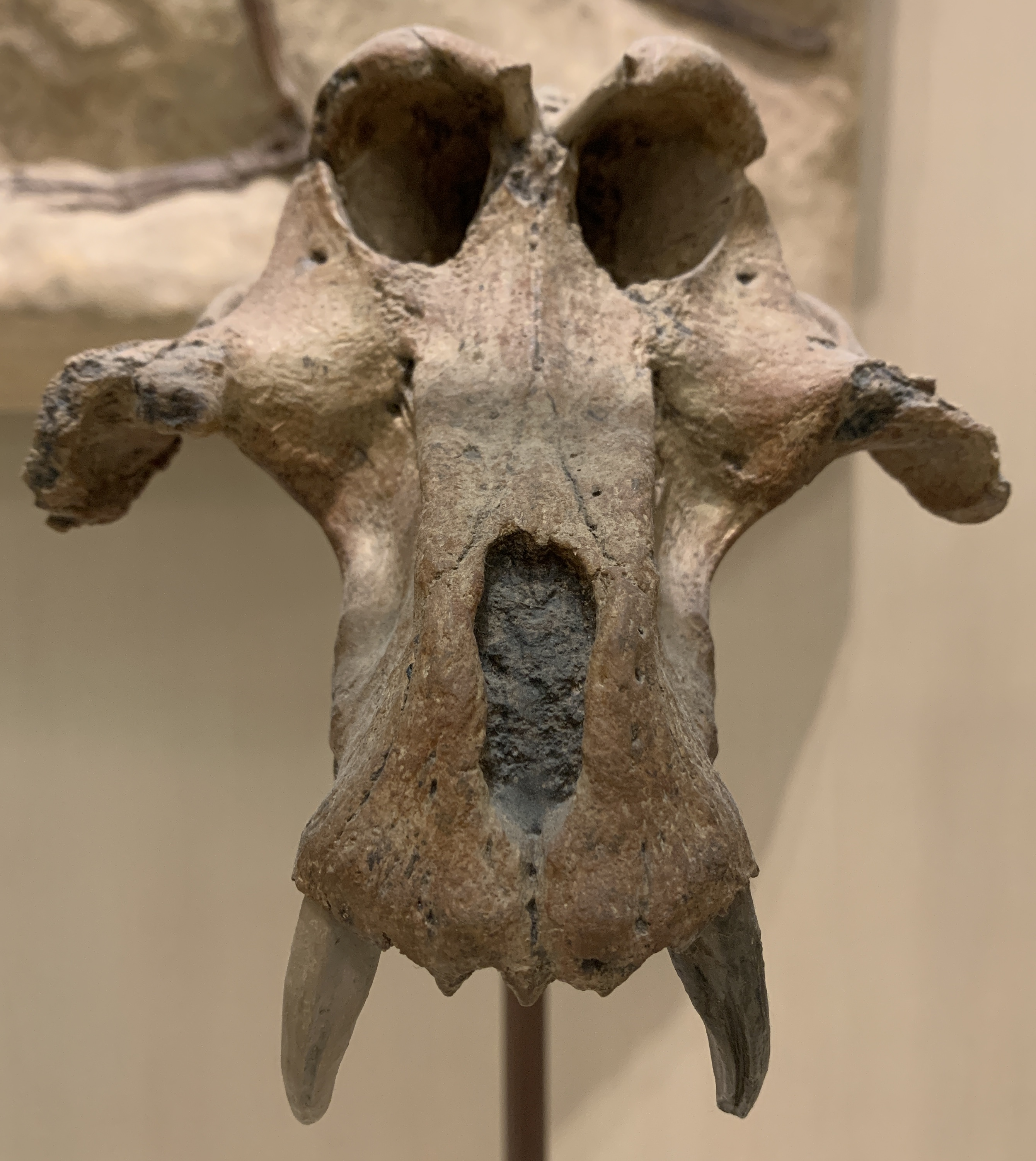
T. brumpti skull cast of a specimen from Ethiopia, at the AMNH

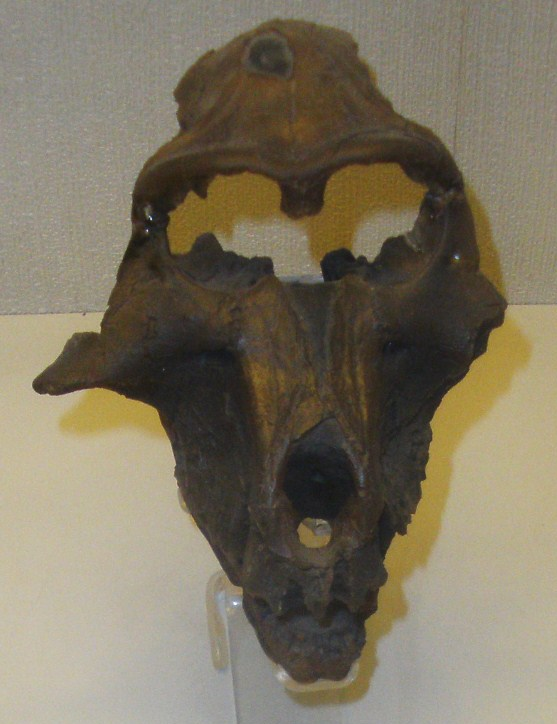
Skull

Similar to most other such animals, T. brumpti was quadrupedal with highly dexterous, manipulative hands. Males grew very large, as evidenced by a specimen found at Lomekwi, Kenya, which was estimated to have weighed about 44 kg (100 lb). In comparison, the male gelada averages around 20 kilograms. In addition, the male was most likely very colourful, with the female smaller and less colorful; the species displayed a high degree of sexual dimorphism. Like most papionins, the male possessed large canine teeth, primarily for display.

== Diet ==
T. brumpti has been assumed to be a folivore. Large muscles in the long muzzle suggest T. brumpti ate tough vegetation, and was capable of breaking and eating large nuts. An analysis of δ^{13}C and δ^{44/42}Ca values in T. brumpti has found that it occupied a wide dietary niche, grazing in open environments but also venturing into more mixed environments. This analysis also found evidence that its diet included bone.

== Habitat ==
This species was largely terrestrial, with the size of adult males making any significant arboreal lifestyle unlikely. From the locations of T. brumpti finds, the species lived in riverine forest habitats.
