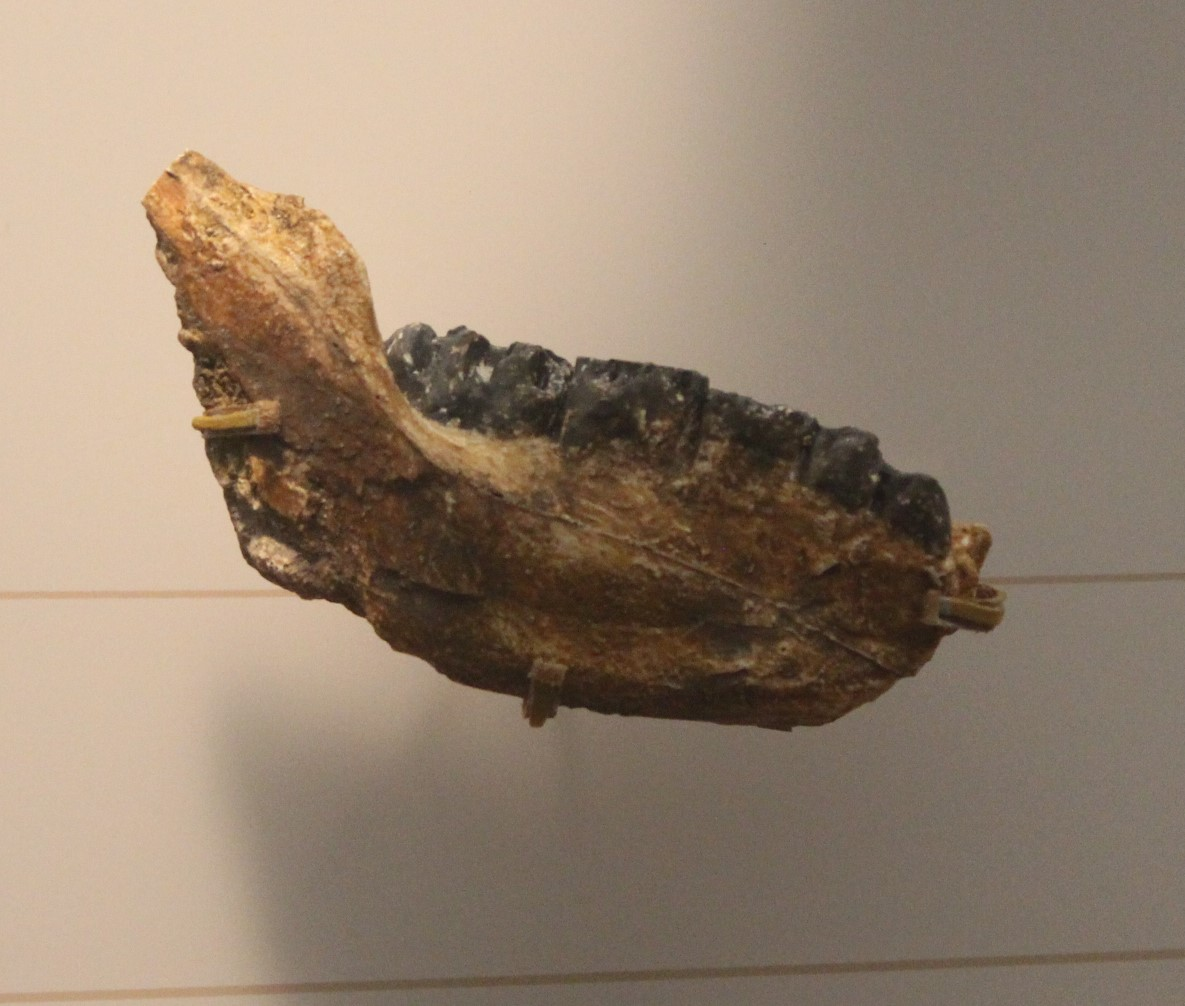
- Fragmented jaw

Scientific classification
- Kingdom: Animalia
- Phylum: Chordata
- Class: Mammalia
- Infraclass: Placentalia
- Order: Primates
- Family: Cercopithecidae
- Genus: Theropithecus
- Species: †T. oswaldi

Binomial name
- †Theropithecus oswaldi (Andrews, 1916)

Subspecies
- †T. o. delsoni; † T. o. ecki; † T. o. oswaldi

Synonyms
- Theropithecus atlanticus; Simopithecus oswaldi Andrews, 1916; Simopithecus jonathoni

= Theropithecus oswaldi =

Theropithecus oswaldi Temporal range: Early to Middle Pleistocene 1 Million years ago

Extinct species of Old World monkey

Theropithecus oswaldi is an extinct species of Theropithecus from the Early to Middle Pleistocene of Kenya, Ethiopia, Tanzania, South Africa, Spain, Morocco, Algeria, and India. The species went extinct in South Africa around 1 million years ago. Having existed alongside hominins like Homo erectus, conflict with early humans likely played a role in their extinction, as a site has been found with many juveniles butchered.

== Description ==
It is remarkable for its large size compared to other Old World monkeys. One source projects a specimen of Theropithecus oswaldi to have weighed 72 kg (159 lb). Postcranial fossils found of this species are much greater in size than extant papionins, including the mandrill.

== Palaeoecology ==
According to δ^{13}C values from fossils of the species from Swartkrans, T. oswaldi was a specialised grazer. A dental microwear study of T. oswaldi specimens from Swartkrans found that their dietary patterns were similar to geladas, yellow baboons, and mantled guerezas and would have included leaves and grasses in addition to fruits. A different dental microwear study based on fossils from the Omo Valley suggests that the diet of T. oswaldi, like that of the modern day gelada, consisted primarily of the aerial parts of herbaceous monocots and dicots. Yet another dental microwear study of T. oswaldi from Ahl al Oughlam in Morocco also evidenced that it primarily ate grasses. T. oswaldi fossils are also known from Elandsfontein, where they subsided on diets mainly composed of C_{3} plants as both browsers and grazers.
