= Theropithecus darti =

Theropithecus darti Temporal range: Pliocene

Scientific classification
- Kingdom: Animalia
- Phylum: Chordata
- Class: Mammalia
- Order: Primates
- Family: Cercopithecidae
- Genus: Theropithecus
- Species: †T. darti

Binomial name
- †Theropithecus darti Broom & Jensen, 1946

Extinct species of Old World monkey

Theropithecus darti skull drawing

Theropithecus darti is an extinct species of Theropithecus from the middle to late Pliocene of Africa.
