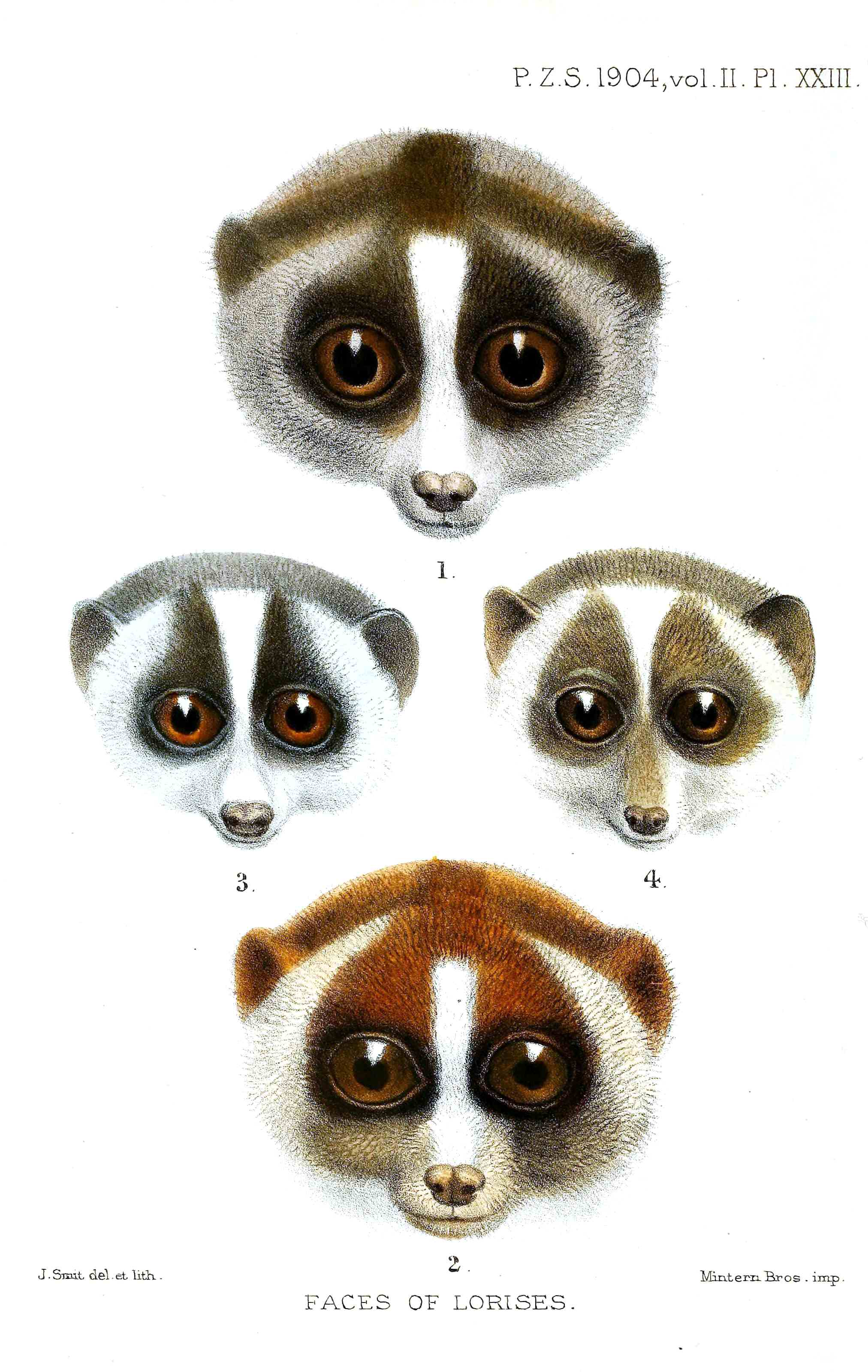
- Joseph Smit's Faces of Lorises (1904)

Scientific classification
- Kingdom: Animalia
- Phylum: Chordata
- Class: Mammalia
- Infraclass: Placentalia
- Order: Primates
- Suborder: Strepsirrhini
- Family: Lorisidae
- Subfamily: Lorinae; Gray, 1821

Genera
- Loris; Nycticebus; Xanthonycticebus

Synonyms
- Lorisinae

= Loris =

Lorises Temporal range: Miocene to present

Subfamily of primates

Loris is the common name for the wet-nosed primates of the subfamily Lorinae (sometimes spelled Lorisinae) in the family Lorisidae. Loris is one genus in this subfamily and includes the slender lorises, Nycticebus is the genus containing the slow lorises, and Xanthonycticebus is the genus name of the pygmy slow loris.

== Description ==
Lorises are nocturnal and arboreal. They are found in tropical and woodland forests of India, Sri Lanka, and parts of southeast Asia. They resemble lemurs. A loris's locomotion is a slow and cautious climbing form of quadrupedalism. Some lorises are almost entirely insectivorous, while others also include fruits, gums, leaves, and slugs in their diet.

Lorises are strepsirrhines, most of which have a toothcomb, a special adaptation in their lower front teeth. This toothcomb is used for grooming their fur and even injecting their venom.

Female lorises practice infant parking, leaving their infants in trees or bushes. Before they do this, they bathe their young with allergenic saliva that is acquired by licking patches on the insides of their elbows which produce a mild toxin that discourages most predators, though orangutans occasionally eat lorises.

== Taxonomic classification ==
The family Lorisidae is found within the infraorder Lemuriformes and superfamily Lorisoidea, along with the family Galagidae, the galagos. This superfamily is a sister taxon of Lemuroidea, the lemurs. Within Lorinae, there are ten species (and several more subspecies) of lorises across three genera:

- Family Lorisidae
  - Subfamily Perodicticinae
  - Subfamily Lorinae
    - Genus Loris
      - Gray slender loris, Loris lydekkerianus
        - Highland slender loris, L. lydekkerianus grandis
        - Mysore slender loris, L. lydekkerianus lydekkerianus
        - Malabar slender loris, L. lydekkerianus malabaricus
        - Northern Ceylonese slender loris, L. lydekkerianus nordicus
      - Red slender loris, L. tardigradus
        - Dry Zone slender loris, L. tardigradus tardigradus
        - Horton Plains slender loris, L. tardigradus nyctoceboides
    - Genus Xanthonycticebus
      - Pygmy slow loris, X. pygmaeus
    - Genus Nycticebus
      - Bangka slow loris, Nycticebus bancanus
      - Bengal slow loris, N. bengalensis
      - Bornean slow loris, N. borneanus
      - Sunda slow loris, N. coucang
      - Javan slow loris, N. javanicus
      - Kayan River slow loris, N. kayan
      - Philippine slow loris, N. menagensis
      - Sumatran slow loris, N. hilleri
      - †? N. linglom (fossil, Miocene)
