= Bornean slow loris (disambiguation) =

The Bornean slow loris (Nycticebus borneanus) is a strepsirrhine primate and a species of slow loris that is native to Borneo in Indonesia.

Bornean slow loris may also refer to other slow lorises of Borneo that once shared that common name, including:

- Nycticebus bancanus, the Bangka slow loris
- Nycticebus kayan, the Kayan River slow loris
- Nycticebus menagensis, the Philippine slow loris
