= ? Nycticebus linglom =

? Nycticebus linglom Temporal range: ~18 Ma

Scientific classification
- Kingdom: Animalia
- Phylum: Chordata
- Class: Mammalia
- Order: Primates
- Suborder: Strepsirrhini
- Family: Lorisidae
- Subfamily: Lorinae
- Genus: Nycticebus (?)
- Species: ? N. linglom

Binomial name
- ? Nycticebus linglom Mein & Ginsburg, 1997

Possible extinct species of primate

? Nycticebus linglom is a fossil strepsirrhine primate from the Miocene of Thailand. Known only from a single tooth, an upper third molar, it is thought to be related to the living slow lorises (genus Nycticebus), but the material is not sufficient to assign the species to Nycticebus with certainty, and the species name therefore uses open nomenclature. With a width of 1.82 mm, this tooth is very small for a primate. It is triangular in shape, supported by a single root, and shows three main cusps, in addition to various crests. The absence of a fourth cusp, the hypocone, distinguishes it from various other prosimian primates.

== Taxonomy ==
? Nycticebus linglom was described in 1997 by French paleontologists Pierre Mein and Léonard Ginsburg in a report on the fossil mammals of Li Mae Long, a Miocene site in Thailand, about 17–18 million years old. The animal is known from a single tooth, and on the basis of comparisons with other prosimian primates Mein and Ginsburg concluded that it is most closely related to the living slow lorises (genus Nycticebus). However, in view of the very limited material, they only tentatively assigned the fossil species to Nycticebus, using open nomenclature. The specific name, linglom, is the Thai word for "loris".

== Description ==
The single known tooth, a third upper molar (M3) known as T Li 41, is tiny, with a length of 1.29 mm and width of 1.82 mm. Mein and Ginsburg claim that it is the smallest known prosimian molar. The tooth is triangular in shape and shows a simple, reduced morphology. Three important cusps—the protocone, paracone, and metacone—are present, connected by a crest. They are low and rounded. The metacone, located at the back of the tooth, is closer to the protocone, which is on the front lingual corner (the side of the tongue), than it is to the paracone on the front labial corner (the side of the cheeks). The protocone is rounded on the lingual side and is attached to a weak crest on the front and back. On the front labial corner, a lengthy crest, the parastylar crest, is present, which includes a minor cusp known as a parastyle. Some wear is visible on the parastylar crest, and at the front of the tooth where a contact facet with the preceding second upper molar is present. The tooth has a single, well-developed root, which contains a number of grooves, suggesting that it consists of three smaller, fused rootlets.

? Nycticebus linglom is much smaller than the fossil sivaladapine primates, and unlike tarsier M3s, the single known fossil is reduced in form and lacks a fourth main cusp, a hypocone. With its reduced, triangular form, it more closely resembles lorises (family Lorisidae), but the absence of a hypocone also distinguishes it from the slender lorises (Loris), the angwantibos (Arctocebus), and the pygmy slow loris (Nycticebus pygmaeus). The fossil genus Nycticeboides lacks the rounded lingual face of the protocone seen in ? N. linglom and possesses additional cuspules. However, ? N. linglom strongly resembles the Bengal slow loris (Nycticebus bengalensis), from which it is distinguished by its smaller size and fused roots. Nekaris and Nijman (2022), when applying the name Xanthonycticebus to the pygmy slow loris, discussed the similarities and differences of T Li 4, and concluded that for now it is best retained as ? N. linglom.

== Range and ecology ==
Li Mae Long, the collection site of ? N. linglom, is dated to the latest Early Miocene, corresponding to the European zone MN 4, around 18 mya. It is in the Thai province of Lamphun. The fossil fauna encompasses 34 species of mammals, including the tarsier Hesperotarsius thailandicus and the treeshrew Tupaia miocenica. Mein and Ginsburg conclude that the fauna represents a tropical forest environment close to a shallow lake.

== Literature cited ==
- Harrison, T. 2010. Later Tertiary Lorisiformes (Strepsirrhini, Primates). Pp. 333–349 in Werdelin, L. and Sanders, W.J. (eds.). Cenozoic Mammals of Africa. University of California Press, 1008 pp.
- Mein, P. and Ginsburg, L. 1997. Les mammifères du gisement miocène inférieur de Li Mae Long, Thaïlande : systématique, biostratigraphie et paléoenvironnement. Geodiversitas 19(4):783–844 (in French). Abstract in French and English.
- Zijlstra, J.S., Flynn, L.J. and Wessels, W. 2013. The westernmost tarsier: A new genus and species from the Miocene of Pakistan. Journal of Human Evolution 65:544-550.
