= Tupaia miocenica =

Tupaia miocenica Temporal range: ~18 mya

Scientific classification
- Kingdom: Animalia
- Phylum: Chordata
- Class: Mammalia
- Order: Scandentia
- Family: Tupaiidae
- Genus: Tupaia
- Species: †T. miocenica

Binomial name
- †Tupaia miocenica Mein & Ginsburg, 1997

Extinct species of mammal

Tupaia miocenica is a fossil treeshrew from the Miocene of Thailand. Known only from a single tooth, an upper first or second molar, it is among the few known fossil treeshrews. With a length of 3.57 mm, the tooth is large for a treeshrew. At the back lingual corner (the side of the tongue), the tooth shows a small cusp, the hypocone, that is separated from the protocone in front of it by a narrow valley. The condition of the hypocone distinguishes this species from various other treeshrews. In addition, the presence of a well-developed but simple mesostyle (a small cuspule) is distinctive.

== Taxonomy ==
Tupaia miocenica was described in 1997 by French paleontologists Pierre Mein and Léonard Ginsburg in a report on the fossil mammals of Li Mae Long, a Miocene site in Thailand. The animal is known from a single tooth, which according to Mein and Ginsburg's comparisons most closely resembles the living treeshrews of the genus Tupaia. The specific name, miocenica, refers to the animal's occurrence during the Miocene. Only a few other fossil treeshrews are known, and T. miocenica is the only fossil species from Thailand. When it was described, it was the only Miocene representative of Tupaia, but a second species, Tupaia storchi, was named from the Late Miocene of Lufeng, China, in 2012.

== Description ==
The single known tooth, a worn left upper molar known as T Li 175, is large for a treeshrew, with a length of 3.57 mm and width of 4.79 mm. Although Mein and Ginsburg described it a second upper molar (M2), Ni and Qiu argued in 2012 that it is more likely a first upper molar (M1). It is dilambdodont (with a W-shaped chewing surface) and the labial surface (the side of the cheeks) is concave and bears a cingular crest. A well-developed small cusp, a mesostyle, is present on the labial side. The presence of the mesostyle distinguishes the animal from Ptilocercus, the only member of the treeshrew family Ptilocercidae. The lingual (tongue) side is narrow. A large cusp, the protocone, is on the front lingual corner. Two crests descend from it; one reaches the paracone on the front labial side and another approaches the metacone to the back of the tooth. A smaller cusp, a hypocone, is on the back lingual corner. This feature distinguishes T. miocenica both from the treeshrew genera Dendrogale, Prodendrogale, and Palaeotupaia, which lack the cusp entirely, and from Anathana and Urogale, which have a large hypocone. In T. miocenica the back and lingual sides of the hypocone are straight and form a right angle with each other. The tooth most closely resembles Tupaia species with a simple mesostyle, such as the common treeshrew (Tupaia glis). However, this species is smaller and unlike in T. miocenica, the hypocone is not isolated from the protocone by a narrow valley.

== Range and ecology ==
Li Mae Long, the collection site of T. miocenica, is dated to the latest Early Miocene, corresponding to the European zone MN 4, around 18 mya. It is in the Thai province of Lamphun. The fossil fauna encompasses 34 species of mammals, including the tarsier Hesperotarsius thailandicus, the rodent Diatomys liensis, the slow loris ? Nycticebus linglom, and the metatherian Siamoperadectes. Mein and Ginsburg conclude that the fauna represents a tropical forest environment close to a shallow lake.

== Literature cited ==
- Helgen, K.M. 2005. Order Scandentia. Pp. 104–109 in Wilson, D.E. and Reeder, D.M. (eds.). Mammal Species of the World: a taxonomic and geographic reference. 3rd ed. Baltimore: The Johns Hopkins University Press, 2 vols., 2142 pp. ISBN 978-0-8018-8221-0
- Mein, P. and Ginsburg, L. 1997. Les mammifères du gisement miocène inférieur de Li Mae Long, Thaïlande : systématique, biostratigraphie et paléoenvironnement. Geodiversitas 19(4):783–844 (in French). Abstract in French and English.
- Ni, X. and Qiu, Z. 2012. Tupaiine tree shrews (Scandentia, Mammalia) from the Yuanmou Lufengpithecus locality of Yunnan, China (subscription required). Swiss Journal of Palaeontology 131(1):51–60.
- Sargis, E.J. 2004. New views on tree shrews: The role of Tupaiids in primate supraordinal relationships (subscription required). Evolutionary Anthropology: Issues, News, and Reviews 13(2):56–66.
