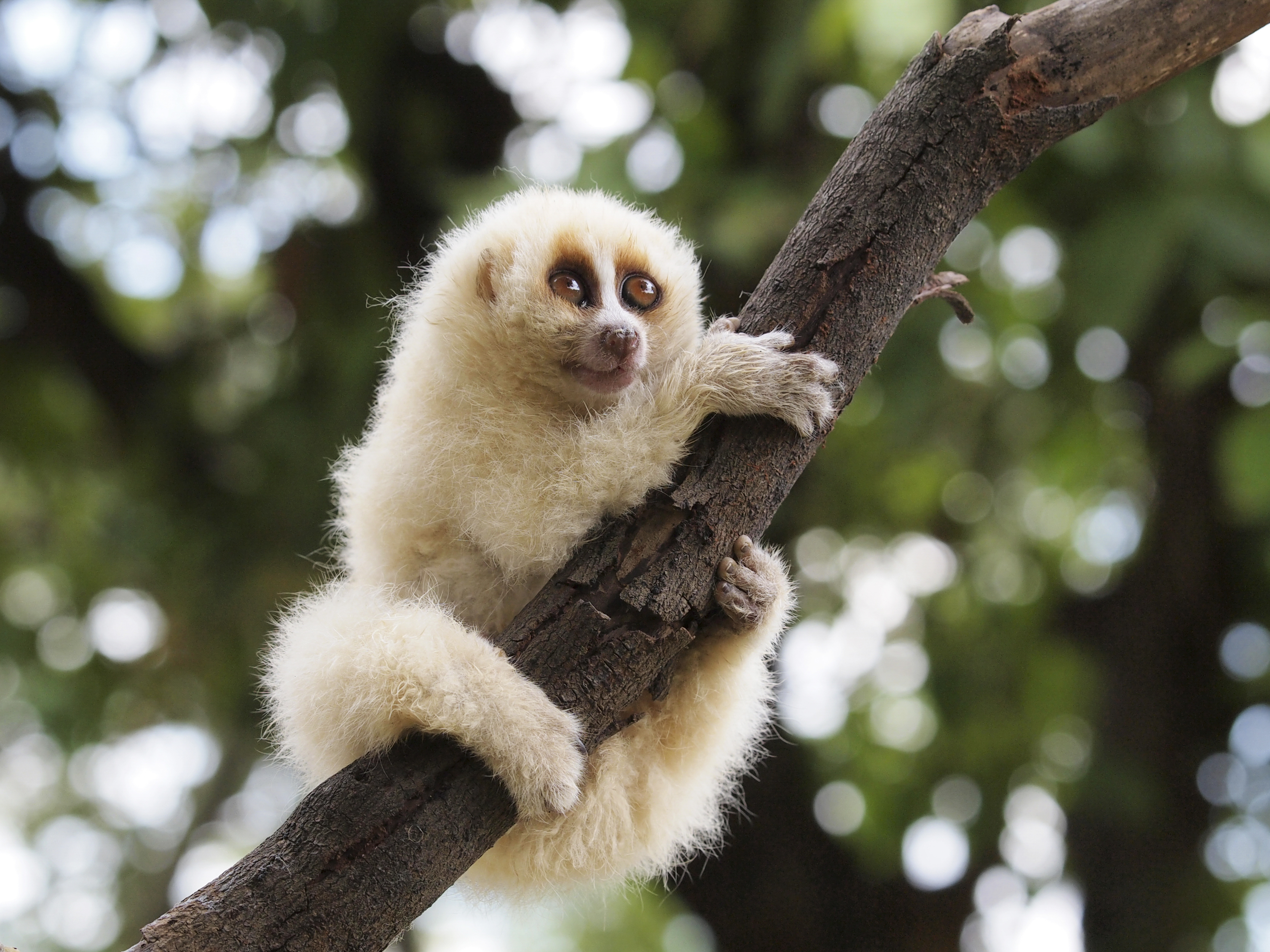

Conservation status
- Critically Endangered (IUCN 3.1)
- CITES Appendix I

Scientific classification
- Kingdom: Animalia
- Phylum: Chordata
- Class: Mammalia
- Order: Primates
- Suborder: Strepsirrhini
- Family: Lorisidae
- Genus: Nycticebus
- Species: N. javanicus

Binomial name
- Nycticebus javanicus É. Geoffroy, 1812
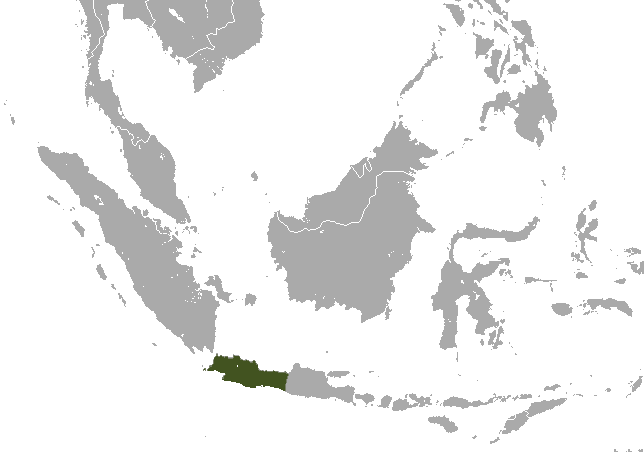
- Range of the Javan slow loris

Synonyms
- Nycticebus ornatus Thomas, 1921

= Javan slow loris =

Species of primate native to Indonesia

The Javan slow loris (Nycticebus javanicus) is a strepsirrhine primate and a species of slow loris native to the western and central portions of the island of Java, in Indonesia. Although originally described as a separate species, it was considered a subspecies of the Sunda slow loris (N. coucang) for many years, until reassessments of its morphology and genetics in the 2000s resulted in its promotion to full species status. It is most closely related to the Sunda slow loris and the Bengal slow loris (N. bengalensis). The species has two forms, based on hair length and, to a lesser extent, coloration.

Its forehead has a prominent white diamond pattern, which consists of a distinct stripe that runs over its head and forks towards the eyes and ears. The Javan slow loris weighs between 565 and 687 g (1.25 and 1.51 lb) and has a head-body length of about 293 mm (11.5 in). Like all lorises, it is arboreal and moves slowly across vines and lianas instead of jumping from tree to tree. Its habitat includes primary and secondary forests, but it can also be found in bamboo and mangrove forests, and on chocolate plantations. Its diet typically consists of fruit, tree gum, lizards, and eggs. It sleeps on exposed branches, sometimes in groups, and is usually seen alone or in pairs.

The Javan slow loris population is in sharp decline because of poaching for the exotic pet trade, and sometimes for traditional medicine. Remaining populations have low densities, and habitat loss is a major threat. For these reasons, the International Union for Conservation of Nature (IUCN) lists its status as critically endangered, and it has also been included on the 2008–2010 list of "The World's 25 Most Endangered Primates". It is protected by Indonesian law and, since June 2007, is listed under CITES Appendix I. Despite these protections, as well as its presence in several protected areas, poaching continues; the wildlife protection laws are rarely enforced at the local level.

== Taxonomy and phylogeny ==
The Javan slow loris was first described scientifically by Étienne Geoffroy Saint-Hilaire in 1812. The species name javanicus refers to its place of origin. However, the species was not recognized for long; by 1840, René Primevère Lesson classified it as one of several varieties of a single species of slow loris, which he called Bradylemur tardigradus. In 1921, Oldfield Thomas named a second species of slow loris from Java, Nycticebus ornatus.

In his 1971 review of slow loris taxonomy, taxonomist and primatologist Colin Groves recognized the Javan slow loris as a subspecies of the Sunda slow loris (N. coucang) under the name Nycticebus coucang javanicus, with ornatus as a synonym. It was first recognized as a distinct species again in a 2000 Indonesian field guide on primates by Jatna Supriatna and Edy Hendras Wahyono. In 2008, Groves and Ibnu Maryanto promoted it to species status, based on an analysis of cranial morphology and characteristics of its fur. Molecular analysis of DNA sequences of the D-loop and cytochrome b genes demonstrated it to be genetically distinct from other slow loris species; phylogenetically, it is a sister species to a clade containing the Bengal slow loris (N. bengalensis) and the Sunda slow loris. Due to its close resemblance to neighboring slow loris species, even rescue centers have been known to misidentify it.

There are two forms of the Javan slow loris, distinguished mainly by differences in hair length. These have occasionally been recognized as separate species, N. javanicus and N. ornatus, but are currently both classified as a single species, although their exact taxonomic status remains unclear.

== Description ==
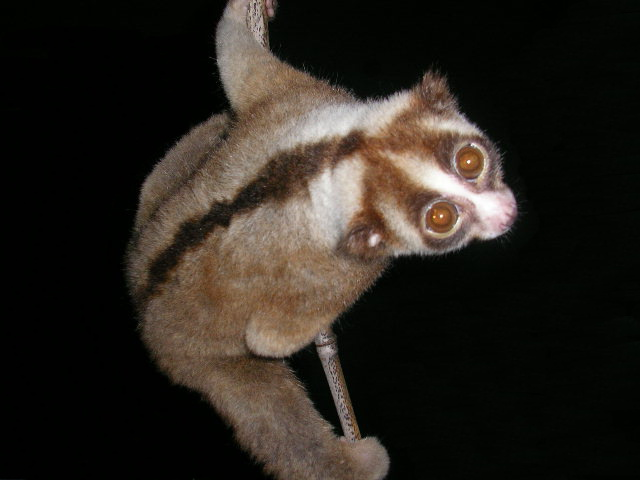
The Javan slow loris has a distinct stripe that runs the length of its back and forks at the crown, leading to the eyes and ears.

The Javan slow loris weighs between 565 and 687 g (19.9 and 24.2 oz) and is similar in appearance to the largest slow loris, the Bengal slow loris. Its face and back are marked with a distinct stripe that runs over the crown and forks, leading to the eyes and ears, which leaves a white diamond pattern on the forehead. Its color is yellowish-gray. In contrast, its head, neck, and shoulders have cream hues. Like the Bornean slow loris (N. menagensis), it lacks the second incisor (I^{2}) in its dentition.

The Javan slow loris is larger than both of the other Indonesian slow lorises, the Sunda slow loris and the Bornean slow loris. Based on averages determined from six specimens obtained from the illegal wildlife trade in Java, other morphometric parameters are as follows: 59.2 mm (2.33 in) head length; 19.9 mm (0.78 in) snout length; 43.6 mm (1.72 in) head breadth; 250.8 mm (9.87 in) body breadth; 293.1 mm (11.54 in) head and body length; 190.8 mm (7.51 in) chest girth; 48.0 mm (1.89 in) dark percentage girth measured with dark dorsal hair, as a percent of girth circumference; 136.7 mm (5.38 in) neck circumference; 20.4 mm (0.80 in) long tail; 67.2 mm (2.65 in) long humerus; 71.8 mm (2.83 in) long radius bone; 83.2 mm (3.28 in) long femur; 85.9 mm (3.38 in) long tibia; hand span of 59.1 mm (2.33 in); foot span of 70.3 mm (2.77 in); and 16.8 mm (0.66 in) long ears.

The ornatus morphotype is most reliably distinguished by its longer fur, averaging 26.8 mm (1.06 in) compared to 22.4 mm (0.88 in) in javanicus. Other distinguishing characteristics include overall color (generally light brown in ornatus compared with brown to reddish in javanicus), and amount of brown coloring in the fur (ornatus has less brown than javanicus, resulting in a lighter-colored ventral region).

In the 1860s, the brain of the Javan slow loris was examined by William Henry Flower, a comparative anatomist who specialized in the primate brain. In addition to detailing the organization, shape, and measurements of its brain, he noted that the form and surface markings were comparable to that of lemurs. He argued against grouping strepsirrhines with Insectivora (a now-abandoned biological grouping) and noted that the brain had features transitional between other primates and "inferior" mammals such as bats and carnivorans.

== Behavior and ecology ==
Like other lorises, the Javan slow loris is nocturnal and arboreal, relying on vines and lianas. However, the animal has been observed moving on the ground to cross open spaces in disturbed habitat. It moves through the canopy at heights between 3 and 22 m (10 and 72 ft) and is often encountered at heights between 1.5 and 9.5 m (5 and 31 ft).

The Javan slow loris will eat fruit, lizards, eggs, and chocolate seeds. It is also known to eat the gum of trees of the genus Albizia, in the legume family, Fabaceae, as well as from the palm genus Arenga (family Arecaceae). Javan slow lorises are seen alone or in pairs and are sometimes found sleeping in groups. Instead of sleeping in nest holes, they sleep curled up on branches. Like other slow lorises, the Javan slow loris has a distinctive call that resembles a high-frequency whistle. The species is a host for the parasitic flatworm, Phaneropsolus oviforme.

== Distribution ==
The species is found only on the western and central portion of the island of Java in Indonesia. Its presence has been confirmed in the Dieng Mountains, and it is known to be found in low densities at Gunung Gede Pangrango National Park (in montane cloud forests) and Mount Halimun Salak National Park, often only where human disturbance is minimal. It inhabits both primary and secondary disturbed forest, and can be found from sea level to 1,600 m (5,200 ft), although it is more commonly found at higher elevations since lower elevations tend to be deforested. A study in 2000 showed that in addition to primary and secondary forest, the Javan slow loris could be found in bamboo forests, mangrove forests, and on plantations—particularly chocolate plantations. In 2008, they were observed in West Java to occupy mixed-crop home gardens, tolerating high levels of human disturbance.

== Conservation ==
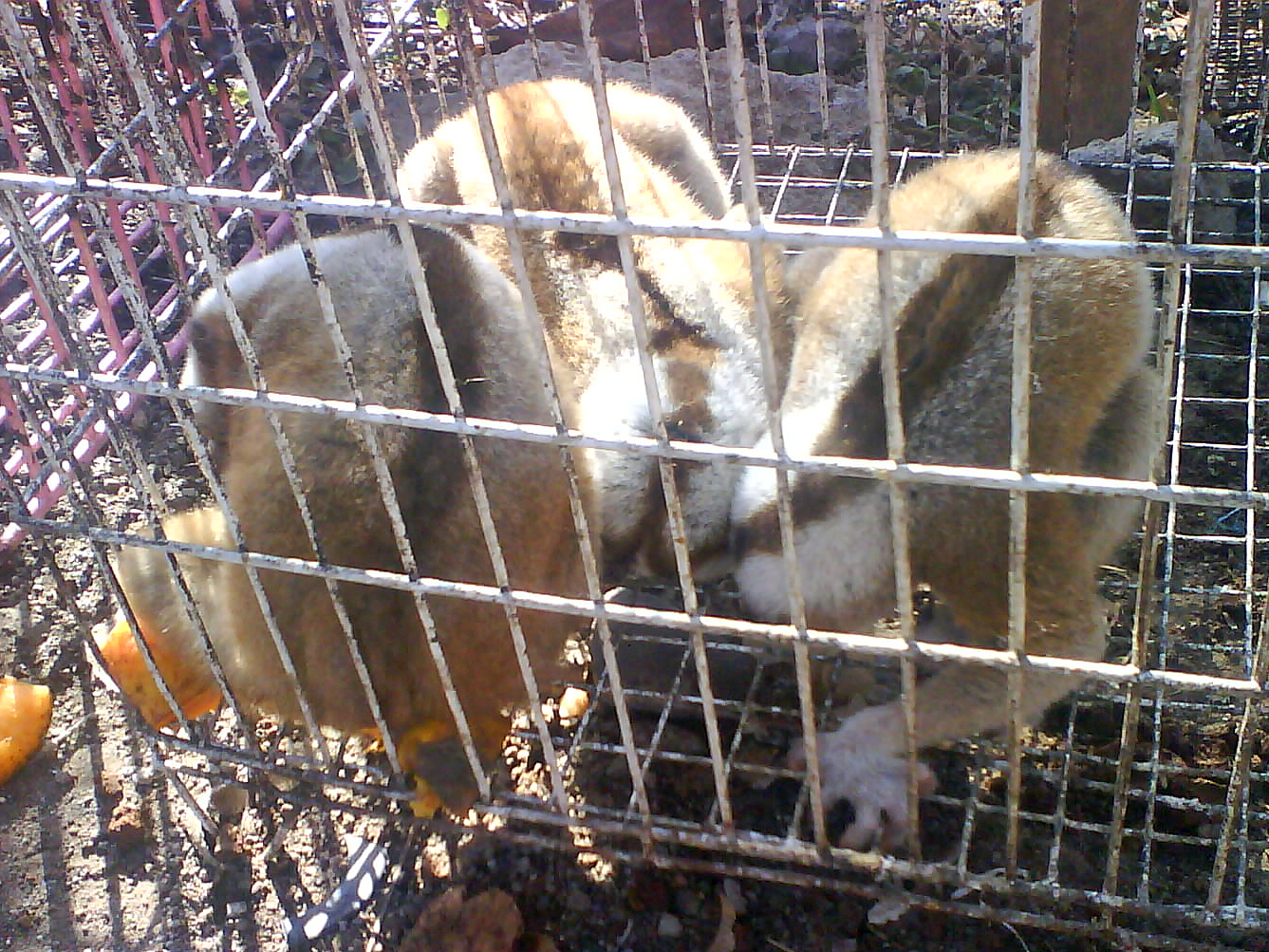
The Javan slow loris is commonly sold as a pet in the markets of Indonesia, despite local laws and CITES Appendix I protection.

The Javan slow loris is listed by the International Union for Conservation of Nature (IUCN) as "critically endangered," primarily due to a rapid decline in population. For the 21–24 years prior to its 2008 assessment by the IUCN—which corresponds to three generations for the species—its numbers had dropped by at least 50%. Population data for the species is sparse, but a few studies have shown a low population density of 0.20 to 0.02 individuals per km^{2}.

Its numbers are still decreasing, primarily because of poaching. In Indonesia, it is sometimes used in traditional medicine, because of myths of it having magical and curative properties, but it is more frequently sold as an exotic pet. The species is easily captured because of its slow movement, nocturnal habits, and its tendency to sleep on exposed branches. They are both actively sought for the pet trade and collected opportunistically when felling forests. Its habitat is also in decline, although most of the habitat loss occurred by the mid-1980s. Within its range, human land use is intense. Environmental niche modelling indicates that the Javan slow loris is more threatened by habitat loss than other slow loris species. For these reasons, the Javan slow loris has been included on "The World's 25 Most Endangered Primates" published by the IUCN Species Survival Commission Primate Specialist Group (IUCN/SSC PSG), the International Primatological Society (IPS), and Conservation International (CI).

Along with all other slow lorises, the Javan slow loris was elevated from CITES Appendix II to CITES Appendix I in June 2007, offering it increased protection from commercial trade. It is also protected by Indonesian law, but according to loris researchers Nekaris and Jaffe, "effective law enforcement with respect to wildlife protection laws is all but non-existent in Indonesia". The species can be found in several protected areas, but its numbers are uncertain. Captive collections of the Javan slow loris can be found in Prague, Czech Republic, Jakarta, Indonesia, and Singapore.

On Java conservationist working for the Little Fireface Project have built a network of mid-air walkways to enable Javan slow loris to move between treetops in areas where land has been cleared for farming. These walkways also serve as irrigation pipes which have helped local farmers who in turn assist with the maintenance of the walkways.
