= Li Mae Long =

Mae Long Formation
- Stratigraphic range: Early Miocene (MN 4); ~18 Ma
- Type: Geological formation

Lithology
- Primary: Sandstone

Location
- Region: Lamphun Province
- Country: Thailand
- Extent: Li Basin

The Mae Long Formation in the Li Basin (also referred to as Li Mae Long) is a fossil site in Lamphun Province, Thailand. The fossils found are thought to date to the late Early Miocene, about 18 million years ago, corresponding to the European zone MN 4.

== Fossil content ==
Mammals found at the site include:

Metatherians

- Siamoperadectes minutus

Lipotyphlans

- Hylomys engesseri
- Neotetracus butleri
- Thaiagymnura equilateralis
- Unidentified Erinaceidae, possibly Mioechinus
- Scapanulus lampounensis

Bats

- Unidentified species possibly belonging to Taphozous
- Unidentified species of Megaderma
- Hipposideros felix
- H. khengkao
- Rhinolophus yongyuthsi
- Unidentified species of Rhinolophoidea
- Ia lanna
- Rhizomops mengraii
- Unidentified species of Vespertilionidae

Treeshrews

- Tupaia miocenica

Primates

- ?Nycticebus linglom
- Tarsius thailandica

Rodents

- Ratufa maelongensis
- Unidentified species possibly belonging to Atlantoxerus
- Democricetodon kaonou
- Diatomys liensis
- Neocometes orientalis
- Potwarmus thailandicus
- Prokanisamys benjavuni
- Spanocricetodon janvieri

Carnivorans

- Two unidentified species

Proboscideans

- Unidentified species

Perissodactyls

- Unidentified species

Artiodactyls

- Conohyus sindiensis
- Siamotragulus haripounchai
- Stephanocemas rucha
- Unidentified species possibly belonging to Homoiodorcas
