= Siamoperadectes =

Siamoperadectes Temporal range: 15–11 Ma Miocene

Scientific classification
- Kingdom: Animalia
- Phylum: Chordata
- Class: Mammalia
- Subclass: Theria
- Genus: †Siamoperadectes; Ducrocq et al., 1992

Type species
- Siamoperadectes minutus Ducrocq et al., 1992

Species
- Siamoperadectes minutus

Genus of non-marsupial metatherian from the Miocene of Thailand

Siamoperadectes is a genus of putative non-marsupial metatherian from the Miocene of Thailand. A member of Peradectidae, it is the first member of its clade known from South Asia, and among the last non-marsupial metatherians.

== Description ==
The type specimen of Siamoperadectes is a single third upper molar found in the Li Mae Long Basin, northern Thailand. It displays a rectilinear predilambdodont centrocrista, lacks an hypocone and has a moderately slender lingual part of the molar, all characteristics that most closely connect it to peradectid metatherians. However, it also displays several unique characteristics:

- a deep and narrow protofossa;

- very weak conules;

- an anteroposteriorly compressed protocone;

- a posterior cingulum at the base of the metacone.

The molar is quite small, and in life would probably have belonged to a creature about the size of a modern Monodelphis opossum. Though peradectids have been traditionally considered scansorial, the fact that the relatively closely related herpetotheriids were terrestrial may suggest a similar lifestyle, though the lack of postcranial remains for Siamoperadectes render this speculation.

== Relationships ==
Siamoperadectes has historically been considered to be a peradectid metatherian, and in particular closely related to Sinoperadectes and Junggaroperadectes. Though described as a didelphid in the original paper, the current general consensus is that peradectids are outside of crown-group Marsupialia, and their appearance in the Late Cretaceous greatly predates the estimated initial divergence within marsupials 45 million years ago. However, their placement as peradectids and even as metatherians has been questioned, with a 2026 study suggesting that they were eutherians instead.

== Ecology ==
Siamoperadectes is known from the Miocene Li Mae Long deposits, which are rich on a variety of other mammal species such as the eulipotyphlans Thaiagymnura equilateralis, Hylomys engesseri, Neotetracus butleri and Scapanulus lampounensis, several rodents such as Diatomys liensis, the treeshrew Tupaia miocenica and several bats, ungulates and carnivorans. So far as known, every other mammal in its environment was a placental eutherian.

== Biogeography ==
Siamoperadectes is the most southerly known peradectid. The close relations to Chinese peradectids like Sinoperadectes and Junggaroperadectes suggest that it had a Laurasian origin rather than having evolved in the Indian subcontinent, and alongside African and Indian herpetotheriids and true marsupials it represents one of several Cenozoic metatherian colonisations of southern landmasses.

== Temporal range ==
Alongside the Chinese Sinoperadectes, Siamoperadectes is one of the youngest Laurasian metatherians and certainly one of the last non-marsupial metatherians aside from the South American sparassodonts, dating to the mid-Miocene somewhere between 15 and 11 million years ago. Traditionally, competition with placental mammals has been deemed as a culprit for the ultimate extinction of metatherians outside of South America and Australia, but this has been placed into question, especially given in light of the coexistence of both clades through most of the Cretaceous and Cenozoic. At least herpetotheriids appear to have been reasonably common until the mid-Miocene, when they suddenly disappear; Asian peradectids followed soon after.

After the extinction of Siamoperadectes, Australian-derived bear cuscuses (Ailurops) colonised Indonesian islands.
