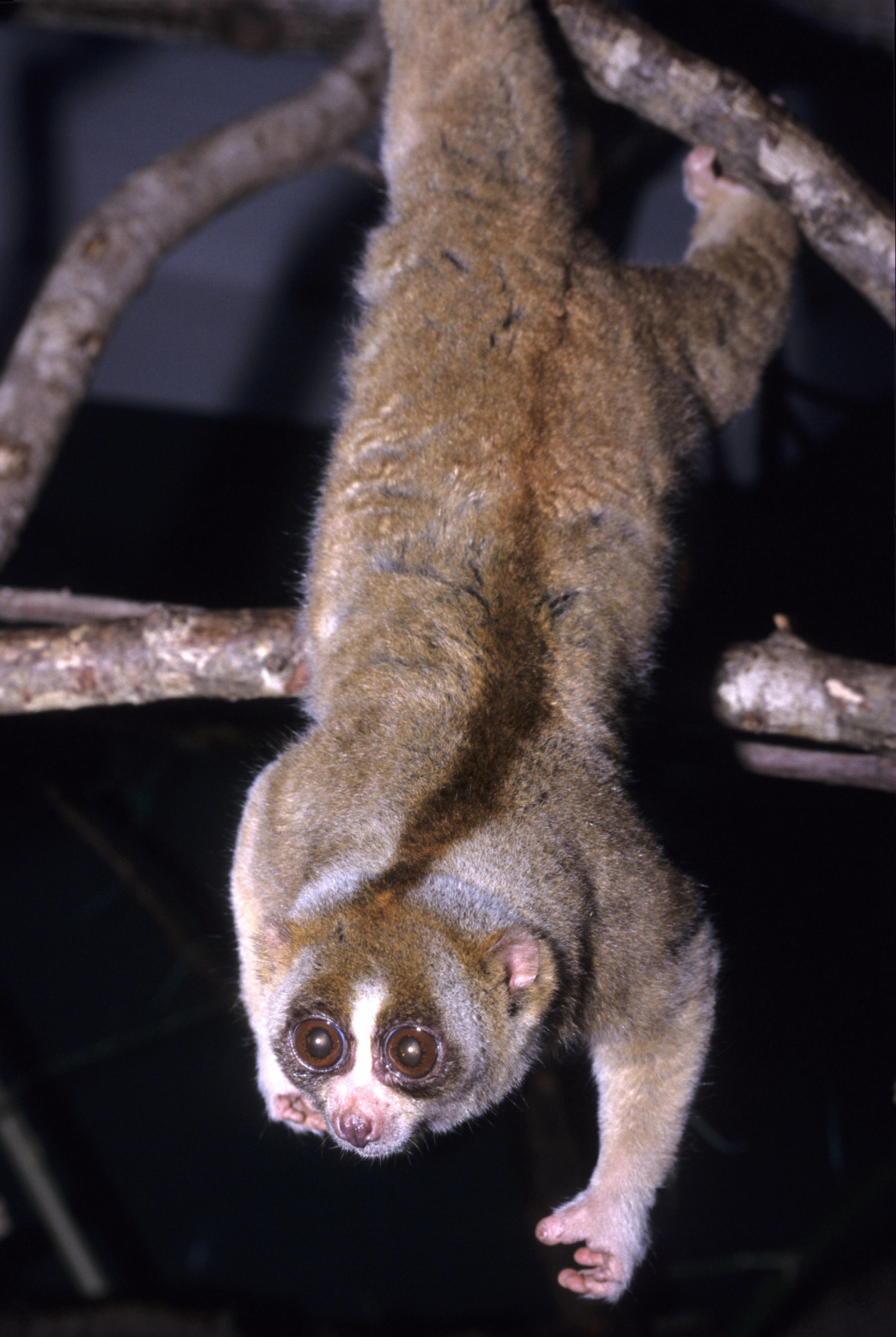
- Sunda slow loris Nycticebus coucang

Conservation status
- CITES Appendix I

Scientific classification
- Kingdom: Animalia
- Phylum: Chordata
- Class: Mammalia
- Order: Primates
- Suborder: Strepsirrhini
- Family: Lorisidae
- Subfamily: Lorinae
- Genus: Nycticebus; É. Geoffroy, 1812

Type species
- Tardigradus coucang Boddaert, 1785

Species
- N. bancanus Lyon, 1906; N. bengalensis (Lacépède, 1800); N. borneanus Lyon, 1906; N. coucang (Boddaert, 1785); N. hilleri Stone & Rehn, 1902; N. javanicus É. Geoffroy, 1812; N. kayan Munds, Nekaris & Ford, 2013; N. menagensis (Lydekker, 1893); †N. linglom Mein & Ginsburg, 1997
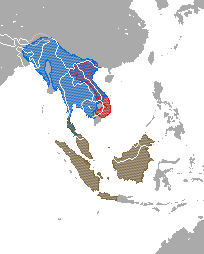
- Distribution of Nycticebus and Xanthonycticebus red = X. pygmaeus; blue = N. bengalensis; brown = N. bancanus, N. borneanus, N. coucang, N. javanicus, N. kayan & N. menagensis

Synonyms
- Tardigradus Boddaert 1784: (preoccupied); Loris É. Geoffroy 1796; Lori Lacépède 1799; Stenops Illiger 1811; Bradycebus É. Geoffroy and F. Cuvier 1820: (nomen nudum); Bradylemur de Blainville 1839

= Slow loris =

Slow lorises

Genus of primates from Southeast Asia

Slow lorises are a group of several species of nocturnal strepsirrhine primates that make up the genus Nycticebus. Found in Southeast Asia and nearby areas, they range from Bangladesh and Northeast India in the west to the Sulu Archipelago in the Philippines in the east, and from Yunnan province in China in the north to the island of Java in the south.

Although many previous classifications recognized as few as a single all-inclusive species, there are now at least eight that are considered valid: the Sunda slow loris (N. coucang), Bengal slow loris (N. bengalensis), Javan slow loris (N. javanicus), Philippine slow loris (N. menagensis), Bangka slow loris (N. bancanus), Bornean slow loris (N. borneanus), Kayan River slow loris (N. kayan) and Sumatran slow loris (N. hilleri). A ninth species, the pygmy slow loris (X. pygmaeus), was recently moved to the new genus Xanthonycticebus. After the pygmy slow loris, the group's closest relatives are the slender lorises of southern India and Sri Lanka. Their next closest relatives are the African lorisids, the pottos, false pottos, and angwantibos. They are less closely related to the remaining lorisoids (the various types of galago), and more distantly to the lemurs of Madagascar. Their evolutionary history is uncertain since their fossil record is patchy and molecular clock studies have given inconsistent results.

Slow lorises have a round head, a narrow snout, large eyes, and a variety of distinctive coloration patterns that are species-dependent. Their arms and legs are nearly equal in length, and their torso is long and flexible, allowing them to twist and extend to nearby branches. The hands and feet of slow lorises have several adaptations that give them a pincer-like grip and enable them to grasp branches for long periods of time. Slow lorises have a toxic bite, a trait rare among mammals and unique among the primates. The toxin is obtained by licking a sweat gland on their arm, and the secretion is activated by mixing with saliva. Their toxic bite, once thought to be primarily a deterrent to predators, has been discovered to be primarily used in disputes within the species.

The secretion from the arm contains a chemical related to cat allergen, but may be augmented by secondary toxins from the diet in wild individuals. Slow lorises move slowly and deliberately, making little or no noise, and when threatened, they stop moving and remain motionless. Their only documented predators—apart from humans—include snakes, changeable hawk-eagles and orangutans, although cats, viverrids and sun bears are suspected. Little is known about their social structure, but they are known to communicate by scent marking. Males are highly territorial. Slow lorises reproduce slowly, and the infants are initially parked on branches or carried by either parent. They are omnivores, eating small animals, fruit, tree gum, and other vegetation.

Each of the slow loris species that had been identified prior to 2012 is listed as either "Vulnerable" or "Endangered" on the IUCN Red List. The three newest species are yet to be evaluated, but they arise from (and further reduce the ranks of) what was thought to be a single "vulnerable" species. All four of these are expected to be listed with at least the same, if not a higher-risk, conservation status. All slow lorises are threatened by the wildlife trade and habitat loss. Their habitat is rapidly disappearing and becoming fragmented, making it nearly impossible for slow lorises to disperse between forest fragments; unsustainable demand from the exotic pet trade and from traditional medicine has been the greatest cause for their decline.

== Taxonomy and systematics ==
Although many previous classifications recognized as few as a single all-inclusive species, there are now at least eight that are considered valid:

Genus Nycticebus – É Geoffroy, 1812 – eight species
Common name	Scientific name and subspecies	Range	Size and ecology	IUCN status and estimated population
Bangka slow loris	N. bancanus (Lyon, 1906)	Borneo and Bangka Islands in southeastern Asia	Size: About 26 cm (10 in) long, with no tail Habitat: Forest Diet: Insects, gum, nectar, and fruit	CR Unknown
Bengal slow loris	N. bengalensis (Lacépède, 1800)	Southeastern Asia	Size: 26–38 cm (10–15 in) long, with vestigial tail Habitat: Forest Diet: Resin and gum, as well as nectar, fruit, invertebrates, bark, and bird eggs	EN Unknown
Bornean slow loris	N. borneanus (Lyon, 1906)	Borneo	Size: About 26 cm (10 in) long, with no tail Habitat: Forest Diet: Insects, gum, nectar, and fruit	VU Unknown
Javan slow loris	N. javanicus É Geoffroy, 1812	Java in southeastern Asia	Size: 28–31 cm (11–12 in) long, with vestigial tail Habitat: Forest Diet: Nectar, gum, insects, fruit, lizards, and eggs	CR Unknown
Kayan River slow loris	N. kayan Munds, Nekaris, Ford, 2013	Borneo	Size: About 27 cm (11 in) long, with no tail Habitat: Forest Diet: Unknown	VU Unknown
Philippine slow loris	N. menagensis Lydekker, 1893	Borneo and nearby islands	Size: About 27 cm (11 in) long, with no tail Habitat: Forest Diet: Insects, nectar, gum, and fruit	VU Unknown
Sumatran slow loris	N. hilleri (Stone and Rehn, 1902)	Sumatra in southeastern Asia	Size: 26–30 cm (10–12 in) long, with no tail Habitat: Forest Diet: Insects, nectar, gum, and fruit	EN Unknown
Sunda slow loris	N. coucang (Boddaert, 1785)	Southeastern Asia	Size: 27–38 cm (11–15 in) long, with no tail Habitat: Forest Diet: Sap, gum, nectar, stems, and fruit, as well as arthropods and insects	EN Unknown

Other than the pygmy slow loris in sister genus Xanthonycticebus, the group's closest relatives are the slender lorises of southern India and Sri Lanka. Their next closest relatives are the African lorisids, the pottos, false pottos, and angwantibos. They are less closely related to the remaining lorisoids (the various types of galago), and more distantly to the lemurs of Madagascar. Their evolutionary history is uncertain since their fossil record is patchy and molecular clock studies have given inconsistent results.

=== Evolutionary history ===
Closest living relatives of slow lorises

- Lemuriformes
  - Lorisoidea
    - Lorisidae
      - Perodicticinae
        - Angwantibos (Arctocebus)
        - Pottos (Perodicticus)
      - Lorisinae
        - Slender lorises (Loris)
        - - Slow lorises (Nycticebus)
          - Pygmy slow loris (Xanthonycticebus)
    - Galagos (Galagidae)
  - Lemurs (Lemuroidea)

Slow lorises (genus Nycticebus) are strepsirrhine primates and are related to other living lorisoids, such as the pygmy slow loris (Xanthonycticebus), slender lorises (Loris), pottos (Perodicticus), false pottos (Pseudopotto), angwantibos (Arctocebus), and galagos (family Galagidae), and to the lemurs of Madagascar. They are most closely related to the pygmy slow loris, followed by the slender lorises of South Asia, the angwantibos, pottos and false pottos of Central and West Africa. Lorisoids are thought to have evolved in Africa, where most living species occur; later, one group may have migrated to Asia and evolved into the slender and slow lorises of today.

Lorises first appear in the Asian fossil record in the Miocene, with records in Thailand around 18 million years ago (mya) and in Pakistan 16 mya. The Thai record is based on a single tooth that most closely resembles living slow lorises and that is tentatively classified as a species of Nycticebus. The species is named ? Nycticebus linglom, using open nomenclature (the preceding "?" indicates the tentative nature of the assignment).

Several lorises are found in the Siwalik deposits of Pakistan, including Nycticeboides and Microloris; they date from 16 to 8 mya Most are small, but an unnamed form dating to 15–16 mya is comparable in size to the largest living slow lorises. Molecular clock analysis suggests that slow lorises may have started evolving into distinct species about 10 mya. They are thought to have reached the islands of Sundaland when the Sunda Shelf was exposed at times of low sea level, creating a land bridge between the mainland and islands off the coast of Southeast Asia.

==== Discovery and taxonomy ====
... it had the face of a bear, the hands of a monkey and moved like a sloth ...

— American zoologist Dean Conant Worcester, describing the Bornean slow loris in 1891.

The earliest known mention of a slow loris in scientific literature is from 1770, when Dutchman Arnout Vosmaer (1720–1799) described a specimen of what we know today as N. bengalensis that he had received two years earlier. The French naturalist Georges-Louis Leclerc, Comte de Buffon, later questioned Vosmaer's decision to affiliate the animal with sloths, arguing that it was more closely aligned with the lorises of Ceylon (now Sri Lanka) and Bengal. The word "loris" was first used in 1765 by Buffon as a close equivalent to a Dutch name, loeris. This etymology was later supported by the physician William Baird in the 1820s, who noted that the Dutch word loeris signified "a clown".

In 1785, the Dutch physician and naturalist Pieter Boddaert was the first to officially describe a species of slow loris using the name Tardigradus coucang. This species was based on the "tailless maucauco" described by Thomas Pennant in 1781, which is thought to have been based on a Sunda slow loris, and on Vosmaer's description of a Bengal slow loris. Consequently, there has been some disagreement over the identity of Tardigradus coucang; currently the name is given to the Sunda slow loris. The next slow loris species to be described was Lori bengalensis (currently Nycticebus bengalensis), named by Bernard Germain de Lacépède in 1800.

In 1812, Étienne Geoffroy Saint-Hilaire named the genus Nycticebus, naming it for its nocturnal behavior. The name derives from the Ancient Greek: νυκτός, romanized: (nyktos), genitive form of νύξ (nyx, "night"), and κῆβος (kêbos, "monkey"). Geoffroy also named Nycticebus javanicus in this work. Later 19th-century authors also called the slow lorises Nycticebus, but most used the species name tardigradus (given by Linnaeus in 1758 in the 10th edition of Systema Naturæ) for slow lorises, until mammalogists Witmer Stone and James A. G. Rehn clarified in 1902 that Linnaeus's name actually referred to a slender loris.

Several more species were named around 1900, including Nycticebus menagensis (originally Lemur menagensis) by Richard Lydekker in 1893 and Nycticebus pygmaeus by John James Lewis Bonhote in 1907. However, in 1939 Reginald Innes Pocock consolidated all slow lorises into a single species, N. coucang, and in his influential 1953 book Primates: Comparative Anatomy and Taxonomy, primatologist William Charles Osman Hill also followed this course. In 1971 Colin Groves recognized the pygmy slow loris (N. pygmaeus) as a separate species, and divided N. coucang into four subspecies, while in 2001 Groves opined there were three species (N. coucang, N. pygmaeus, and N. bengalensis), and that N. coucang had three subspecies (Nycticebus coucang coucang, N. c. menagensis, and N. c. javanicus).

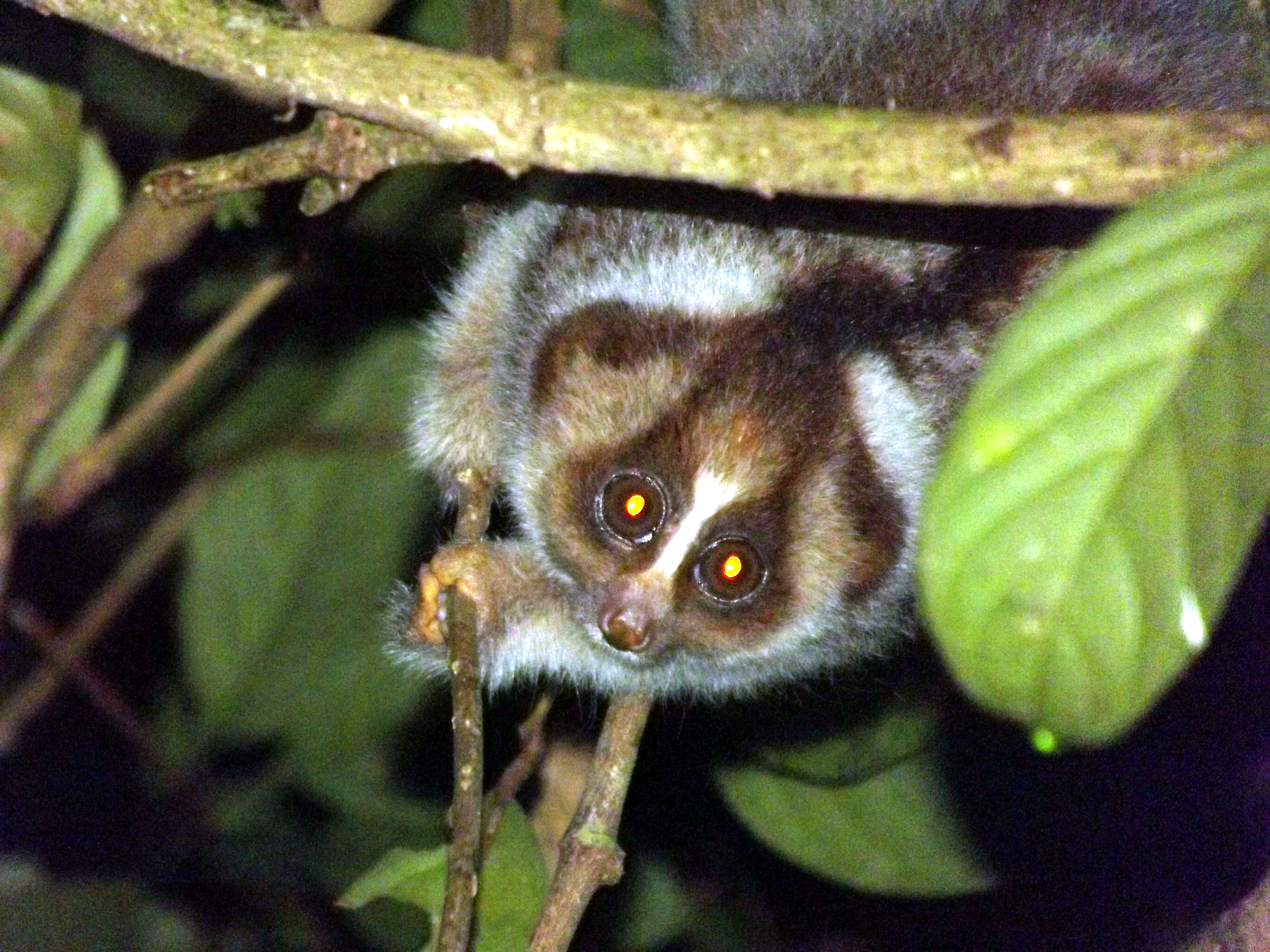
The Kayan River slow loris (N. kayan) was distinguished from N. menagensis in 2012.

In 2006, the Bornean slow loris was elevated to the species level (as Nycticebus menagensis) based on molecular analysis of DNA sequences of the D-loop and the cytochrome b gene. In 2008, Groves and Ibnu Maryanto confirmed the promotion of the fifth species, the Javan slow loris, to species status, a move that had been suggested in previous studies from 2000. They based their decision on an analysis of cranial morphology and characteristics of pelage. Species differentiation was based largely on differences in morphology, such as size, fur color, and head markings.

To help clarify species and subspecies boundaries, and to establish whether morphology-based classifications were consistent with evolutionary relationships, the phylogenetic relationships within the genus Nycticebus were investigated by Chen and colleagues using DNA sequences derived from the mitochondrial markers D-loop and cytochrome b. Previous molecular analyses using karyotypes, restriction enzymes, and DNA sequences were focused on understanding the relationships between a few species, not the phylogeny of the entire genus. The analyses published in 2006 by Chen and colleagues' proved inconclusive, although one test suggested that N. coucang and N. bengalensis apparently share a closer evolutionary relationship with each other than with members of their own species, possibly due to introgressive hybridization since the tested individuals of these two taxa originated from a region of sympatry in southern Thailand. This hypothesis was corroborated by a 2007 study that compared the variations in mitochondrial DNA sequences between N. bengalensis and N. coucang, and suggested that there has been gene flow between the two species.

In 2012, two taxonomic synonyms (formerly recognized as subspecies) of N. menagensis—N. bancanus and N. borneanus—were elevated to species status, and a new species—N. kayan—was also distinguished from the same. Rachel Munds, Anna Nekaris and Susan Ford based these taxonomic revisions on distinguishable facial markings. With that, the N. menagensis species complex that had been collectively known as the Bornean slow loris became four species: the Philippine slow loris (N. menagensis), the Bornean slow loris (N. borneanus), the Bangka slow loris (N. bancanus), and the Kayan River slow loris (N. kayan).

Nekaris and Nijman (2022) combined morphological, behavioural, karyotypical and genetic data and suggested that the pygmy slow loris is best placed in its own genus, Xanthonycticebus.

== Anatomy and physiology ==
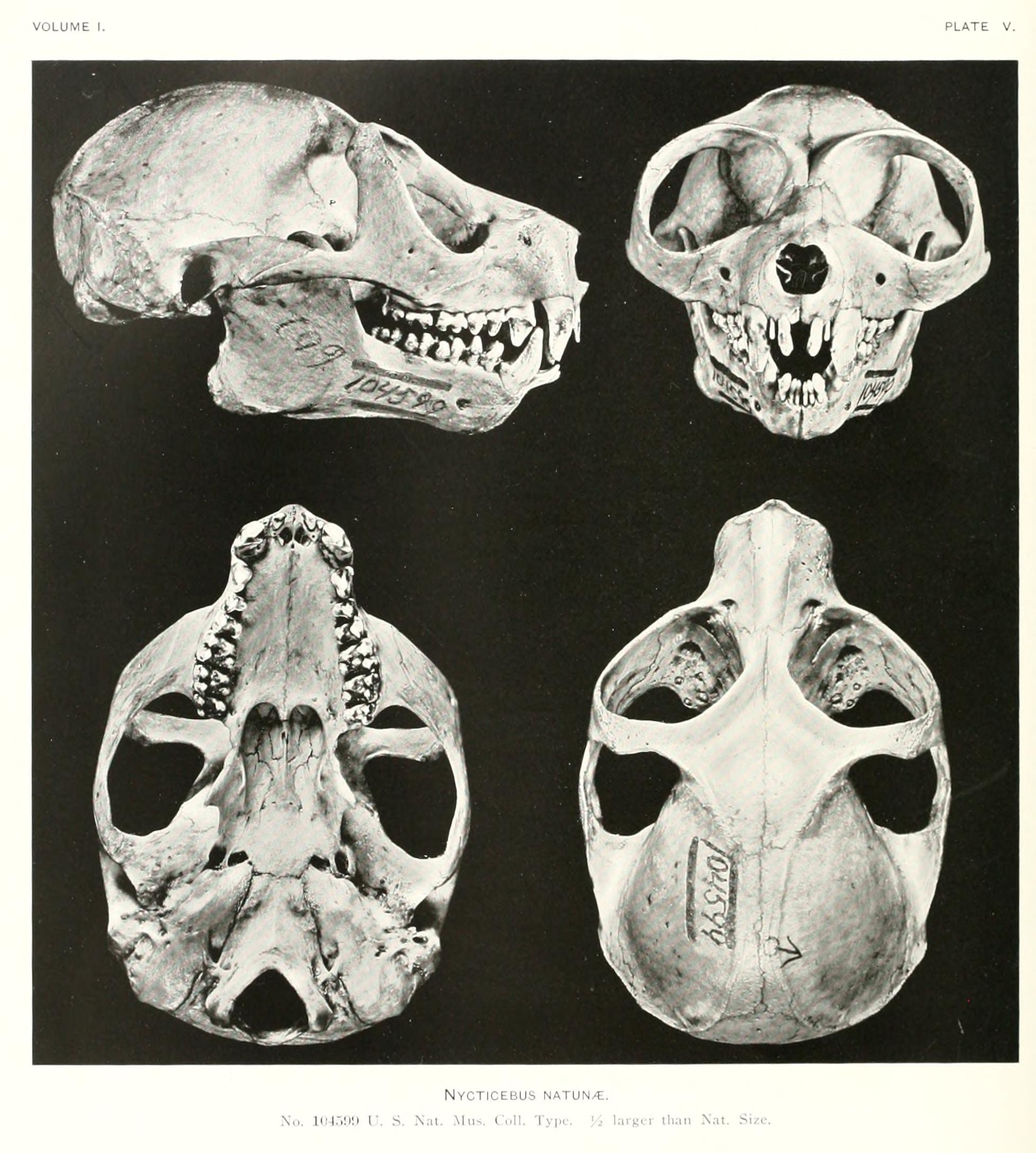
The skull of the Sunda slow loris

Slow lorises have a round head because their skull is shorter than in other living strepsirrhine. Like other lorisids, their snout does not taper towards the front of the face as it does in lemurs, making the face appear less long and pointed. Compared with the slender lorises, the snout of the slow loris is even less pointed. As with other members of Lorisidae, its interorbital distance is shorter than in lemurs. The skull has prominent crests (ridges of bone). A distinguishing feature of the slow loris skull is that the occipital bone is flattened and faces backward. The foramen magnum (hole through which the spinal cord enters) faces directly backward. The brains of slow lorises have more folds (convolutions) than the brains of galagos.

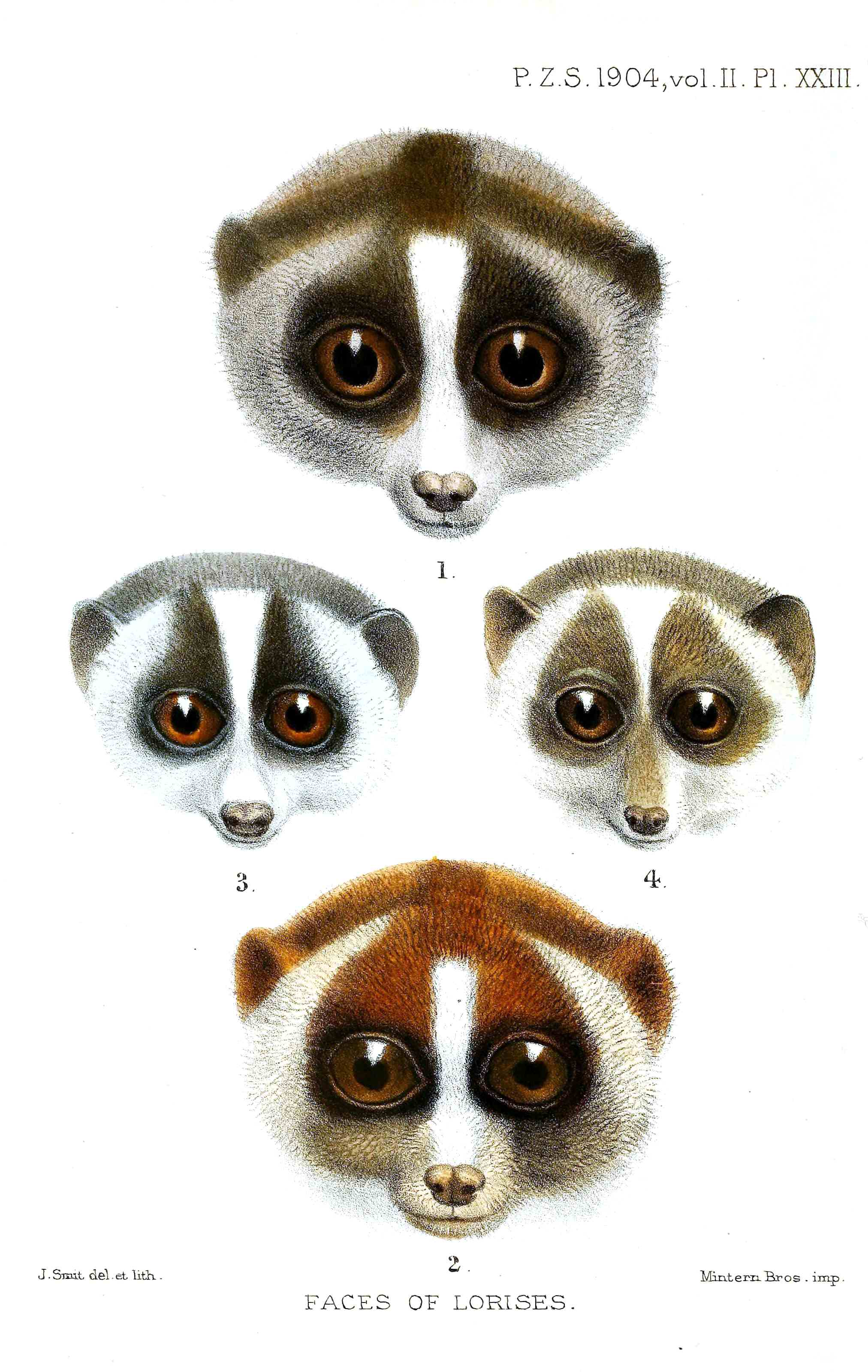
Coloration patterns around the eyes differ between the slender lorises (middle two) and the slow lorises (top and bottom).

The ears are small, sparsely covered in hair, and hidden in the fur. Similar to the slender lorises, the fur around and directly above the eyes is dark. Unlike the slender lorises, however, the white stripe that separates the eye rings broadens both on the tip of the nose and on the forehead while also fading out on the forehead. Like other strepsirrhine primates, the nose and lip are covered by a moist skin called the rhinarium ("wet nose"), which is a sense organ.

The eyes of slow lorises are forward-facing, which gives stereo vision. Their eyes are large and possess a reflective layer, called the tapetum lucidum, that improves low-light vision. It is possible that this layer blurs the images they see, as the reflected light may interfere with the incoming light. Slow lorises have monochromatic vision, meaning they see in shades of only one color. They lack the opsin gene that would allow them to detect short wavelength light, which includes the colors blue and green.

The dental formula of slow lorises is 2.1.3.32.1.3.3 × 2 = 36, meaning that on each side of the mouth there are two upper (maxillary) and lower (mandibular) incisors, one upper and lower canine tooth, three upper and lower premolars, and three upper and lower molars, giving a total of 36 permanent teeth. As in all other crown strepsirrhines, their lower incisors and canine are procumbent (lie down and face outwards), forming a toothcomb, which is used for personal and social grooming and feeding. The toothcomb is kept clean by the sublingua or "under-tongue", a specialized structure that acts like a toothbrush to remove hair and other debris. The sublingua extends below the tip of the tongue and is tipped with keratinized, serrated points that rake between the front teeth.

Slow lorises have relatively large maxillary canine teeth, their inner (mesial) maxillary incisors are larger than the outer (distal) maxillary incisors, and they have a diastema (gap) between the canine and the first premolar. The first mandibular premolar is elongated, and the last molar has three cusps on the crown, the shortest of which is near the back. The bony palate (roof of the mouth) only goes as far back as the second molar.

Slow lorises range in weight from the Bornean slow loris at 265 grams (9.3 oz) to as much as 2,100 grams (74 oz) for the Bengal slow loris. Slow lorises have stout bodies, and their tails are only stubs and hidden beneath the dense fur. Their combined head and body lengths vary by species, but range from 18 to 38 cm (7.1 to 15.0 in) between all species. The trunk is longer than in other living strepsirrhines because they have 15–16 thoracic vertebrae, compared to 12–14 in other living strepsirrhines. This gives them greater mobility when twisting and extending towards nearby branches. Their other vertebrae include seven cervical vertebrae, six or seven lumbar vertebrae, six or seven sacral vertebrae, and seven to eleven caudal vertebrae.

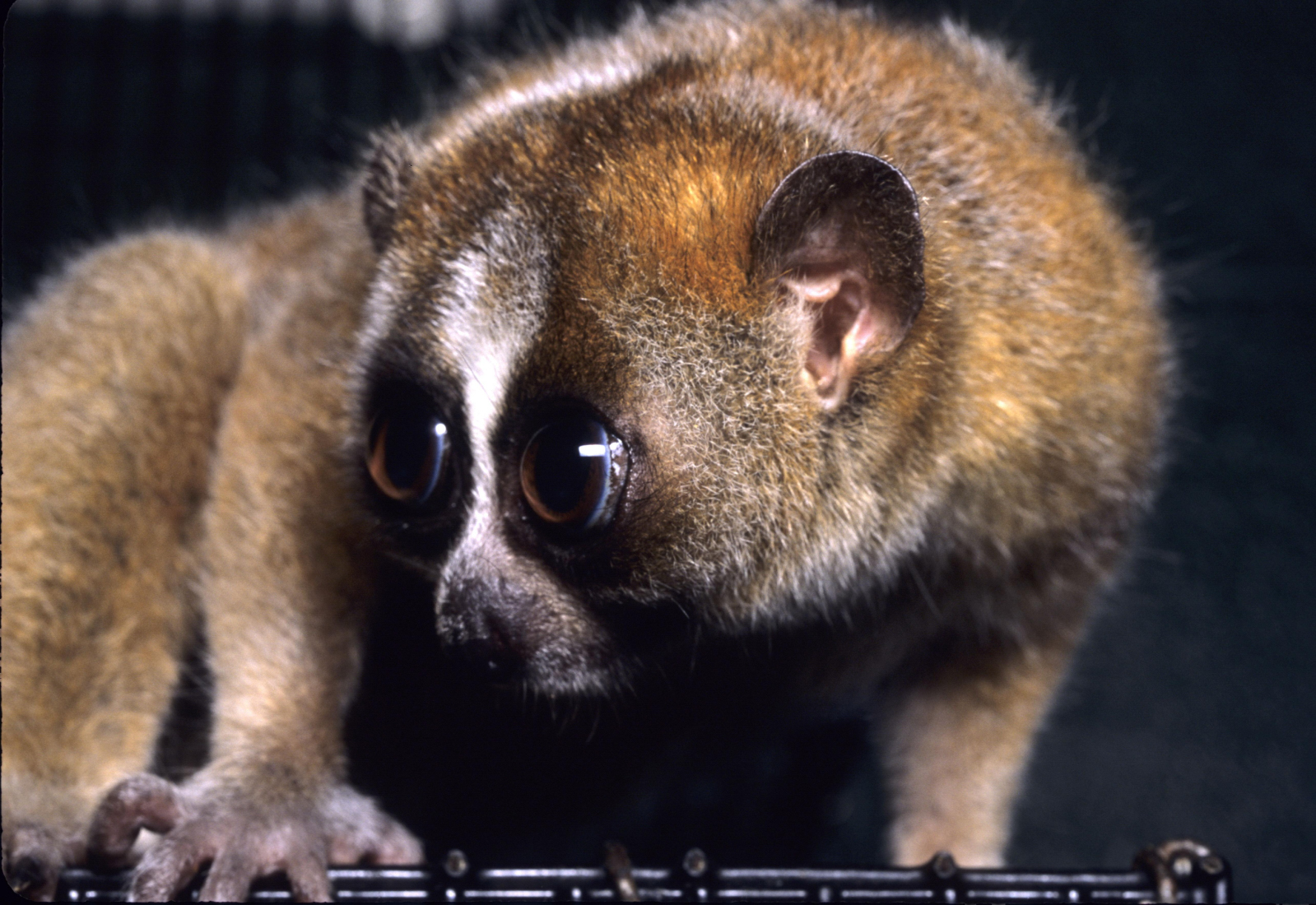
The eyes of slow lorises are large and have a reflective layer, called the tapetum lucidum, to help them see better at night.

Unlike galagos, which have longer legs than arms, slow lorises have arms and legs of nearly equal length. Their intermembral index (ratio of arm to leg length) averages 89, indicating that their forelimbs are slightly shorter than their hind limbs. As with the slender lorises, their arms are slightly longer than their body, but the extremities of slow lorises are more stout.

Slow lorises have a powerful grasp with both their hands and feet due to several specializations. They can tightly grasp branches with little effort because of a special muscular arrangement in their hands and feet, where the thumb diverges at nearly 180° from the rest of the fingers, while the hallux (big toe) ranges between being perpendicular and pointing slightly backwards. The toes have a large flexor muscle that originates on the lower end of the thigh bone, which helps to impart a strong grasping ability to the hind limbs.

The second digit of the hand is short compared to the other digits, while on the foot, the fourth toe is the longest. The sturdy thumb helps to act like a clamp when digits three, four, and five grasp the opposite side of a tree branch. This gives their hands and feet a pincer-like appearance. The strong grip can be held for hours without losing sensation due to the presence of a rete mirabile (network of capillaries), a trait shared among all lorises. Both slender and slow lorises have relatively short feet. Like nearly all lemuriforms, they have a grooming claw on the second toe of each foot.

Slow lorises have an unusually low basal metabolic rate, about 40% of the typical value for placental mammals of their size, comparable to that of sloths. Since they consume a relatively high-calorie diet that is available year-round, it has been proposed that this slow metabolism is due primarily to the need to eliminate toxic compounds from their food. For example, slow lorises can feed on Gluta bark, which may be fatal to humans.

== Distribution and diversity ==
Slow lorises are found in South and Southeast Asia. Their collective range stretches from Northeast India through Indochina, east to the Sulu Archipelago (the small, southern islands of the Philippines), and south to the island of Java (including Borneo, Sumatra, and many small nearby islands). They are found in India (Northeastern states), China (Yunnan province), Laos, Vietnam, Cambodia, Bangladesh, Burma, Thailand, Malaysia, the Philippines, Indonesia, Brunei, and Singapore.

There are currently seven recognized species. The Bornean slow loris (N. menagensis), found on Borneo and nearby islands, including the Sulu Archipelago, and in 2012 was split into four distinct species (adding N. bancanus, N. borneanus, and N. kayan). The Javan slow loris (N. javanicus) is only found on the island of Java in Indonesia. The Sunda slow loris (N. coucang) occurs on Sumatra and the Malay Peninsula, including Singapore and southern Thailand (the Isthmus of Kra). The Bengal slow loris (N. bengalensis) has the largest distribution of all the slow lorises and can be found in Bangladesh, Cambodia, southern China, Northeast India, Laos, Burma, Thailand, and Vietnam.

Slow lorises range across tropical and subtropical regions and are found in primary and secondary rainforests, as well as bamboo groves and mangrove forests. They prefer forests with high, dense canopies, although some species have also been found in disturbed habitats, such as cacao plantations and mixed-crop home gardens. Due largely to their nocturnal behavior and the subsequent difficulties in accurately quantifying abundance, data about the population size or distribution patterns of slow lorises is limited. In general, encounter rates are low; a combined analysis of several field studies involving transect surveys conducted in South and Southeast Asia determined encounter rates ranging from as high as 0.74 lorises per kilometer for N. coucang to as low as 0.1 lorises per kilometer for N. bengalensis.

== Behavior and ecology ==
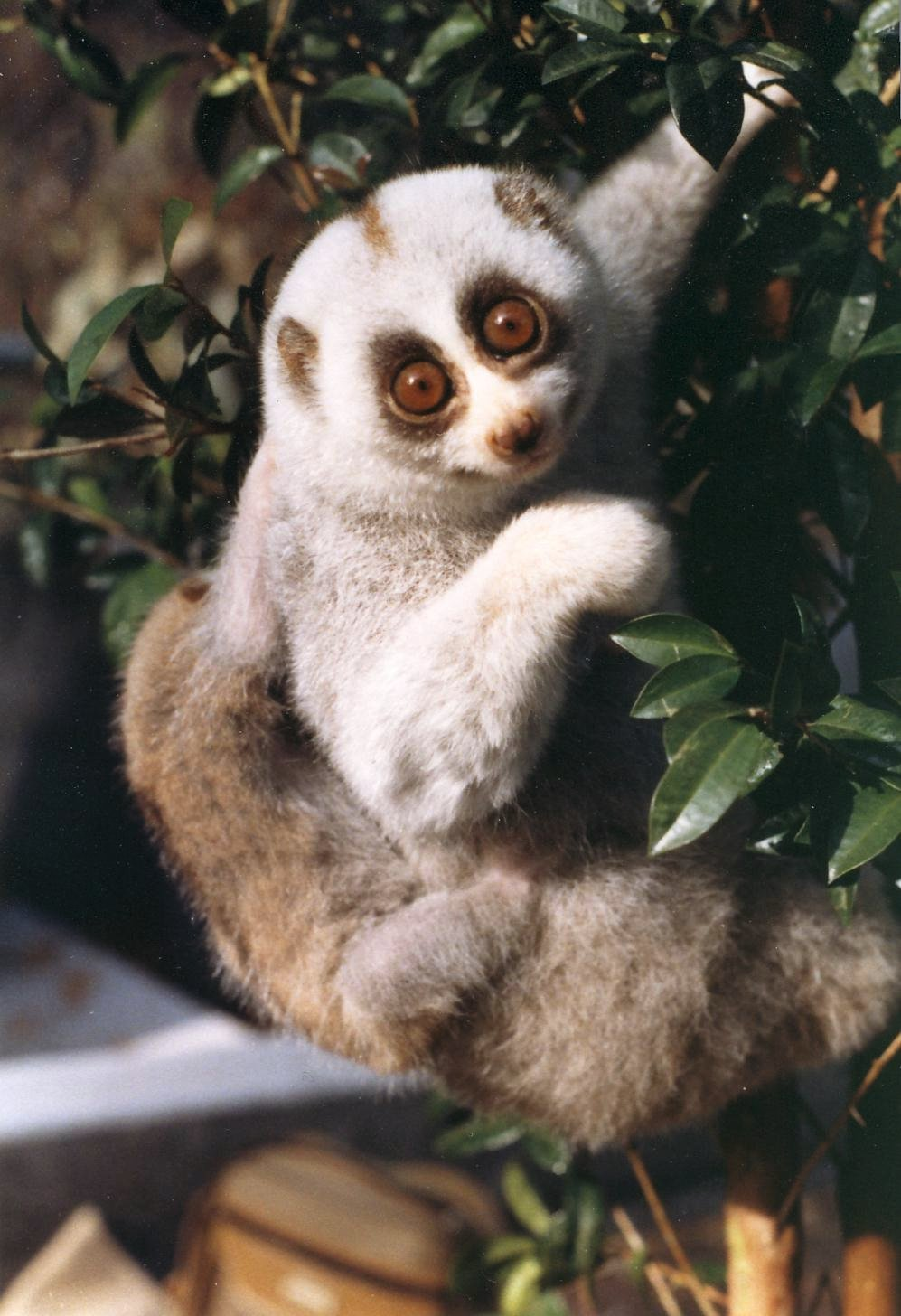
Infants are either parked on branches or carried by one of their parents while they forage.

Little is known about the social structure of slow lorises, but they generally spend most of the night foraging alone. Individuals sleep during the day, usually alone but occasionally with other slow lorises. Home ranges of adults may significantly overlap, and those of males are generally larger than those of females. In the absence of direct studies of the genus, primatologist Simon Bearder speculated that slow loris social behavior is similar to that of the potto, another nocturnal primate.

Such a social system is distinguished by a lack of matriarchy and by factors that allow the slow loris to remain inconspicuous and minimize energy expenditure. Vocal exchanges and alarm calls are limited; scent marking with urine is the dominant form of communication. Adult males are highly territorial and are aggressive towards other males. Vocalizations include an affiliative (friendly) call krik, and a louder call resembling a crow's caw. When disturbed, slow lorises can also produce a low buzzing hiss or growl. To make contact with other individuals, they emit a single high-pitched rising tone, and females use a high whistle when in estrus.

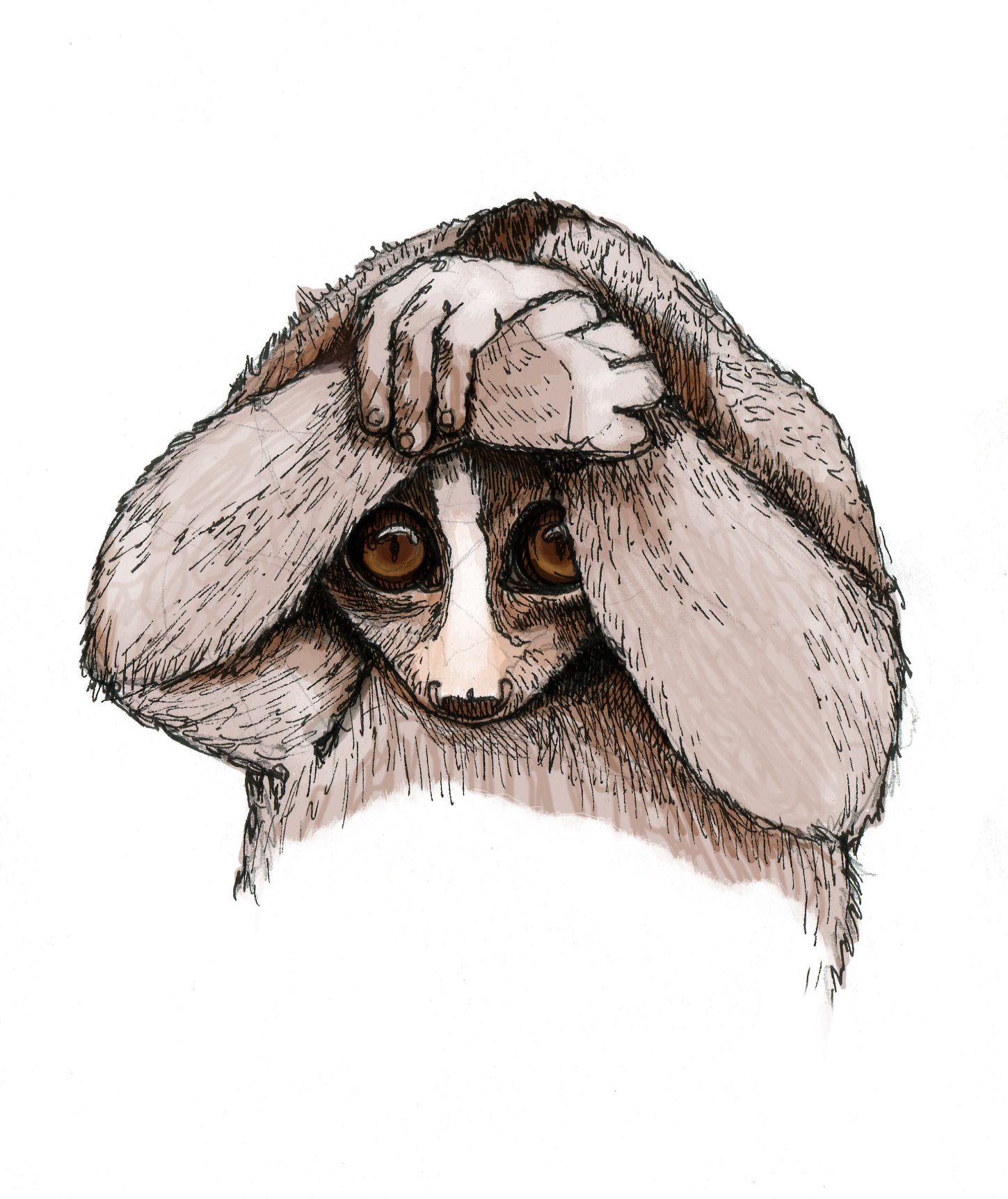
In Indonesia, slow lorises are called malu malu or "shy one" because they freeze and cover their face when spotted.

Slow lorises are slow and deliberate climbers, and often hold on to branches with three of their four limbs. To move between trees, they carefully grip the terminal branches of the neighboring tree and pull themselves across the small gap. They will also grip branches with only their hind feet, lift themselves upright, and quickly launch forward with their hands to catch prey.

Due to their slow movement, all lorises, including the slow lorises, have a specially adapted mechanism for defense against predation. Their slow, deliberate movement hardly disturbs the vegetation and is almost completely silent. Once disturbed, they immediately stop moving and remain motionless. In Indonesia, slow lorises are called malu malu or "shy one" because they freeze and cover their face when spotted.

If cornered, they may adopt a defensive posture by curling up and lunging at the predator. The Acehnese name, buah angin ("wind monkey"), refers to their ability to "fleetingly but silently escape". Little is known about the predation of slow lorises. Documented predators include snakes, the changeable hawk-eagle (Nisaetus cirrhatus), and Sumatran orangutans (Pongo abelii). Other potential predators include cats, sun bears (Helarctos malayanus), binturongs (Arctictis binturong), and Asian palm civets.

Slow lorises produce a secretion from their brachial gland (a scent gland on the upper arm near the axilla) that is licked and mixed with their saliva. In tests, three predators—binturongs, clouded leopards (Neofelis nebulosa), and sun bears—retreated or showed other signs of displeasure when presented with cotton swabs anointed with a mixture of the toxic secretion and the saliva, whereas the toxic secretion alone generated mild interest. Before stashing their offspring in a secure location, female slow lorises will lick their brachial glands, and then groom their young with their toothcomb, depositing the toxin on their fur. When threatened, slow lorises may also lick their brachial glands and bite their aggressors, delivering the toxin into the wounds. Slow lorises can be reluctant to release their bite, which is likely to maximize the transfer of toxins. This toxic bite is a rare trait among mammals and unique to lorisid primates. It may also be used for defense against other slow lorises and parasites. According to Nekaris, this adaptation—along with vocalizations, movement, and coloration patterns similar to those of true cobras—may have evolved through Müllerian mimicry to protect slow lorises when they need to move across the ground due to breaks in the canopy.

The secretion from the brachial gland of captive slow lorises is similar to the allergen in cat dander, hence the secretions may merely elicit an allergic reaction, not toxicosis. Loris bites cause a painful swelling, and the single case of human death reported in the scientific literature was believed to have resulted from anaphylactic shock.

To protect itself, the Slow loris has also been observed to rub the venom on its fur to chemically defend itself from predators.

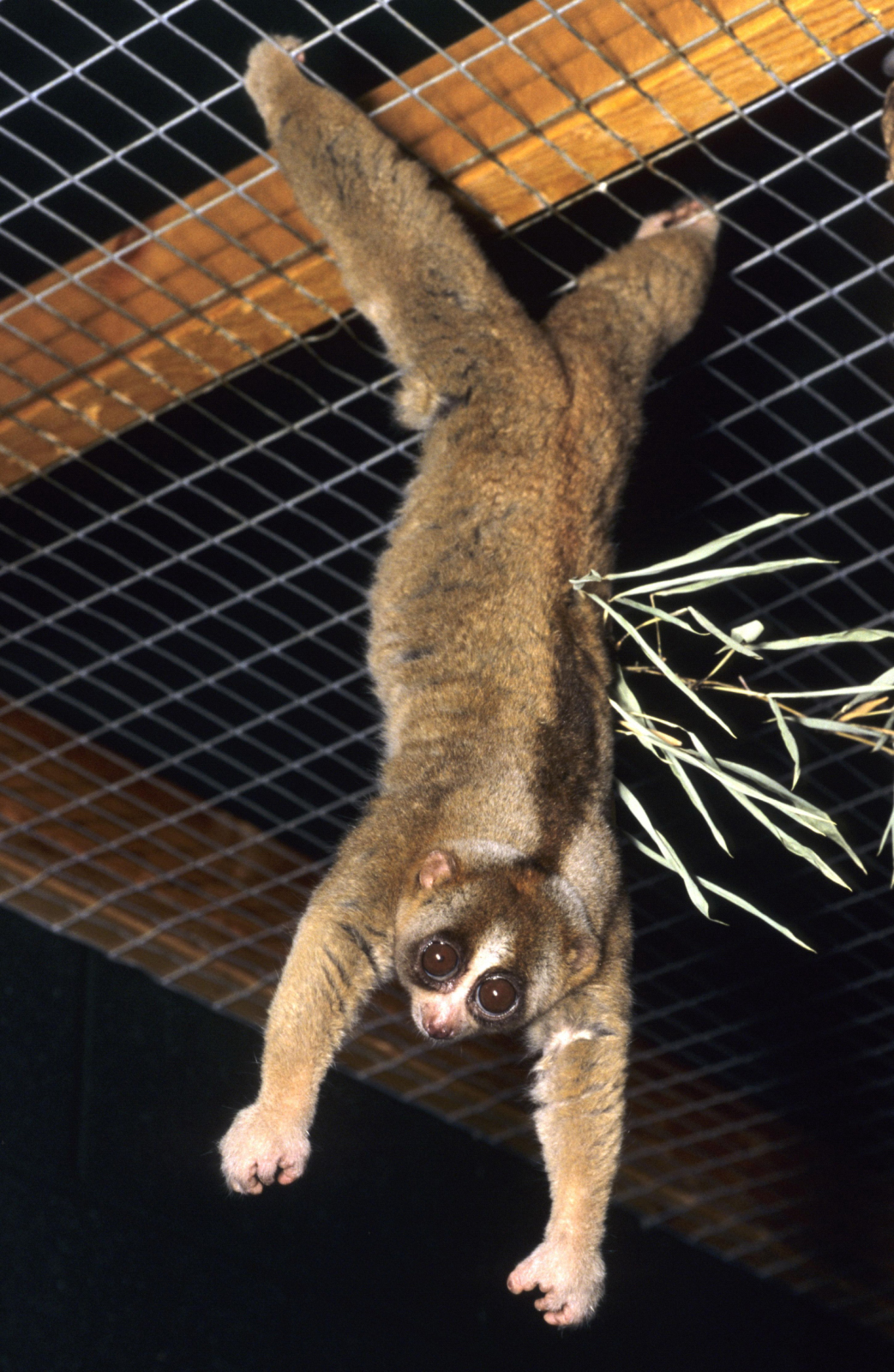
Slow lorises have a special network of capillaries in their hands and feet that allow them to cling to branches for hours without losing sensation.

Studies suggest that slow lorises are polygynandrous. Infants are either parked on branches while their parents find food or else are carried by one of the parents. Due to their long gestations (about six months), small litter sizes, low birth weights, long weaning times (three to six months), and long gaps between births, slow loris populations have one of the slowest growth rates among mammals of similar size. Pygmy slow lorises are likely to give birth to twins—from 50% to 100% of births, depending on the study; in contrast, this phenomenon is rare (3% occurrence) in Bengal slow lorises. A seven-year study of captive-bred pygmy slow lorises showed a skewed sex distribution, with 1.68 males born for every 1 female.

Breeding may be continuous throughout the year. Copulation often occurs while suspended with the hands and feet clinging to horizontal branches for support. In captive Sunda slow lorises, mating primarily occurs between June and mid-September, with the estrus cycle lasting 29 to 45 days and estrus lasting one to five days. Likewise, gestation lasts 185 to 197 days, and the young weigh between 30 and 60 grams (1.1 and 2.1 oz) at birth. Females reach sexual maturity at 18 to 24 months, while males are capable of reproducing at 17 months. However, the fathers become hostile towards their male offspring after 12 to 14 months and will chase them away. In captivity, they can live 20 or more years.

=== Diet ===
Slow lorises are omnivores, eating insects and other arthropods, small birds and reptiles, eggs, fruits, gums, nectar and miscellaneous vegetation. They conduct most of their foraging for food in the middle to upper canopy. A 1984 study of the Sunda slow loris indicated that its diet consists of 71% fruit and gums, and 29% insects and other animal prey. A more detailed study of another Sunda slow loris population in 2002 and 2003 showed different dietary proportions, consisting of 43.3% gum, 31.7% nectar, 22.5% fruit, and just 2.5% arthropods and other animal prey. The most common dietary item was nectar from flowers of the Bertram palm (Eugeissona tristis). The Sunda slow loris eats insects that other predators avoid due to their repugnant taste or smell.

Preliminary results of studies on the pygmy slow loris indicate that its diet consists primarily of gums and nectar (especially nectar from Saraca dives flowers), and that animal prey makes up 30–40% of its diet. However, one 2002 analysis of pygmy slow loris feces indicated that it contained 98% insect remains and just 2% plant remains. The pygmy slow loris often returns to the same gum feeding sites and leaves conspicuous gouges on tree trunks when inducing the flow of exudates. Slow lorises have been reported gouging for exudates at heights ranging from 1 m (3 ft 3 in) to as much as 12 m (39 ft); the gouging process, whereby the loris repetitively bangs its toothcomb into the hard bark, may be loud enough to be heard up to 10 m (33 ft) away. The marks remaining after gouging can be used by field workers to assess loris presence in an area.

Captive pygmy slow lorises also make characteristic gouge marks in wooden substrates, such as branches. It is not known how the sympatric pygmy and Bengal slow lorises partition their feeding niches. The plant gums, obtained typically from species in the family Fabaceae (peas), are high in carbohydrates and lipids, and can serve as a year-around source of food, or an emergency reserve when other preferred food items are scarce. Several anatomical adaptations present in slow lorises may enhance their ability to feed on exudates: a long narrow tongue to make it easier to reach gum stashed in cracks and crevices, a large cecum to help the animal digest complex carbohydrates, and a short duodenum to help quickly pass potentially toxic exudates. Slow lorises can use both hands to eat while hanging upside down from a branch. They spend about 20% of their nightly activities feeding.

== In culture ==
Beliefs about slow lorises and their use in traditional practices are deep-rooted and go back at least 300 years, if not earlier based on oral traditions. In the late 19th and early 20th centuries, it was reported that the people from the interior of Borneo believed that slow lorises were the gatekeepers for the heavens and that each person had a personal slow loris waiting for them in the afterlife. More often, however, slow lorises are used in traditional medicine or to ward off evil. The following passage from an early textbook about primates is indicative of the superstitions associated with slow lorises:

Many strange powers are attributed to this animal by the natives of the countries it inhabits; there is hardly an event in life to man, woman or child, or even domestic animals, that may not be influenced for better or worse by the Slow Loris, alive or dead, or by any separate part of it, and apparently one cannot usually tell at the time, that one is under supernatural power. Thus a Malay may commit a crime he did not premeditate, and then find that an enemy had buried a particular part of a Loris under his threshold, which had, unknown to him, compelled him to act to his own disadvantage. ... [a slow loris's] life is not a happy one, for it is continually seeing ghosts; that is why it hides its face in its hands.

In the Mondulkiri Province of Cambodia, hunters believe that lorises can heal their own broken bones immediately after falling from a branch so that they can climb back up the tree. They also believe that slow lorises have medicinal powers because they require more than one hit with a stick to die. In the province of North Sumatra, the slow loris is thought to bring good luck if it is buried under a house or a road. In the same province, slow loris body parts were used to place curses on enemies. In Java, it was thought that putting a piece of its skull in a water jug would make a husband more docile and submissive, just like a slow loris in the daytime. More recently, researchers have documented the belief that the consumption of loris meat was an aphrodisiac that improves "male power". The gall bladder of the Bengal slow loris has historically been used to make ink for tattoos by the village elders in Pursat and Koh Kong Provinces of Cambodia. Loris wine is a traditional Cambodian medicine supposed to alleviate the pain of childbirth, made from a mixture of loris bodies and rice wine.

== Conservation ==
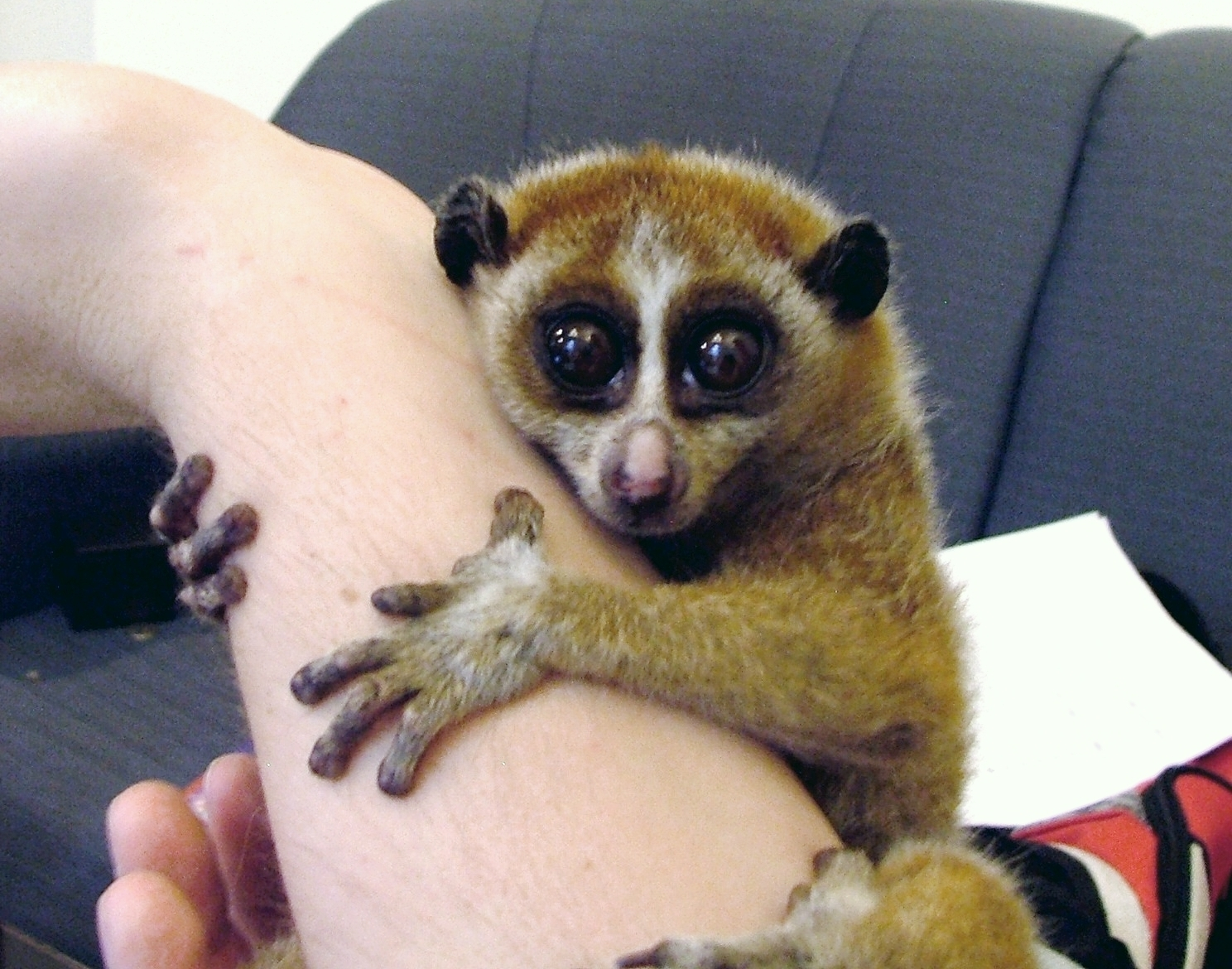
Slow lorises are popular in the exotic pet trade, which threatens wild populations.

The two greatest threats to slow lorises are deforestation and the wildlife trade. Slow lorises have lost a significant amount of habitat, with habitat fragmentation isolating small populations and obstructing biological dispersal. However, despite the lost habitat, their decline is most closely associated with unsustainable trade, either as exotic pets or for traditional medicine.

Each of the slow loris species that had been identified prior to 2012 are currently listed as either "Vulnerable" or "Endangered" by the International Union for Conservation of Nature (IUCN) on their Red List. When they were all considered a single species, imprecise population data together with their regular occurrence in Southeast Asian animal markets combined to incorrectly suggest that slow lorises were common. This manifested as incorrect Red List assessments of "Least Concern" as recently as 2000. The three newest species are yet to be evaluated by the IUCN, although each was once thought to be subpopulations of the Bornean slow loris—which was evaluated as "Vulnerable" in 2008. With this division of its range and population, the Bornean slow loris and the three new species face a higher risk of extinction than before.

Since 2007, all slow loris species have been protected from commercial international trade under Appendix I of CITES. Furthermore, local trade is illegal because every nation in which they occur naturally has laws protecting them. Despite their CITES Appendix I status and local legal protection, slow lorises are still threatened by both local and international trade due to problems with enforcement. Surveys are needed to determine existing population densities and habitat viability for all species of slow loris. Connectivity between protected areas is important for slow lorises because they are not adapted to dispersing across the ground over large distances.

Populations of Bengal and Sunda slow lorises are not faring well in zoos. Of the 29 captive specimens in North American zoos in 2008, several are hybrids that cannot breed, while most are past their reproductive years. The last captive birth for these species in North America was in 2001 in San Diego. Pygmy slow lorises are doing better in North American zoos; from the late 1980s (when they were imported) to 2008, the population grew to 74 animals, with most of them born at the San Diego Zoo.

=== Wildlife trade ===
Even the best-breeding facilities have great difficulty breeding lorises, and those that do often have difficulty keeping them alive. It is so easy to get access to wild-caught lorises, it is highly doubtful that a seller who claims to have captive-bred ones is telling the truth.

— Primatologist Anna Nekaris, in 2009 discussing the misleading information posted on YouTube.

Until the 1960s, the hunting of slow lorises was sustainable, but due to growing demand, decreased supply, and the subsequent increased value of the marketed wildlife, slow lorises have been overexploited and are in decline. With the use of modern technology, such as battery-powered searchlights, slow lorises have become easier to hunt because of their eyeshine. Traditional medicine made from loris parts is thought to cure many diseases, and the demand for this medicine from wealthy urban areas has replaced the subsistence hunting traditionally performed in poor rural areas. A survey by primatologist Anna Nekaris and colleagues (2010) showed that these belief systems were so strong that the majority of respondents expressed reluctance to consider alternatives to loris-based medicines.

Slow lorises are sold locally at street markets but are also sold internationally over the Internet and in pet stores. They are especially popular or trendy in Japan, particularly among women. The reasons for their popularity, according to the Japan Wildlife Conservation Society, are that "they're easy to keep, they don't cry, they're small, and just very cute."

=== Common misconceptions ===
Because of their "cuteness", videos of pet slow lorises are some of the most frequently watched animal-related viral videos on YouTube. By March 2011, a newly posted video of a slow loris holding a cocktail umbrella had been viewed more than two million times, while an older video of a slow loris being tickled had been viewed more than six million times. According to Nekaris, these videos are misunderstood by most people who watch them, since most do not realize that it is illegal in most countries to own them as pets and that the slow lorises in the videos are only docile because that is their passive defensive reaction to threatening situations.

Despite frequent advertisements by pet shops in Japan, the World Conservation Monitoring Centre reported that only a few dozen slow lorises were legally imported in 2006, suggesting frequent smuggling. Slow lorises are also smuggled to China, Taiwan, Europe, Russia, the United States, and Saudi Arabia for use as pets.

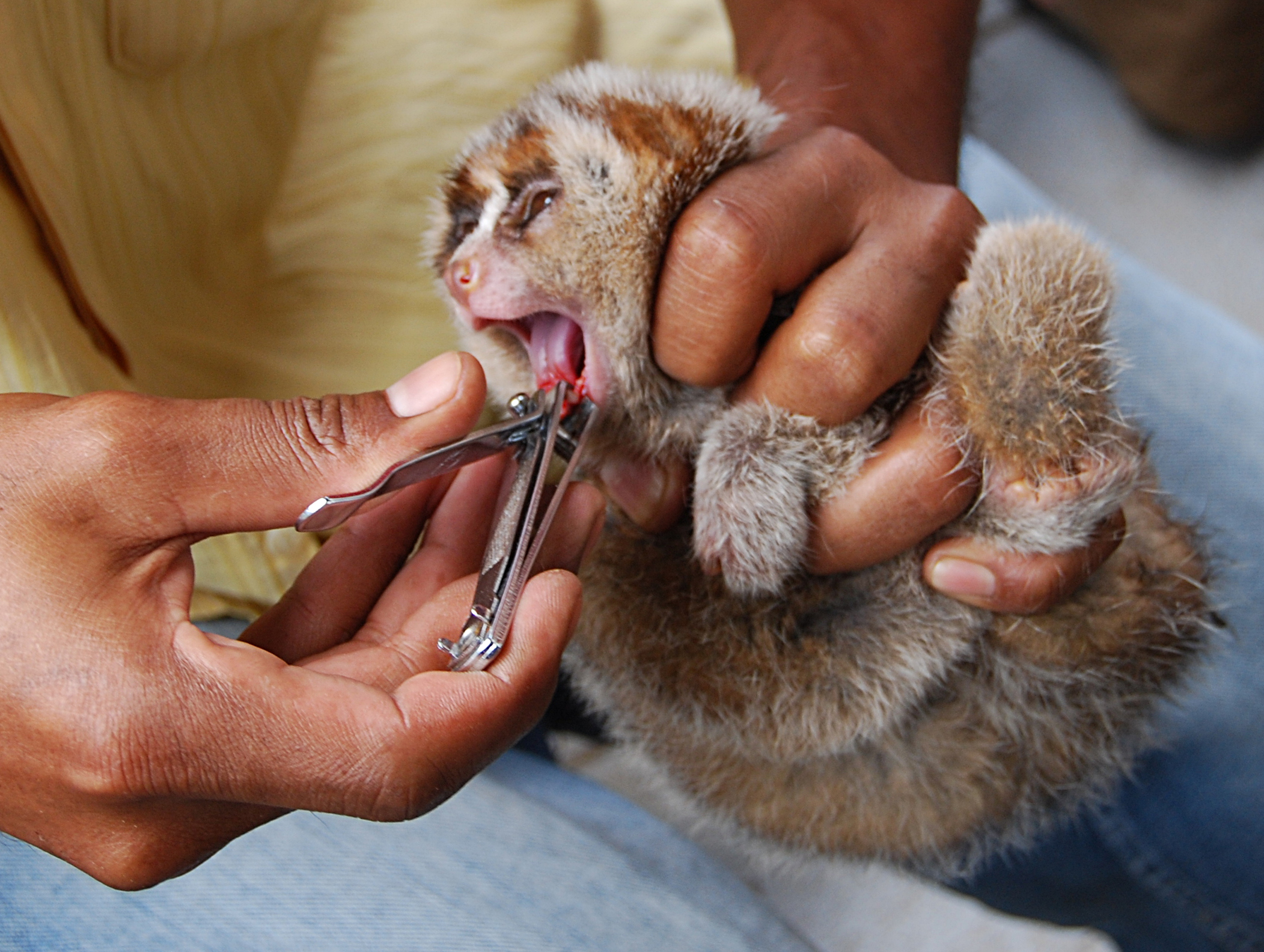
Slow lorises have their front teeth cut or pulled before being sold as pets, a practice that often causes infection and death.

Within their countries of origin, slow lorises are very popular pets, particularly in Indonesia. They are seen as a "living toy" for children by local people or are bought out of pity by Western tourists or expatriates. Neither local nor foreign buyers usually know anything about these primates, their endangered status, or that the trade is illegal. According to National Geographic, slow lorises are protected by both local laws in southern Asia and by the Convention on International Trade in Endangered Species (CITES). Furthermore, few know about their strong odor or their painful bite, which may lead to anaphylaxis in some cases. According to data compiled from monthly surveys and interviews with local traders, nearly a thousand locally sourced slow lorises exchanged hands in the Medan bird market in North Sumatra during the late first decade of the 21st century.

International trade usually involves a high mortality rate during transit, between 30% and 90%. Slow lorises also experience many health problems due to both local and international trade. In order to give the impression that the primates are tame and appropriate pets for children, to protect people from their potentially toxic bite, or to deceive buyers into thinking the animal is a baby, animal dealers either pull the front teeth with pliers or wire cutters or cut them off with nail clippers. This results in severe bleeding, which sometimes causes shock or death.

Dental infection is common and is fatal in 90% of cases. Without their teeth, the animals can no longer fend for themselves in the wild and must remain in captivity for life. The slow lorises found in animal markets are usually underweight and malnourished and have had their fur dyed, which complicates species identification at rescue centers. As many as 95% of the slow lorises rescued from the markets die of dental infection or improper care.

As part of the trade, infants are pulled prematurely from their parents, leaving them unable to remove their own urine, feces, and oily skin secretions from their fur. Slow lorises have a special network of blood vessels in their hands and feet, which makes them vulnerable to cuts when pulled from the wire cages they are kept in. Slow lorises are also stress-sensitive and do not thrive in captivity. Common health problems seen in pet slow lorises include undernourishment, tooth decay, diabetes, obesity, and kidney failure. Infection, stress, pneumonia, and poor nutrition lead to high death rates among pet lorises. Pet owners also fail to provide proper care because they are usually asleep when the nocturnal pet is awake.
