= Junggaroperadectes =

Junggaroperadectes Temporal range: Early Oligocene

Scientific classification
- Domain: Eukaryota
- Kingdom: Animalia
- Phylum: Chordata
- Class: Mammalia
- Family: †Peradectidae
- Genus: †Junggaroperadectes; Ni, Meng, Wu & Ye, 2007

Type species
- Junggaroperadectes burqinensis Ni et al., 2007

Species
- Junggaroperadectes burqinensis Ni et al., 2007

Extinct genus of metatherian mammals

Junggaroperadectes is an extinct genus of peradectine metatherian which existed in Keziletuogayi Formation, China during the early Oligocene. It was first named by Xijun Ni, Jin Meng, Wenyu Wu and Jie Ye in 2007 and the type species is Junggaroperadectes burqinensis.
