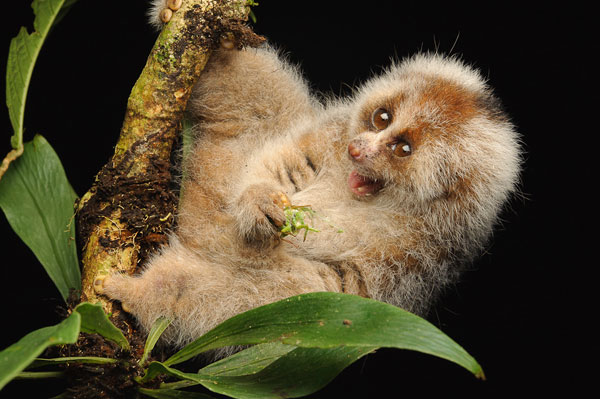

Conservation status
- Critically endangered, possibly extinct (IUCN 3.1)
- CITES Appendix I

Scientific classification
- Kingdom: Animalia
- Phylum: Chordata
- Class: Mammalia
- Order: Primates
- Suborder: Strepsirrhini
- Family: Lorisidae
- Genus: Nycticebus
- Species: N. bancanus

Binomial name
- Nycticebus bancanus (Lyon, 1906)

= Nycticebus bancanus =

Bangka slow loris

Species of primate

The Bangka slow loris (Nycticebus bancanus) is a strepsirrhine primate and a species of slow loris that is native to southwestern Borneo and the island of Bangka. Originally considered a subspecies or synonym of the Bornean slow loris (N. menagensis), it was promoted to full species status in 2013 when a study of museum specimens and photographs identified distinct facial markings, which helped to differentiate it as a separate species. It is distinguished by the crimson red fur on its back, light-colored facial features, as well as the shape and width of the stripes of its facial markings.

As with other slow lorises, this arboreal and nocturnal species primarily eats insects, tree gum, nectar, and fruit and has a toxic bite, a unique feature among primates. Although not yet evaluated by the International Union for Conservation of Nature (IUCN), it is likely to be listed as "Vulnerable" or placed in a higher-risk category when its conservation status is assessed. It is primarily threatened by habitat loss and the illegal wildlife trade.

== Taxonomy and phylogeny ==
N. bancanus is a strepsirrhine primate, and species of slow loris (genus Nycticebus) within the family Lorisidae. Museum specimens of this animal had previously been identified as the Bornean slow loris (Nycticebus menagensis), first described by the English naturalist Richard Lydekker in 1893 as Lemur menagensis. In 1906, Marcus Ward Lyon, Jr. first described N. bancanus, noting that it was a "well-marked offshoot of N. borneanus, which he also first described in the same publication. By 1953, all of the slow lorises were lumped together into a single species, the Sunda slow loris (Nycticebus coucang). In 1971, that view was updated by distinguishing the pygmy slow loris (N. pygmaeus) as a species, and by further recognizing four subspecies, including N. coucang menagensis, the Bornean slow loris. From then until 2005, N. bancanus was considered a synonym of the Bornean slow loris, which was elevated to the species level (as N. menagensis) in 2006, when molecular analysis showed it to be genetically distinct from N. coucang.

A 2013 review of museum specimens and photographs attributed to N. menagensis resulted in elevating two of its former subspecies to the species N. bancanus and N. borneanus. Additionally, N. kayan emerged as a new species, which had previously been overlooked. All newly recognized or elevated species showed significant differences in their "face mask"—the coloration patterns on their face.

== Physical description ==
Like other slow lorises, it has a vestigial tail, round head, and short ears. It has a rhinarium (the moist, naked surface around the nostrils of the nose) and a broad, flat face with large eyes. Like N. menagensis, this and all other Bornean species lack a second upper incisor, which distinguishes them from other slow lorises. On its front feet, the second digit is smaller than the rest; the big toe on its hind foot opposes the other toes, which enhances its gripping power. Its second toe on the hind foot has a curved grooming claw that it uses for scratching and grooming, while the other nails are straight. It also possesses a specialized arrangement of lower front teeth, called a toothcomb, which is also used for grooming, as with other lemuriform primates. On the ventral side of its elbow, it has a small swelling called the brachial gland, which secretes a pungent, clear oily toxin that the animal uses defensively by wiping it on its toothcomb.

N. bancanus has distinct crimson red fur on its back, the facial markings (facemask) are light in color, and the upper edges of the dark rings around the eyes (circumocular patch) are diffuse, and not rounded or pointed like some of the other slow lorises from Borneo. The circumocular patch does not extend below the zygomatic arch, and the stripe between its eyes is wide. The colored patched on the top of the head is diffused, the band of hair in front of the ears is narrow, and the ears are covered in hair. The body length averages 258.05 mm (10.159 in).

== Distribution ==
N. bancanus is found in southwestern Borneo, in the Indonesian provinces of West and South Kalimantan, as well as the island of Bangka. On Borneo, its range extends south of the Kapuas River and east towards—but not reaching—the Barito River. The Bangka population is allopatric with the other Bornean species, but the population on Borneo may exhibit some sympatry with N. borneanus in the province of West Kalimantan.

== Habitat and ecology ==
Like other slow lorises, N. bancanus is arboreal, nocturnal, and omnivorous, eating primarily insects, tree gum, nectar, and fruit. Likewise, this species has a toxic bite, a unique feature found only in slow lorises among primates. The toxin is produced by licking a brachial gland (a gland by their elbow), and the secretion mixes with its saliva to activate. Their toxic bite is a deterrent to predators, and the toxin is also applied to the fur during grooming as a form of protection for their infants. When threatened, slow lorises may also lick their brachial glands and bite their aggressors, delivering the toxin into the wounds. Slow lorises can be reluctant to release their bite, which is likely to maximize the transfer of toxins.

The face mask may help the species identify potential mates by distinguishing species, and may serve as an anti-predator strategy by making its eyes appear larger than they really are.

== Conservation ==
While this new species has yet to be assessed by the IUCN, N. menagensis was listed as "Vulnerable" as of 2012. Because that species has been divided into four distinct species, each of the new species faces a higher risk of extinction. Accordingly, each of them are expected to be listed as "Vulnerable" at the least, with some of them likely to be assigned to a higher-risk category.

Between 1987 and 2012, one-third of Borneo's forests have been lost, making habitat loss one of the greatest threats to the survival of N. bancanus. The illegal wildlife trade is also a major factor, with loris parts commonly sold in traditional medicine and viral videos on YouTube promoting the exotic pet trade. However, all slow loris species are protected from commercial trade under Appendix I of CITES.

In October 2026, a study published in Spixiana confirmed the continued existence of the Bangka slow loris on Indonesia's Bangka Island, following an absence from the scientific literature dating back to the 1930s. Previously classified by the IUCN as critically endangered and possibly extinct, the species was documented through records collected by the Alobi Wildlife Rescue Center between 2015 and 2025. During this period, more than 90 individuals were rescued from locations across the island, of which 86 were subsequently released into suitable habitats. The findings confirmed that the species persists in several areas despite extensive habitat destruction caused by tin mining and oil palm plantations.
