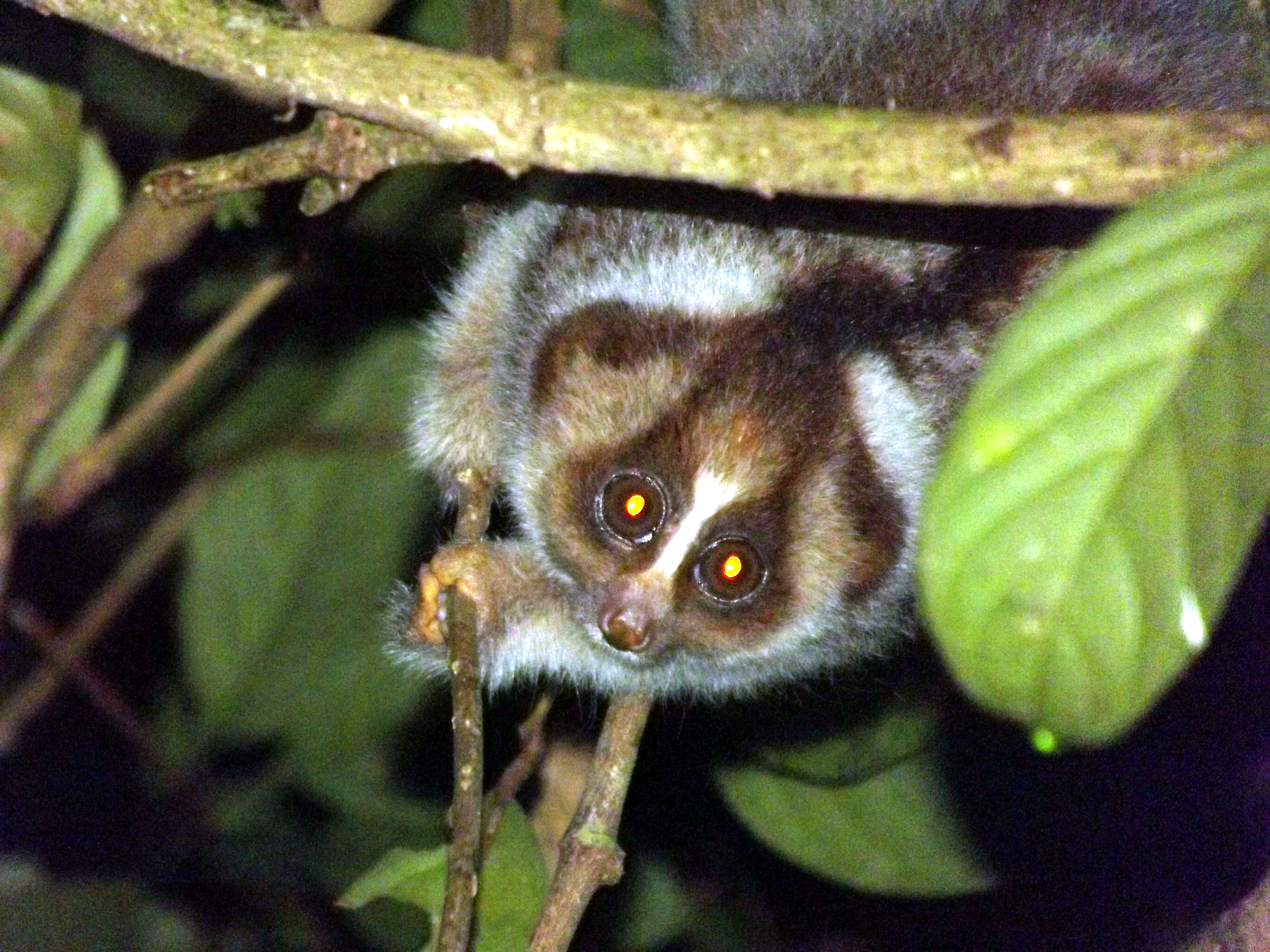

Conservation status
- Vulnerable (IUCN 3.1)
- CITES Appendix I

Scientific classification
- Kingdom: Animalia
- Phylum: Chordata
- Class: Mammalia
- Infraclass: Placentalia
- Order: Primates
- Suborder: Strepsirrhini
- Family: Lorisidae
- Genus: Nycticebus
- Species: N. kayan

Binomial name
- Nycticebus kayan Munds, Nekaris & Ford, 2013

= Nycticebus kayan =

Kayan River slow loris

Species of primate

The Kayan River slow loris (Nycticebus kayan) is a strepsirrhine primate and a species of slow loris that is native to the northern and central highland region of the island of Borneo. The species was originally thought to be a part of the Bornean slow loris (N. menagensis) population until 2013, when a study of museum specimens and photographs identified distinct facial markings, which helped to differentiate it. It is distinguished by the high contrast of its black and white facial features, as well as the shape and width of the stripes of its facial markings.

The species is named after the Kayan River, which runs through its native habitat. As with other slow lorises, this arboreal and nocturnal species primarily eats insects, tree gum, nectar, and fruit and has a toxic bite, a unique feature among primates.

N. kayan has been assessed by the International Union for Conservation of Nature (IUCN) as "Vulnerable". They estimate that this species has experienced a 30% reduction in population over the past three generations (approximately 21-24 years), and project a further reduction by another 30% over the next three generations. It is primarily threatened by habitat loss and the illegal wildlife trade.

== Taxonomy and phylogeny ==
N. kayan is a strepsirrhine primate and a species of slow loris (known collectively as the genus Nycticebus), within the loris family (Lorisidae). Prior to 2013, museum specimens of this animal had been identified as the Bornean slow loris (Nycticebus menagensis), which had first been described by the English naturalist Richard Lydekker in 1893 as Lemur menagensis. However, in 1939 Reginald Innes Pocock consolidated all slow lorises into a single species, N. coucang. Primatologist William Charles Osman Hill continued this course in his influential 1953 book, Primates: Comparative Anatomy and Taxonomy. In 1971, that view was refined by Colin Groves, who recognized the pygmy slow loris (N. pygmaeus) as a separate species. He also divided N. coucang into four subspecies, – one of those being N. coucang menagensis, the Bornean slow loris. The subspecies N. c. menagensis was elevated to the species level (as N. menagensis) in 2006, when molecular analysis showed it to be genetically distinct from N. coucang.

A 2013 review of all museum specimens and photographs attributed to N. menagensis showed that they in fact comprised a species complex. First, two former subspecies of N. menagensis were elevated to the two distinct species N. bancanus and N. borneanus. Further, N. kayan was recognized as a new species that is also distinct from the nominate subspecies, N. menagensis. All newly recognized or elevated species showed significant differences in their "facemask"—the coloration patterns on their face. Analysis of the facemask patterns suggests that N. kayan diverged from N. menagensis and N. borneanus through sympatric speciation (divergent evolution of organisms living in the same geographic region), while geographic barriers may account for its divergence with N. bancanus (allopatric speciation).

N. kayan is named after the Kayan River, which runs through its native habitat and near Peleben, the type locality of the original specimen. The holotype, AMNH 106012, was originally collected on 8 October 1935 by Baron V. von Plessen near Peleben in the province of East Kalimantan in Borneo and is housed in the American Museum of Natural History in New York. It consists of a male skin and skull, with a head-body length of 257.3 mm (10.1 in).

== Physical description ==
Like other slow lorises, it has a vestigial tail, round head, and short ears. It has a rhinarium (the moist, naked surface around the nostrils of the nose) and a broad, flat face with large eyes. Like N. menagensis, this and all other Bornean species lack a second upper incisor, which distinguishes them from other slow lorises. On its front feet, the second digit is smaller than the rest; the big toe on its hind foot opposes the other toes, which enhances its gripping power. Its second toe on the hind foot has a curved grooming claw that it uses for scratching and grooming, while the other nails are straight. It also possesses a specialized arrangement of lower front teeth, called a toothcomb, which is also used for grooming, as with other lemuriform primates. On the ventral side of its elbow, it has a small swelling called the brachial gland, which secretes a pungent, clear oily toxin that the animal uses defensively by wiping it on its toothcomb.

The face mask of N. kayan differs from those of other Bornean lorises in several ways. First, the top of the dark ring around its eyes is either rounded or pointed (not diffuse at the edges) and the bottom stretches below the zygomatic arch, and sometimes extends as far down as the jaw. Second, the stripe between the eyes is occasionally bulb-shaped, compared to the rectangular stripe seen in the neighboring species. Also, a light band of fur in front of the ears is usually intermediate in width compared to the narrow and wide bands seen in the other Bornean species. Compared to N. menagensis, the facemask of N. kayan has more contrast between its dark black and white features, and its ears are always covered in hair, whereas those of N. menagensis are generally naked. Overall, its fur is generally longer and fluffier compared to N. menagensis. Based on a limited number of specimens, the species is about 273.4 mm (10.8 in) long, and weighs about 410.5 g (0.9 lb).

== Distribution ==
N. kayan is found in central and northern Borneo. Its range extends south to the Mahakam and Rajang Rivers in the Indonesian province of East Kalimantan and the Malaysian province of Sarawak, respectively, and north to southern side of Mount Kinabalu in the Malaysian province of Sabah. Although it is not found along the coast, its northern range spans Borneo from east to west. Its range overlaps that of N. menagensis in East Kalimantan, Sabah, and Sarawak, except unlike N. menagensis, it appears not to be found along the east part of Sabah. N. borneanus is a neighboring species to the southwest.

== Habitat and ecology ==
Like other slow lorises, N. kayan is arboreal, nocturnal, and omnivorous, eating primarily insects, tree gum, nectar, and fruit. Likewise, this species has a toxic bite, a unique feature found only in slow lorises among primates. The toxin is produced by licking a brachial gland (a gland by its elbow), and the secretion mixes with its saliva to activate. The toxic bite is a deterrent to predators, and the toxin is also applied to the fur during grooming as a form of protection for infants. When threatened, slow lorises may also lick their brachial glands and bite the aggressors, delivering the toxin into the wound. Slow lorises can be reluctant to release their bite, which is likely to maximize the transfer of toxins.

The face mask may help the species identify potential mates by distinguishing species, and may serve as an anti-predator strategy by making its eyes appear larger than they really are.

== Conservation ==
Nycticebus kayan has been assessed by the IUCN as "Vulnerable" as of 2020. It is estimated that there has been more than a 30% reduction in population over the past three generations (approximately 21-24 years), and it is projected that the current population may be further reduced by another 30% over the next three generations.

Deforestation in Borneo and its associated habitat loss has been and continues to be one of the greatest threats to the survival of N. kayan. Between 1987 and 2012, one-third of Borneo's forests were lost. Much of that lost habitat has been converted, especially into palm oil plantations, or cleared by logging for tropical timber. Recurrent forest fires on Borneo have also contributed to significant loss of habitat and degraded air quality.

All slow loris species are protected from commercial trade under Appendix I of the Convention on International Trade in Endangered Species of Wild Fauna and Flora (CITES). Still, the illegal wildlife trade is a major threat to this species, with loris parts commonly sold for traditional medicine. Further, viral videos on YouTube promote the exotic pet trade. Subsequent release of unwanted pets back into the wild can introduce new threats. Slow lorises may also be caught by tourists and used as photo props.

Hybridization poses another threat to this species, both in the wild and for confiscated individuals in rescue centers.
