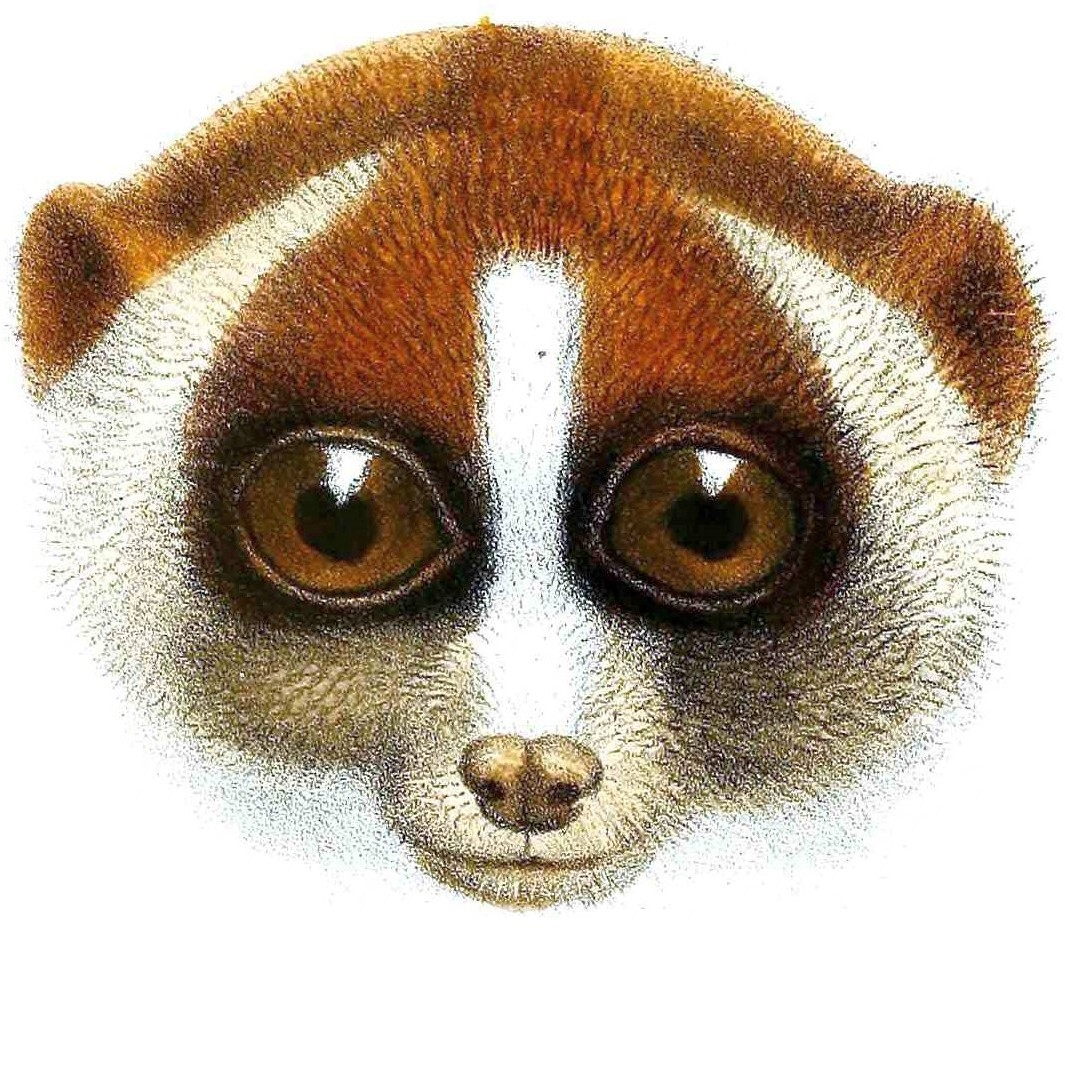

Conservation status
- Endangered (IUCN 3.1)

Scientific classification
- Domain: Eukaryota
- Kingdom: Animalia
- Phylum: Chordata
- Class: Mammalia
- Order: Primates
- Suborder: Strepsirrhini
- Family: Lorisidae
- Genus: Nycticebus
- Species: N. hilleri

Binomial name
- Nycticebus hilleri Stone & Rehn, 1902

= Sumatran slow loris =

Species of primate

The Sumatran slow loris (Nycticebus hilleri) is a strepsirrhine primate and a species of slow loris that is native to Sumatra.

While this species used to be considered a junior synonym of the Sunda slow loris, it is now recognized by the IUCN as a full species. This species is named after Hiram M. Hiller Jr., who collected the holotype of this species while exploring the East Indies in 1901.
