= Open nomenclature =

Vocabulary of taxonomical terms

Open nomenclature is a vocabulary of partly informal terms and signs in which a taxonomist may express remarks about their own material. This is in contrast to synonymy lists, in which a taxonomist may express remarks on the work of others. Commonly such remarks take the form of abbreviated taxonomic expressions in biological classification.

== Usage of open nomenclature ==
There are no strict conventions in open nomenclature concerning which expressions to use or where to place them in the Latin name of a species or other taxon, and this may lead to difficulties of interpretation. However, the most significant unsettled issues concern the way that their meanings are to be interpreted. The International Code of Zoological Nomenclature (ICZN) makes no reference to open nomenclature, leaving its use and meaning open for interpretation by taxonomists.

The following are examples of commonly used shorthand in open nomenclature:

- Sp. (pl. spp.; short for "species") indicates potentially new species without remarking on its possible affinity. This suggests either that identification has not yet been completed or that currently available evidence and material are insufficient to allocate the specimens to relevant known taxa, or alternatively, that as yet the specimen cannot be assigned to a new taxon of its own with sufficient confidence.
- Sp. aff. or aff. (short for "species affinis") indicates a potentially new and undescribed species has an affinity to, but is not identical to, the named species.
- Cf. (short for the Latin: confer, "compare with") or a question mark (?, also inc., species incerta) signify varying degrees or types of uncertainty and may be used differently depending on the author. In more recent usage, "cf." indicates greater uncertainty than a question mark.
- V. (short for the Latin: vidimus, meaning "we have seen") means that the author inspected the original type specimens and are basing their statements on first-hand experience. Sometimes the opposite is expressed as "non v." (non vidimus), meaning that the original has never been observed, as is the case with many kinds of fungal spore, for instance.

== See also ==
- Candidatus, a candidate taxon proposed from metagenomics or other incomplete information
- Incertae sedis, a taxon of uncertain position in a classification
- Nomen dubium (nomen ambiguum), a name of unknown or doubtful application
- Nomen novum a new name, usually to replace a name that in some way is unacceptable, say because it is a junior synonym
- Nomen nudum an apparent taxon name, usually in the correct binomial form, but invalid, for instance because of not having been published with an adequate description.
- Species inquirenda, a species that in the opinion of the taxonomist requires further investigation
- Similar Latin terms in the glossary of scientific naming
