= Nycticebus borneanus =

- Bornean slow loris in Sultan Adam Grand Forest Park, South Kalimantan, Indonesia

Conservation status
- Vulnerable (IUCN 3.1)
- CITES Appendix I

Scientific classification
- Kingdom: Animalia
- Phylum: Chordata
- Class: Mammalia
- Order: Primates
- Suborder: Strepsirrhini
- Family: Lorisidae
- Genus: Nycticebus
- Species: N. borneanus

Binomial name
- Nycticebus borneanus (Lyon, 1906)

Species of primate

Nycticebus borneanus, the Bornean slow loris, is a strepsirrhine primate and a species of slow loris that is native to central south Borneo in Indonesia. Formerly considered a subspecies or synonym of N. menagensis, it was promoted to full species status in 2013 when a study of museum specimens and photographs identified distinct facial markings, which helped to differentiate it as a separate species. It is distinguished by its dark, contrasting facial features, as well as the shape and width of the stripes of its facial markings.

As with other slow lorises, this arboreal and nocturnal species primarily eats insects, tree gum, nectar, and fruit and has a toxic bite, a unique feature among primates. The International Union for Conservation of Nature (IUCN) assessed it as "Vulnerable" in 2020. It is primarily threatened by habitat loss and the illegal wildlife trade.

== Taxonomy and phylogeny ==
N. borneanus is a strepsirrhine primate, and species of slow loris (genus Nycticebus) within the family Lorisidae. Museum specimens of this animal had previously been identified as the Bornean slow loris using the scientific name Nycticebus menagensis – first described by the English naturalist Richard Lydekker in 1893 as Lemur menagensis, – a scientific name now assigned exclusively to the Philippine slow loris. In 1906, Marcus Ward Lyon Jr. first described N. borneanus from western Borneo. By 1953, all of the slow lorises were lumped together into a single species, the Sunda slow loris (Nycticebus coucang). In 1971, that view was updated by distinguishing the pygmy slow loris (N. pygmaeus) as a species, and by further recognizing four subspecies, including N. coucang menagensis. From then until 2005, N. borneanus was considered a synonym of N. menagensis. The latter was elevated to the species level in 2006, when molecular analysis showed it to be genetically distinct from N. coucang.

A 2013 review of museum specimens and photographs attributed to N. menagensis resulted in elevating two of its former subspecies to species: N. bancanus and N. borneanus. Additionally, N. kayan emerged as a new species, which had previously been overlooked. All newly recognized or elevated species showed significant differences in their "face mask"—the coloration patterns on their face.

== Physical description ==
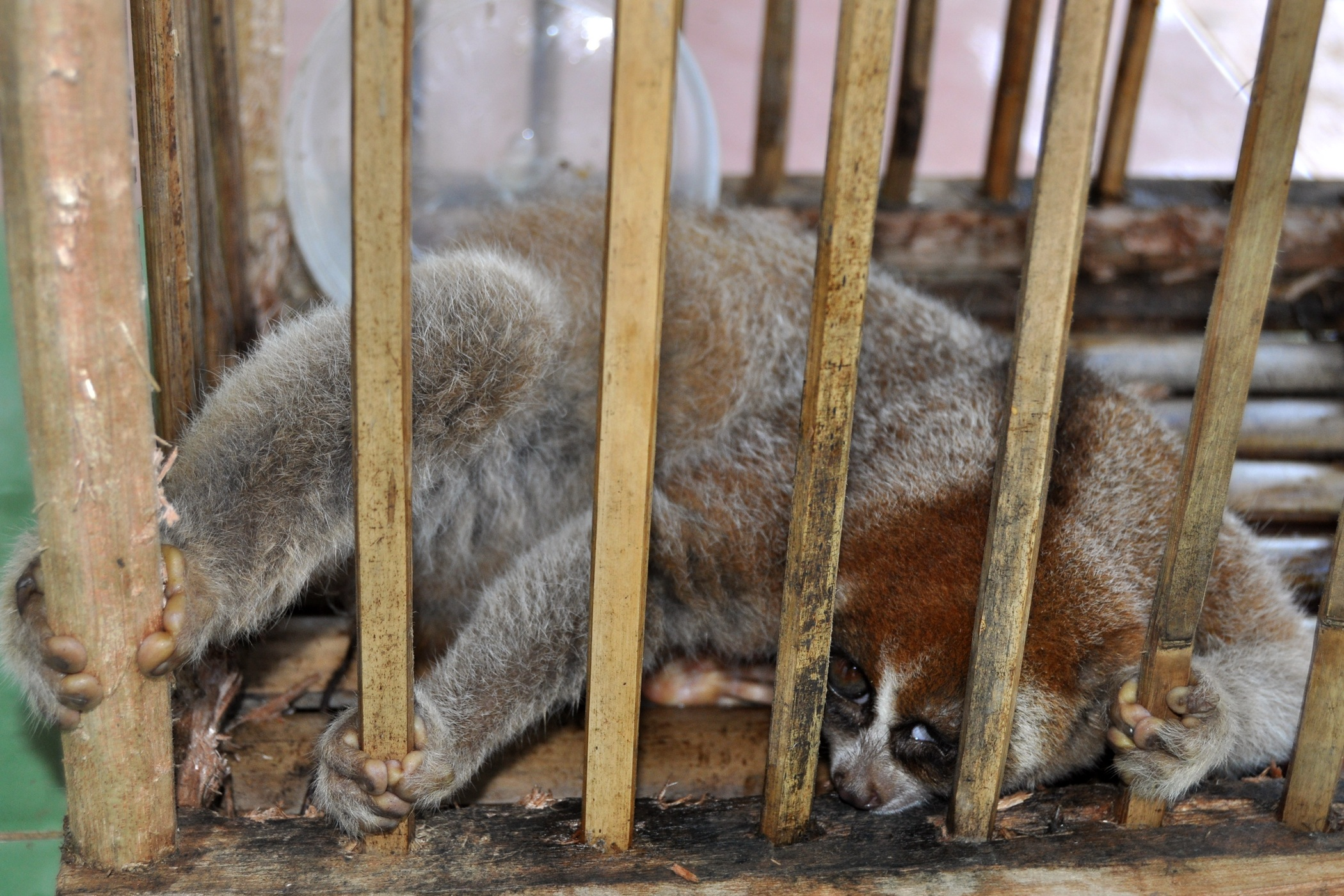
Female, from Nanga Tayap, Ketapang Regency

Like other slow lorises, it has a vestigial tail, round head, and short ears. It has a rhinarium (the moist, naked surface around the nostrils of the nose) and a broad, flat face with large eyes. Like N. menagensis, this and all other Bornean species lack a second upper incisor, which distinguishes them from other slow lorises. On its front feet, the second digit is smaller than the rest; the big toe on its hind foot opposes the other toes, which enhances its gripping power. Its second toe on the hind foot has a curved grooming claw that it uses for scratching and grooming, while the other nails are straight. It also possesses a specialized arrangement of lower front teeth, called a toothcomb, which is also used for grooming, as with other lemuriform primates. On the ventral side of its elbow, it has a small swelling called the brachial gland, which secretes a pungent, clear oily toxin that the animal uses defensively by wiping it on its toothcomb.

The facial markings of N. borneanus are dark and contrasting. The dark rings around its eyes are usually rounded on top, though sometimes diffuse-edged, and they never reach below the zygomatic arch. The stripe between the eyes often varies in width, the ears are covered in hair, and the band of hair in front of the ears is wide. The colored patch on the top of the head is usually round, but is sometimes a narrower band. The body length averages 260.1 mm (10.24 in) for the species.

== Distribution ==
N. borneanus is found in central south Borneo, in the Indonesian provinces of West, South, and Central Kalimantan. Its range extends south of the Kapuas River and east to the Barito River. However, N. borneanus is not found in the extreme southwest of the island. It may be sympatric with N. bancanus in the province of West Kalimantan.

== Habitat and ecology ==
Like other slow lorises, N. borneanus is arboreal, nocturnal, and omnivorous, eating primarily insects, tree gum, nectar, and fruit. Likewise, this species has a toxic bite, a unique feature found only in slow lorises among primates. The toxin is produced by licking a brachial gland (a gland by their elbow), and the secretion mixes with its saliva to activate. Their toxic bite is a deterrent to predators, and the toxin is also applied to the fur during grooming as a form of protection for their infants. When threatened, slow lorises may also lick their brachial glands and bite their aggressors, delivering the toxin into the wounds. Slow lorises can be reluctant to release their bite, which is likely to maximize the transfer of toxins.

The face mask may help the species identify potential mates by distinguishing species, and may serve as an anti-predator strategy by making its eyes appear larger than they really are.

== Conservation ==
While this new species has yet to be assessed by the IUCN, N. menagensis was listed as "Vulnerable" as of 2012. Because that species has been divided into four distinct species, each of the new species faces a higher risk of extinction. Accordingly, each of them are expected to be listed as "Vulnerable" at the least, with some of them likely to be assigned to a higher-risk category.

Between 1987 and 2012, one-third of Borneo's forests have been lost, making habitat loss one of the greatest threats to the survival of N. borneanus. The illegal wildlife trade is also a major factor, with loris parts commonly sold in traditional medicine and viral videos on YouTube promoting the exotic pet trade. However, all slow loris species are protected from commercial trade under Appendix I of CITES.
