= MN 4 (biostratigraphy) =

In biostratigraphy, MN 4 is one of the MN zones used to characterize the fossil mammal faunas of the Neogene of Europe. It is preceded by MN 3 and followed by MN 5; together, these three zones form the Orleanian age of the middle Miocene. This zone starts within magnetostratigraphic chron C5Dr, at 18 million years ago, and ends within chron C5Cr, at 17.0 million years ago, although some different correlations have been proposed.

The reference locality used to correlate faunas with this zone is La Romieu (southwestern France); other localities include Artesilla and Buñol in Spain, Tägernaustrasse-Jona in Switzerland, Erkertshofen 2 and Petersbuch 2 in Germany, Belchatov C in Poland, and Aliveri in Greece.

In this zone, the common muroid rodent Democricetodon immigrates into Europe from Asia, followed shortly after by three other muroids: Megacricetodon, Eumyarion, and Anomalomys. Cricetodon, which later also reaches western Europe, is only present in Greece in MN 4 in Europe. The archaic muroid Melissiodon last appears in MN 4, as does Ligerimys, a member of the extinct rodent family Eomyidae. The dormouse Glirulus, which occurs in older deposits in Turkey, first appears in Europe; this genus contains a single living species, the Japanese dormouse (Glirulus japonicus).

The proboscidean genera—members of the group that includes the elephants—Archaeobelodon and Prodeinotherium first appear in Europe. The rhinoceros Diaceratherium last appears in MN 4 and five other rhinoceros genera, Plesiaceratherium, Brachypotherium, Lartetotherium, Gaindatherium, and Hispanotherium, make their first appearance. Phyllotillon, a member of the related extinct family Chalicotheriidae, migrates into Europe during MN 4. Several artiodactyls, such as the pig Bunolistriodon, the tragulid Dorcatherium, the deer-like Lagomeryx, the bovid-like Amphimoschus, and the first true bovid of Europe, Eotragus, first occur during MN 4. The last occurrence of the primitive ruminant Amphitragulus also falls in this zone. The immigrant African creodont Hyainailouros occurs in Europe during MN 4. Among carnivorans, the first occurrences of the mustelid Leptoplesictis and the saber-toothed Prosansanosmilus fall in MN 4.

== Literature cited ==
- Mein, P. 1999. European Miocene mammal biochronology. Pp. 25–38 in Rössner, G.E. and Heissig, K. (eds.). The Miocene Land Mammals of Europe. Munich: Verlag Dr. Friedrich Pfeil, 515 pp.
- Steininger, F. 1999. Chronostratigraphy, geochronology and biochronology of the Miocene "European Land Mammal Mega-Zones (ELMMZ)" and the Miocene "Mammal Zones (MN-Zones)". Pp. 9–24 in Rössner, G.E. and Heissig, K. (eds.). The Miocene Land Mammals of Europe. Munich: Verlag Dr. Friedrich Pfeil, 515 pp.
