= Grooming claw =

Claw or nail on the foot of certain primates, used for personal grooming

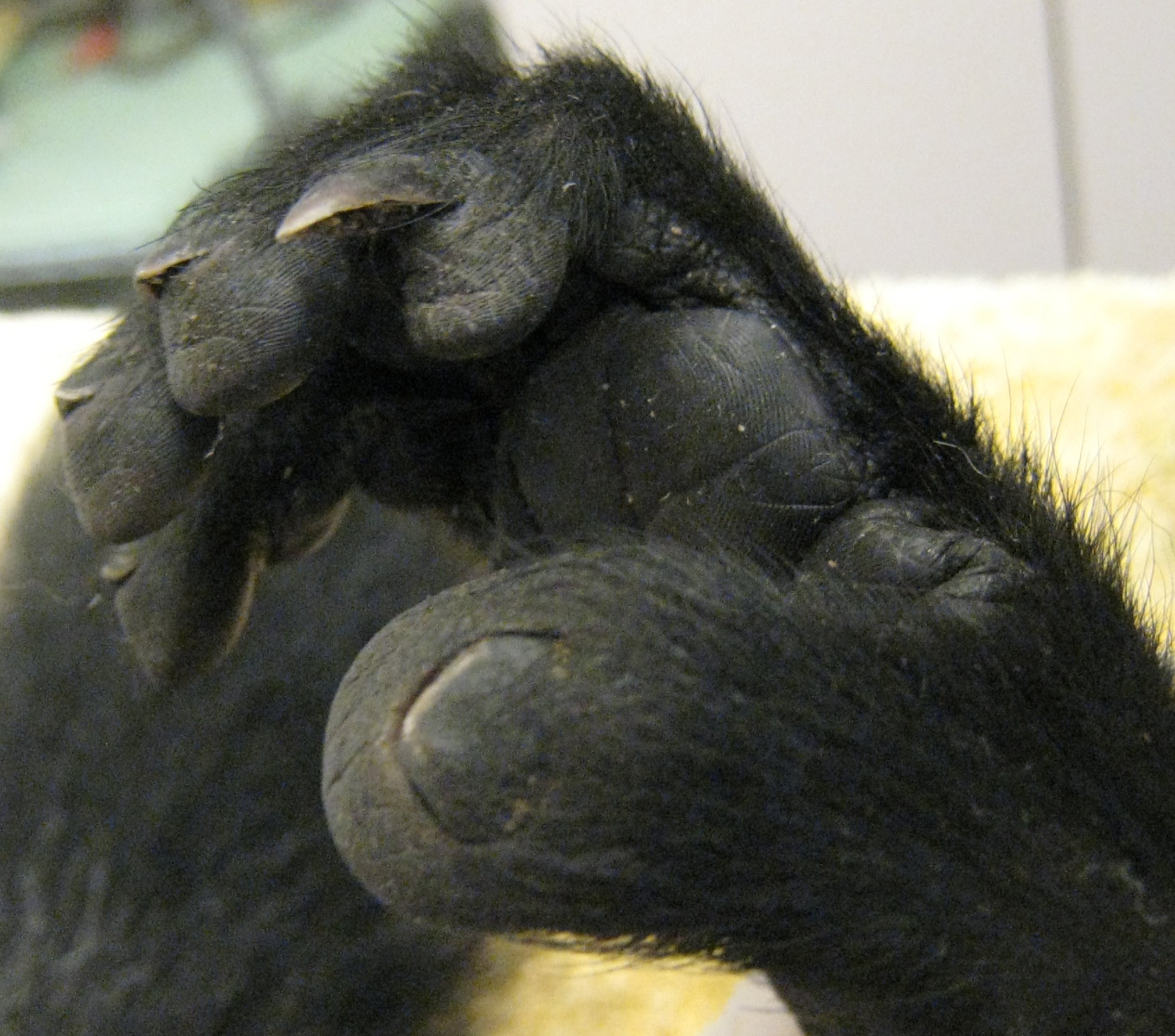
Close-up of a ruffed lemur's foot, showing the toilet-claw on the second toe and nails on all other toes

A grooming claw (or toilet claw) is the specialized claw or nail on the foot of certain primates, used for personal grooming. All prosimians have a grooming claw, but the digit that is specialized in this manner varies. Tarsiers have a grooming claw on second and third toes. In the suborder Strepsirrhini, which includes lemurs, galagos and lorises, the grooming claw is on the second toe. Less commonly known, a grooming claw is also found on the second pedal digit of night monkeys (Aotus), titis (Callicebus), and possibly other New World monkeys.

The first toe is the large one, the equivalent of a human big toe. However, in all these prosimians the foot is more or less hand-like. The first toe is opposable, like a human thumb, and the second and third toes correspond approximately to the index and middle fingers.

Like a claw or a nail, the grooming claw is also made of keratin. It resembles a claw in both its lateral compression and longitudinal curvature. However, the tip is not as pointed, and it always stands at a steeper angle, a characteristic that also distinguishes it from a nail.

== Function ==
The grooming claw is used in personal grooming to rake through the fur or scratch, particularly around the head and neck.
