= Kali Tiger Reserve =

Protected area and tiger reserve in Karnataka, India

- IUCN category II (national park)
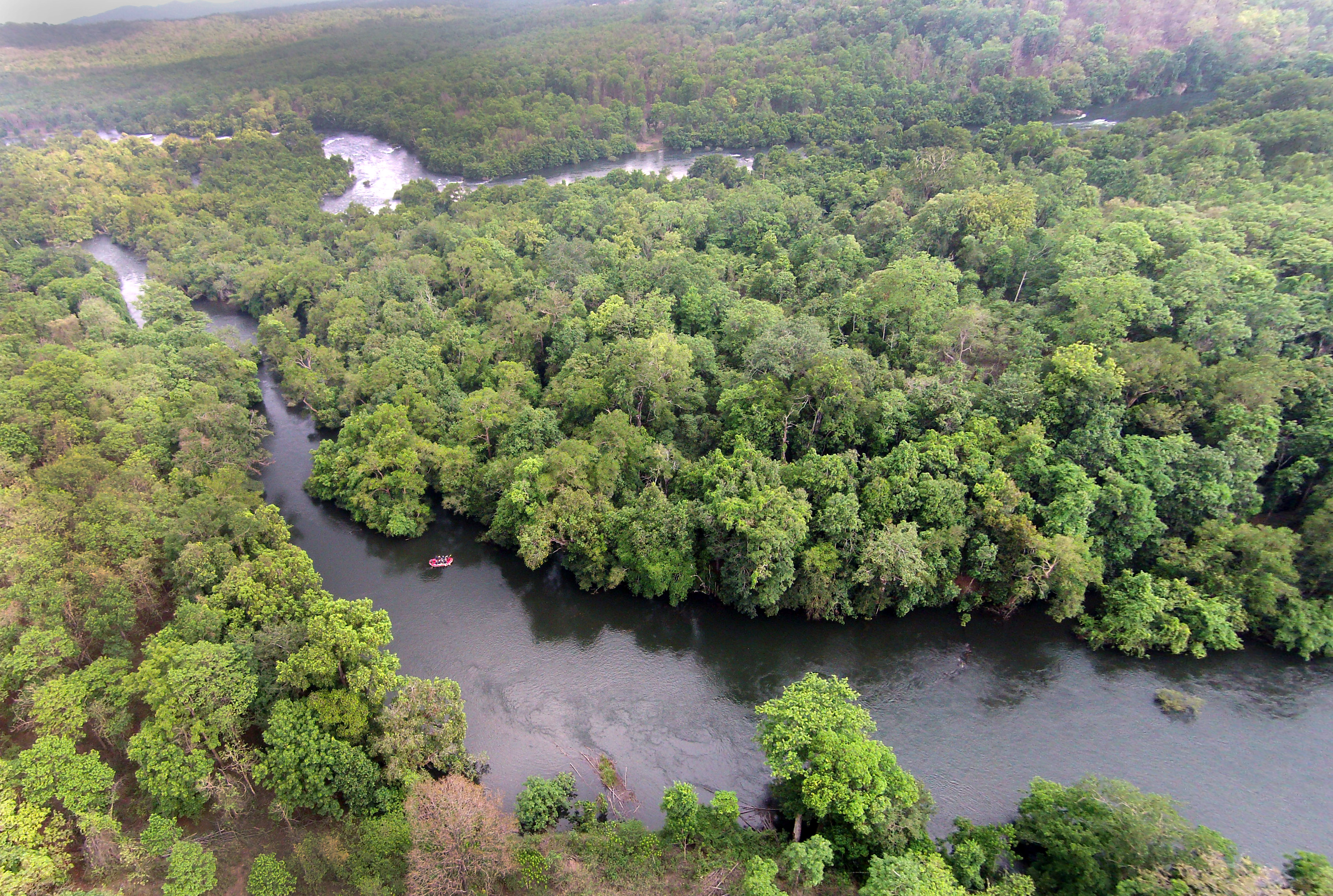
- Kali River flowing through the reserve

- Location within Karnataka Location within India
- Interactive map of Kali Tiger Reserve
- Location: Uttara Kannada district, Karnataka, India
- Nearest city: Dandeli
- Coordinates: 15°1′N 74°23′E
- Area: 1,345.5827 km^{2} (519.5324 sq mi)
- Established: 2 September 1987
- Governing body: Principal Chief Conservator of Forests (Wildlife), Karnataka
- Website: Official website

Kali Tiger Reserve (formerly Dandeli-Anshi Tiger Reserve) is a protected area and tiger reserve. It is located in Uttara Kannada district, in Karnataka, India. The park is a habitat of Bengal tigers, black panthers and Indian elephants, amongst other distinctive fauna. The Kali River flows through the tiger reserve and is the lifeline of the ecosystem and hence the name. The tiger reserve is spread over an area of 1300 square kilometres.

== History ==
The forest in the area was declared the Dandeli Wildlife Sanctuary on 10 May 1956. The state proposed carving out a section of the sanctuary to form the Anshi national park, which was implemented on 2 September 1987. The initial proposal covered 250 square kilometres. When the final notification of the park area was issued in 2002, it was extended by another 90 square kilometres.

It was renamed to Kali Tiger Reserve in December 2015. The park is home to several hydroelectric dams and a nuclear power station.

== Renaming of Anshi Tiger Reserve ==
It is notable that Anshi National Park and Dandeli Wildlife Sanctuary were together granted the status of Project Tiger tiger reserve, being declared as 'Anshi Dandeli Tiger Reserve' in January, 2007. The 340 km^{2} (130 sq mi) Anshi park adjoins the Dandeli Wildlife Sanctuary, and together with six adjacent protected areas in the states of Goa and Maharashtra, forms an almost uninterrupted protected forest area of over 2,200 km^{2} (850 sq mi).

In December 2015, Dandeli Anshi Tiger reserve was renamed to Kali Tiger Reserve (JOIDA). The river Kali is the lifeline of the people of Uttara Kannada district and integrates Dandeli Wildlife Sanctuary (DWS) spread across 400 km^{2} and Anshi National Park (ANP) spread across 500 km^{2}. The river cuts across the whole park and the renaming has given the area a single identity. The change of name was also to bring focus and awareness to Kali River. The name change was prompted following a universal response from policymakers after the release of the movie Kali which brought to importance the role of Kali River to the ecosystem.

== Geography ==
Located in the Western Ghats range from 14°54' to 15°07' N latitude and 74°16' to 74°30' E longitude, Kali Tiger Reserve's elevation varies from 27–1,059 m (89–3,474 ft) above MSL. Despite high rainfall in this area, water holes go dry very early in the summer because the soil is laterite, with minimal water-holding capacity.

== Park management ==
The management of National parks and sanctuaries in the state is the responsibility of the Principal Chief Conservator of Forests (Wildlife). Kali Tiger Reserve is headed by the Director of the Park who is also the Chief Conservator of Forests.

== Flora ==
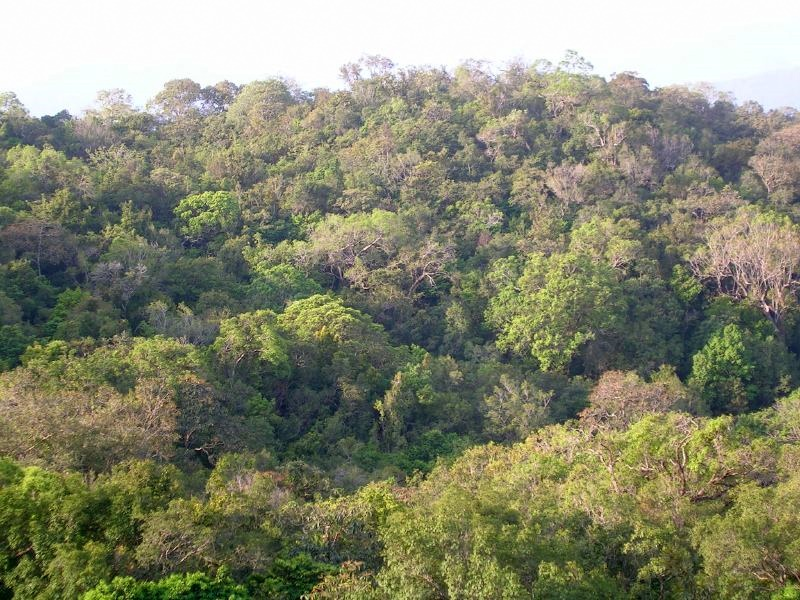
Anshi National Park forest canopy

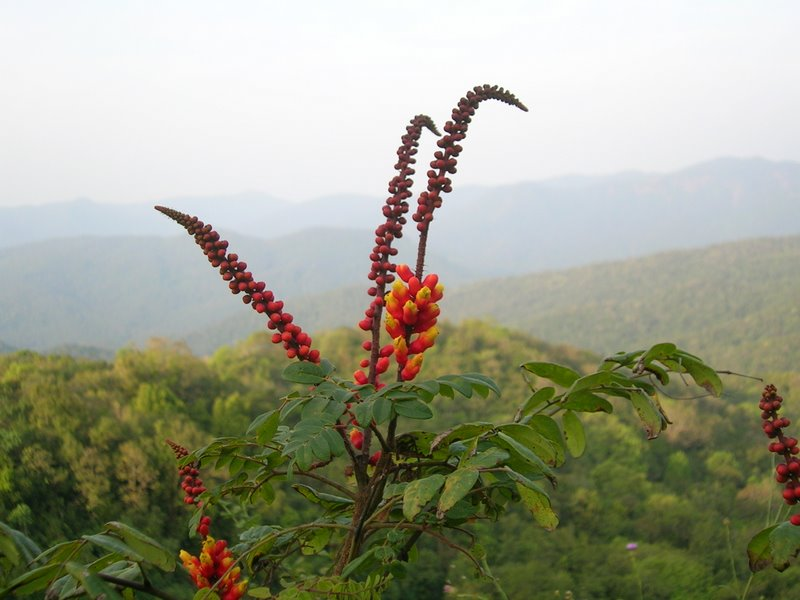
Medicinal candy corn plant

The park is in the ecoregions of North Western Ghats montane rain forests and North Western Ghats moist deciduous forests, both of which are deemed endangered by the World Wide Fund for Nature (WWF). The forests have high biodiversity.

Some common trees and plants here include: bintangur, Calophyllum apetalum, Malabar tamarind, Garcinia morella, Knema attenuata, Hopea ponga, Tetrameles nudiflora, blackboard tree, Flacourtia montana, Machilus macranthus, Carallia brachiata, aini-maram, Artocarpus lacucha, true cinnamon, bamboo, bauhinia, eucalyptus, lantana, silver oak, teak and jamba.

== Fauna ==
The black panther, elephants and tigers live in the park but are rarely seen. Other large mammals here are Indian bison, sloth bear, Indian wild boar, bonnet macaque, northern plains grey langur, grey slender loris, several deer including: barking deer (muntjac), mouse deer (chevrotain), sambar deer and spotted deer (chital or axis deer).

Wild dog, jackal, jungle cat, leopard cat, small Indian civet, Indian grey mongoose, flying squirrel, porcupine, Malabar civet, Indian giant squirrel and pangolin also make their home in the forests here.

Reptiles in the park include the king cobra, spectacled cobra, Russell's viper, saw-scaled viper, common krait, Indian rock python, rat snake, vine snake, green or bamboo pit viper and monitor lizards.

Interesting birds include the great hornbill, Malabar pied hornbill, Malabar grey hornbill, Indian grey hornbill and Asian fairy bluebird. Around 200 species of birds are recorded in the park. These include the distinctive adjutant stork, ashy woodswallow, brahminy kite, crested serpent eagle, great hornbill, golden-backed woodpecker, Malabar pied hornbill, Sri Lanka frogmouth and yellow-footed green pigeon.

== Visitor information ==
The best months to visit are October to May. The park is open from 6:00 am to 6:00 pm. The nature camp at Kulgi has accommodations available in tents (two beds each), deluxe tents (two beds each), and a dormitory with 16 beds. The climate is quite humid year around. The usual plans are visiting the Bird Trail, Mammal trail in Kulgi which is a 3-km walk. The water sports like Jacuzzi, boating, rafting, and canoeing can be planned in the river Kali, and trekking the extremely beautiful Dudhsagar waterfalls by a 20-km trek is also available. Also note many roads within Anshi national park ( Kali Tiger Reserve )are closed to vehicular traffic from evening 6 P.M to morning 6 A.M like Kulgi to Bhagavathi via Ambikanagar, Anmod to Hemmadaga and Ulavi to Potoli. Also many dams are built across river Kali which criss crosses within tiger reserve. Signboards are written in Kannada the state language and English.

Dandeli is the nearby town adjoining sanctuaries which has daily bus services to Dharwad, Hubballi, Belagavi and Bengaluru.Visiting the eco interests in Goa is optional. The local vegetarian food is served.
