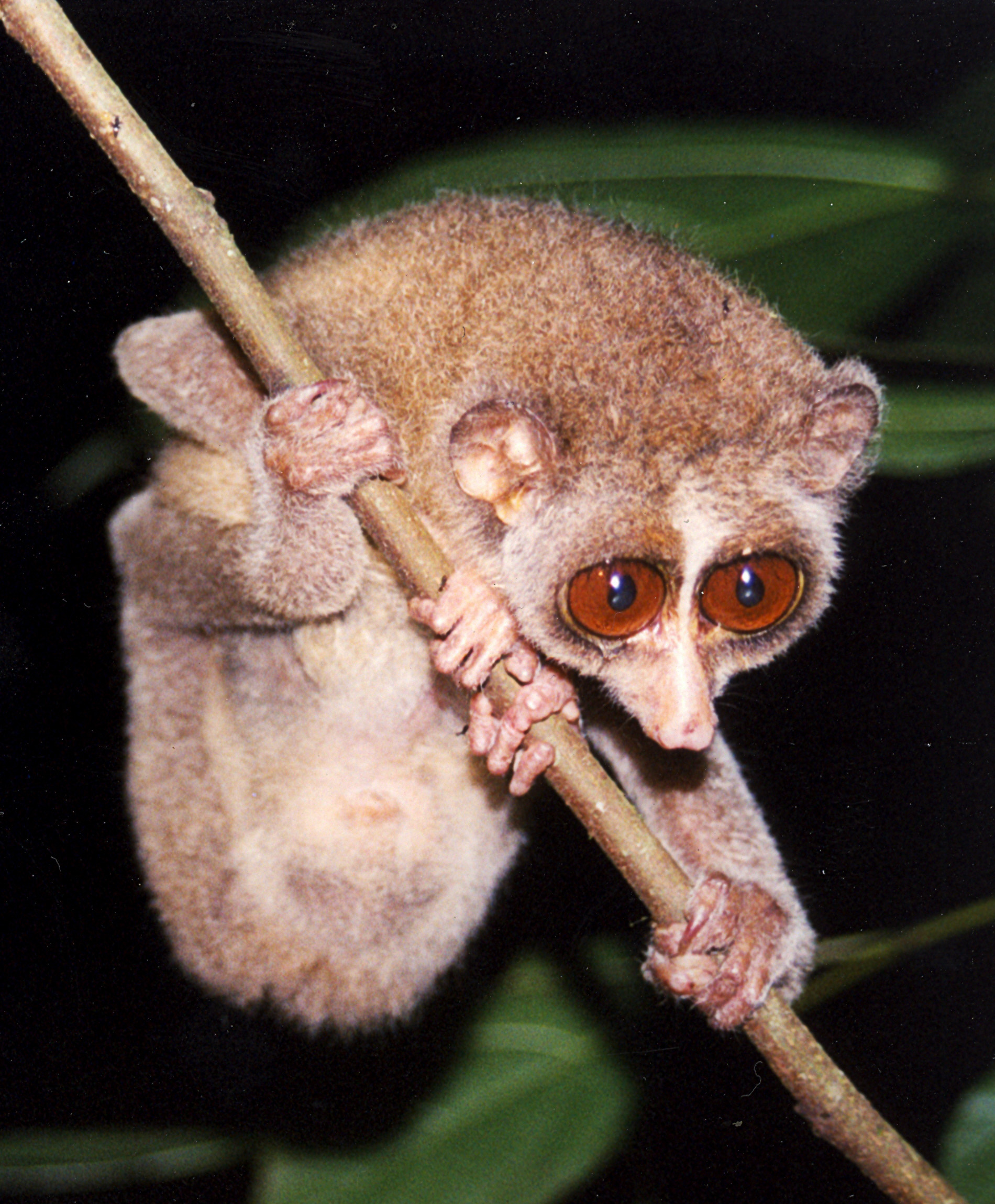

Conservation status
- Endangered (IUCN 3.1)

Scientific classification
- Kingdom: Animalia
- Phylum: Chordata
- Class: Mammalia
- Order: Primates
- Suborder: Strepsirrhini
- Family: Lorisidae
- Genus: Loris
- Species: L. tardigradus

Binomial name
- Loris tardigradus (Linnaeus, 1758)

Subspecies
- L. tardigradus nycticeboides (Hill, 1942); L. tardigradus tardigradus (L., 1758); L. tardigradus parvus (Hill, 1942)
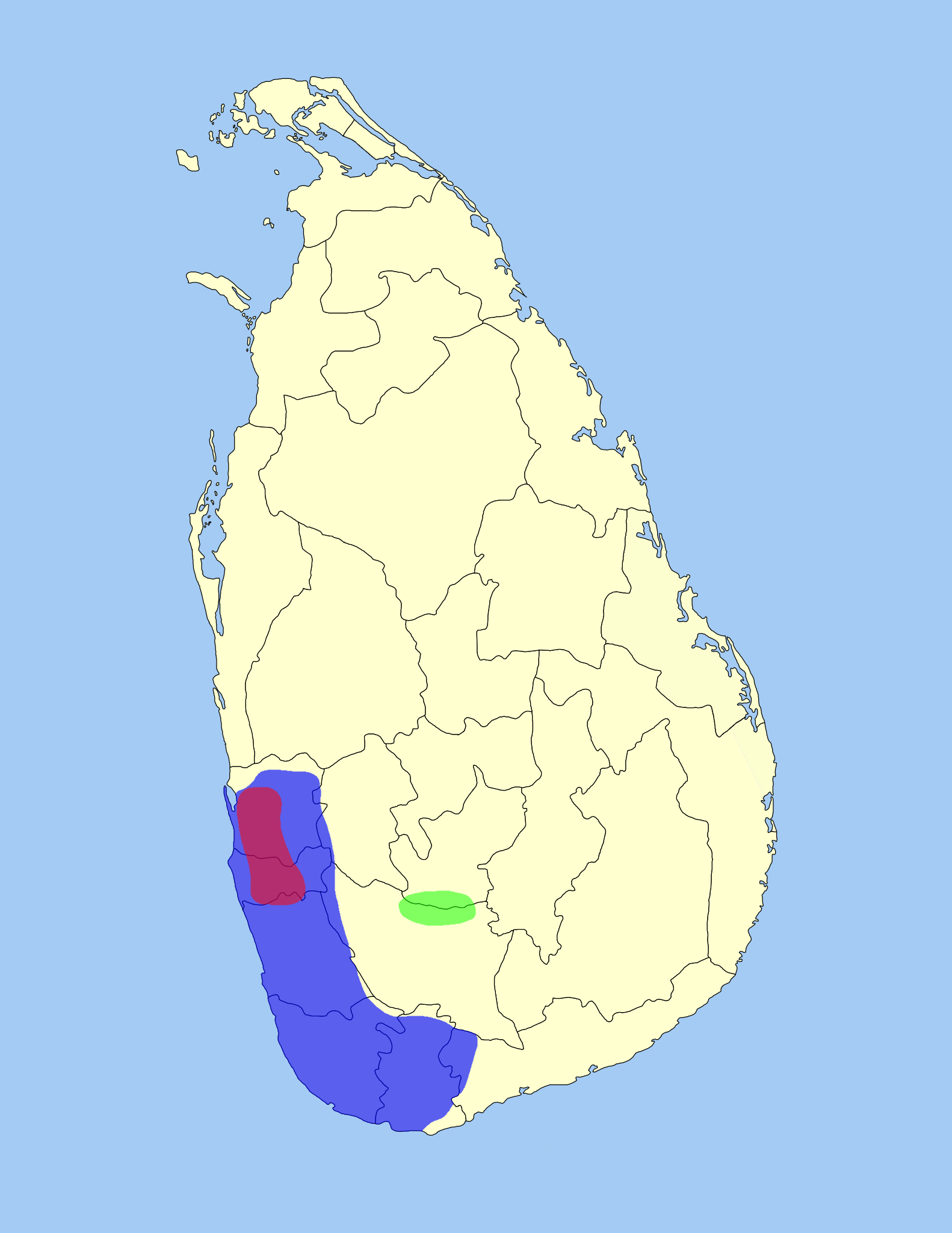
- Southwestern Red Slender Loris Northwestern Red Slender Loris (overlaps with Southwestern Red Slender Loris) Highland Slender Loris

Synonyms
- List: Arachnocebus lori Lesson, 1840; Lemur ceylonicus Fischer, 1804; Lemur tardigradus Linnaeus, 1758; Loris ceylonicus Fischer, 1804; Loris gracilis subsp. zeylanicus Lydekker, 1905; Loris gracilis É.Geoffroy Saint-Hilaire, 1796; Loris lydekkerianus subsp. nycticeboides Hill, 1942; Loris tardigradus subsp. nyctoceboides Hill, 1942; Loris zeylanicus Lydekker, 1905; Nycticebus tardigradus (Linnaeus, 1758); Stenops gracilis (Geoffroy, 1796); Stenops tardigradus (Linnaeus, 1758); Tardigradus loris Boddaert, 1785; Tardigradus tardigradus (Linnaeus, 1758)

= Red slender loris =

Species of primate

The red slender loris (Loris tardigradus) is a small, nocturnal strephsirrhine primate native to the rainforests of Sri Lanka. This is No. 6 of the 10 focal species and No. 22 of the 100 EDGE mammal species worldwide considered the most evolutionarily distinct and globally endangered.

== Taxonomy ==
The taxonomy of slender lorises in Sri Lanka has undergone significant revision. Early classifications recognized multiple subspecies. A pivotal review split them into two species: the small, red wet-zone endemic Loris tardigradus and the larger, greyish Loris lydekkerianus found in India and parts of Sri Lanka. Genetic and morphological studies later supported this split.

Recent work refined the classification of the red slender loris, identifying three subspecies based on morphology and geography: L. t. tardigradus, L. t. nycticeboides, and L. t. parvus.

=== Subspecies ===
Three subspecies of this species are recognized:

- Northwestern red slender loris (Loris tardigradus ssp. parvus) – CR – Restricted to the northwestern wet and intermediate zones north of the Kelani River in the Western Province. Localities include Henarathgoda, Meerigama Kanda, Pilikuttuwa, and Horagolla.
- Southwestern red slender loris (Loris tardigradus ssp. tardigradus) – EN – Found in the southwestern wet zone across the Matara, Ratnapura, Kalutara, and Kegalle districts. It occurs in fragmented forests including Sinharaja, Kanneliya, Peak Wilderness Sanctuary, and Yagirala.
- Highland slender loris (Loris tardigradus ssp. nycticeboides) – CR – Confined to high-altitude areas (above approximately 1,500 m or 4,900 feet) in the central highlands. Known sites are Horton Plains, Hakgala, and forests near Nuwara Eliya such as Conical Hill and Kandapola.

== Description ==
This small, slender primate is distinguished by large forward-facing eyes used for precise depth perception, long slender limbs, a well-developed index finger, the absence of tail, and large prominent ears, which are thin, rounded and hairless at the edges. The soft dense fur is reddish-brown color on the back, and the underside is whitish-grey with a sprinkling of silver hair. Its body length on average is 18–25 cm (7–10 in), with an average weight of a mere 85–370 g (3–13 oz). This loris has a four-way grip on each foot. The big toe opposes the other four toes for a pincer-like grip on branches and food. It has a dark face mask with central pale stripe, much like the slow lorises.

L. tardigradus tardigradus is reddish brown in the back and creamy yellow below, while L. tardigradus nycticeboides is dark brown dorsally and very light brown in upperparts.

== Distribution ==
This species is endemic to the rainforests of Sri Lanka. It is typically found in the southwestern wet zone and the adjacent central highlands. Its range spans the wet southwestern region, extending from Colombo through Kalutara, Ratnapura, Kegalle, Galle, and Matara, and possibly into the wetter parts of Hambantota District.

The species has been documented in numerous protected and proposed forest reserves across several provinces. Western Province (Maimbulakanda, Pilikuttuwa, Kalukele, Horagolla, Dikkele, Meerigama Kanda, Labugama Kalatuwawa, Indikada Mukalana, Koskanda, Bodinagala, Yagirala, and Madakada), Southern Province (Oliyagankele, Welihena, Masmullah, Kekanadura, Beraliya Mukalana, Dandeniya-Aparekka, Kanneliya, Polgahakanda, and Kottawa), Sabaragamuwa Province (Sinharaja World Heritage Site, Delwala, Peak Wilderness Sanctuary, Gilimale, Madampe, and Salgala), Central Province (Horton Plains National Park, Kikiliyamana, Hakgala Strict Nature Reserve, and Conical Hill).

== Behavior ==
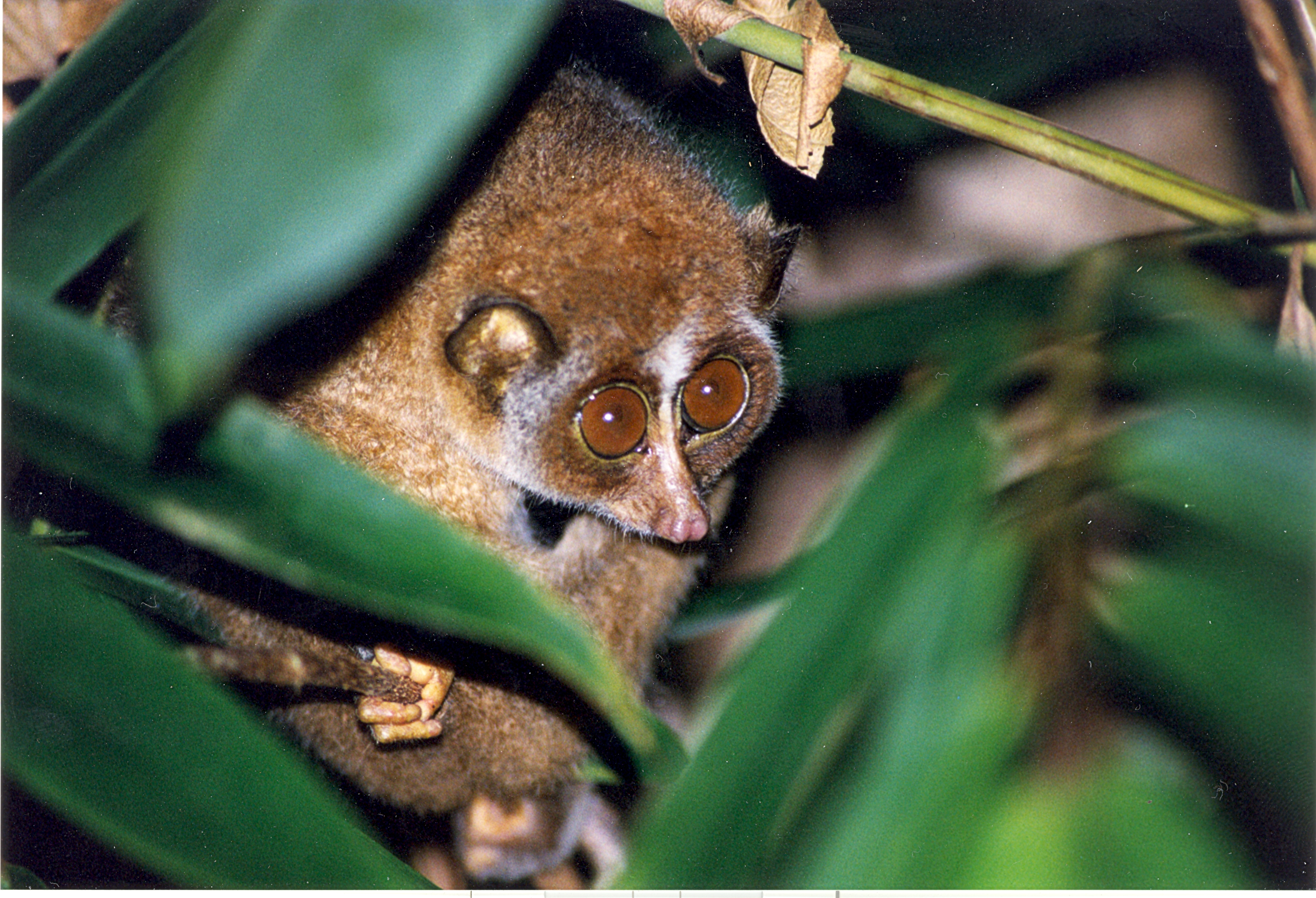
The red slender loris is arboreal.

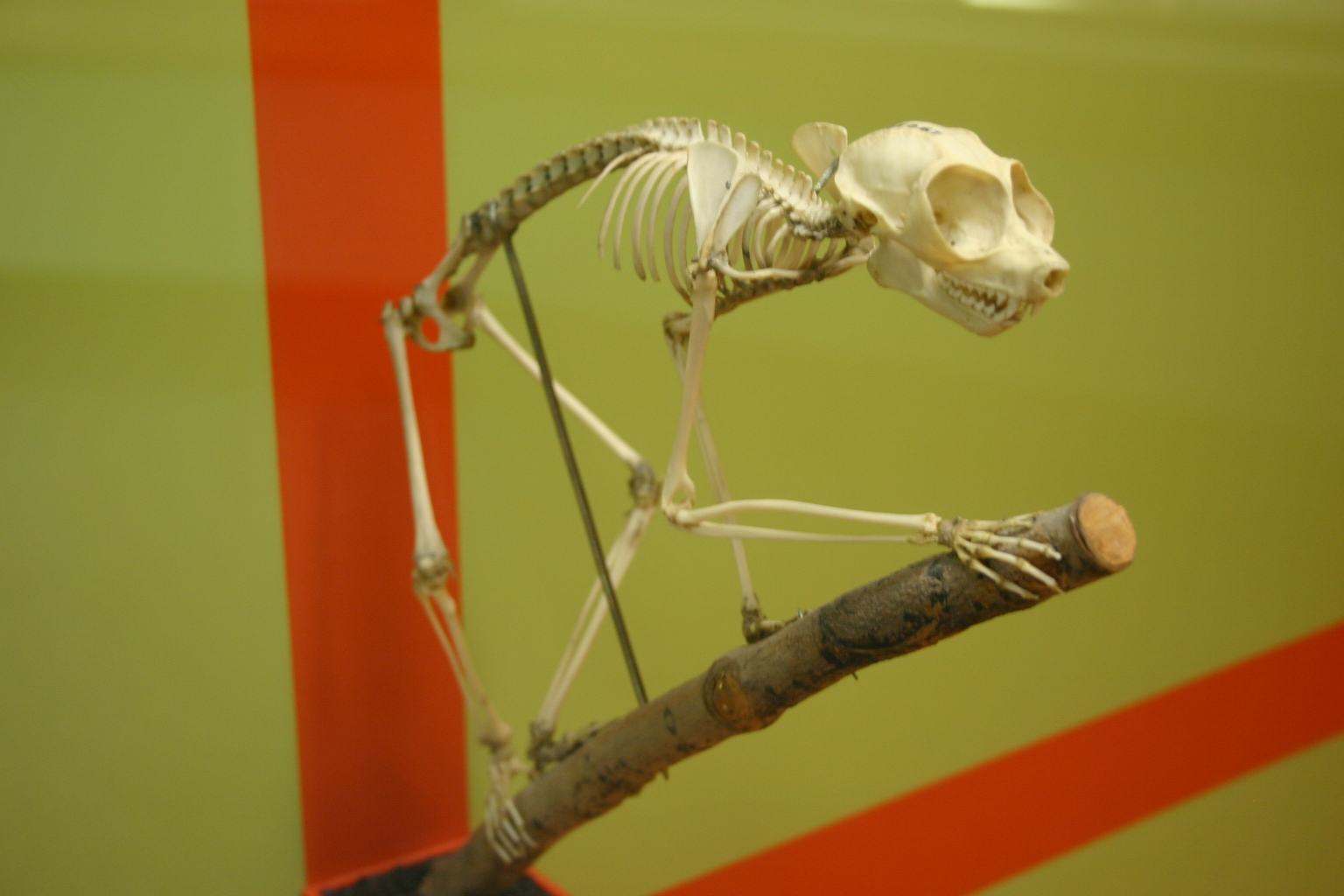
Skeleton of red slender loris

The red slender loris favors lowland rainforests (up to 700 m or 2,300 feet in altitude), tropical rainforests and inter-monsoon forests of the south western wet-zone of Sri Lanka. Masmullah Proposed Forest Reserve harbors one of few remaining red slender loris populations, and is considered a biodiversity hotspot. The most common plant species eaten was Humboldtia laurifolia, occurring at 676 trees/ha, with overall density at 1077 trees/ha. Humboldtia laurifolia is vulnerable and has a mutualistic relationship with ants, providing abundant food for lorises. Reports from the 1960s suggest that it once also occurred in the coastal zone, however it is now thought to be extinct there.

The red slender loris differs from its close relative the gray slender loris in its frequent use of rapid arboreal locomotion. It forms small social groups, containing adults of both sexes as well as young animals. This species is among the most social of the nocturnal primates. During daylight hours the animals sleep in groups in branch tangles, or curled up on a branch with their heads between their legs. The groups also undertake mutual grooming and play at wrestling. The adults typically hunt separately during the night. They are primarily insectivorous but also eat bird eggs, berries, leaves, buds and occasionally invertebrates as well as geckos and lizards. They forage, and while doing so, ants may stick to the back of their hands. As this occurs, the red slender loris is able to consume these ants. To maximize protein and nutrient uptake they consume every part of their prey, including the scales and bones. They make nests out of leaves or find hollows of trees or a similar secure place to live in.

== Reproduction ==
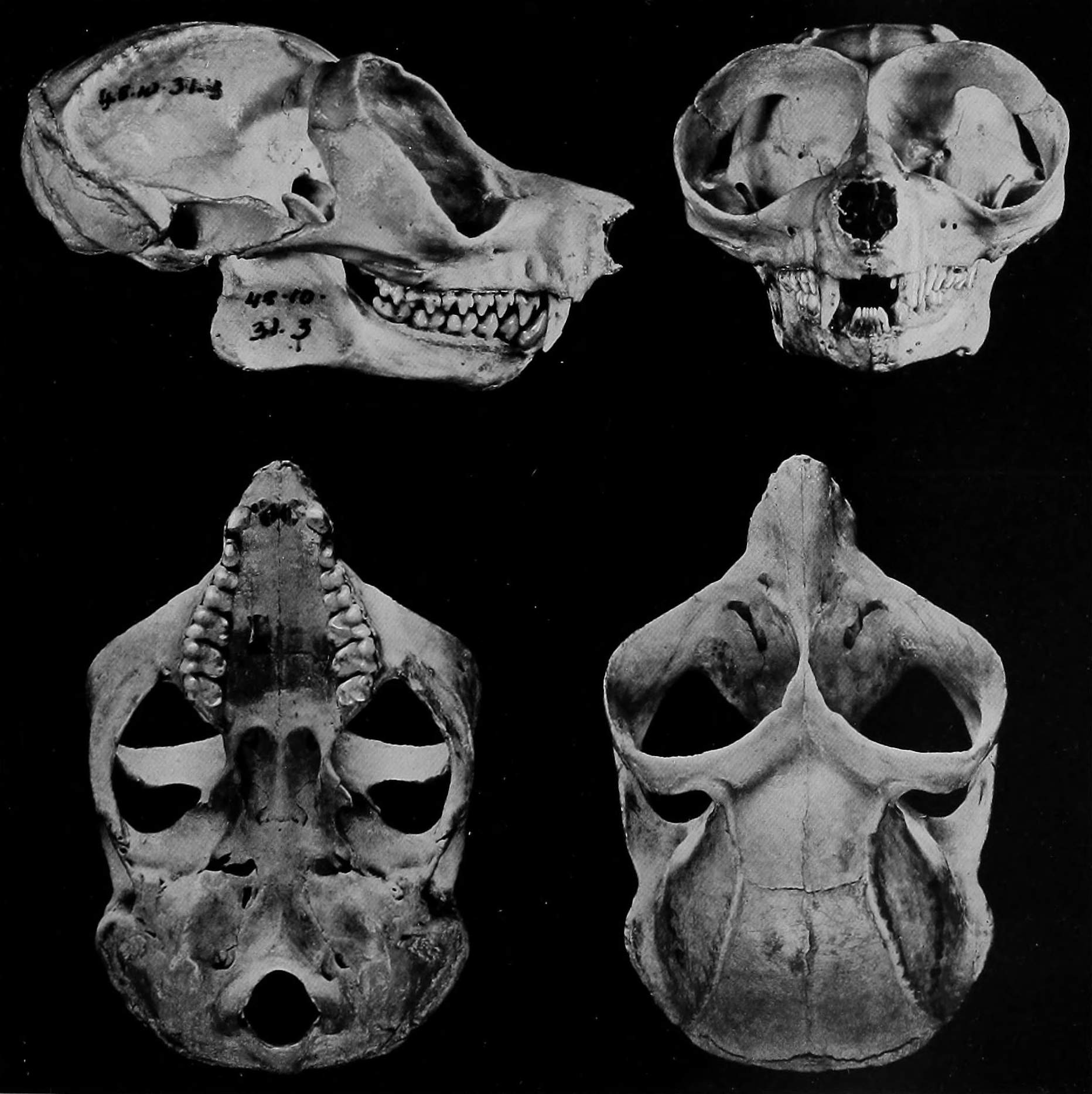
Skull

Females are dominant. The female reaches her sexual maturity at 10 months and is receptive to the male twice a year. This species mates while hanging upside down from branches; individuals in captivity will not breed if no suitable branch is available. The gestation period is 166–169 days, after which the female will bear 1–2 young which feed from her for 6–7 months. The lifespan of this species is believed to be around 15–18 years in the wild.

== Threats ==
This slender loris is an endangered species. Habitat destruction is a major threat. It is widely trapped and killed for use in supposed remedies for eye diseases and is preyed upon by snakes, dogs, and some fish. Other threats include electrocution on live wires, road accidents and capture for the pet trade.

== Conservation ==
The red slender loris was identified as one of the top 10 "focal species" in 2007 by the Evolutionarily Distinct and Globally Endangered (EDGE) project.

One early success has been the rediscovery of the virtually unknown Horton Plains slender loris (Loris tardigradus nycticeboides). Originally documented in 1937, there have been only four known encounters in the past 72 years, and for more than 60 years until 2002 the sub-species had been believed to be extinct. The sub-species was rediscovered in 2002 by a team led by Anna Nekaris in Horton Plains National Park. The late 2009 capture by a team working under the Zoological Society of London's EDGE programme has resulted in the first detailed physical examination of the Horton Plains sub-species and the first-ever photographs of it. The limited available evidence suggests there may be only about 100 animals still existing, which would make it among the top five most-threatened primates worldwide.
