= Dandeli National Park =

National park in the Western Ghats of India

- Interactive map of Dandeli National Park
- Location: Karnataka, India
- Coordinates: 14.99°N 74.36°E

Dandeli National Park is a protected area in the Western Ghats, India.

The park was created in 2007 by merging with the neighboring Anshi Nature Reserve as part of a tiger protection program. Today, they cover an area of about 834 square kilometers. Nature lovers here can enjoy an unforgettable landscape and admire the richness of diversity.

== Flora ==
The forest is mostly evergreen with shades of olive, caused by numerous creepers, wildflowers and shrubs. Some of the plant species that thrive here are: Eucalyptus, Tectona grandis, Grevillea Robusta, T. bellerica, Adina cordifolia, Mitragyna parviflora, Acacia, Xylia xylocarpa and various types of orchids.

== See also ==
- Dandeli Wildlife Sanctuary
