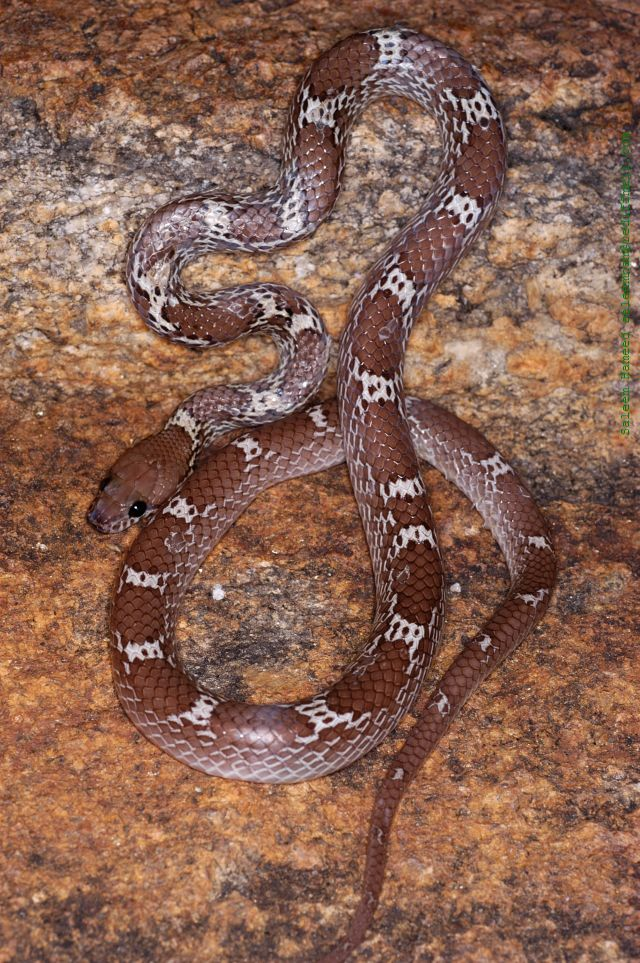

Conservation status
- Least Concern (IUCN 3.1)

Scientific classification
- Kingdom: Animalia
- Phylum: Chordata
- Class: Reptilia
- Order: Squamata
- Suborder: Serpentes
- Family: Colubridae
- Genus: Lycodon
- Species: L. fasciolatus

Binomial name
- Lycodon fasciolatus shaw, 1802

Synonyms
- Lycodon osmanhilli Taylor, 1950 "Lycodon anamallensis" güenther, 1864

= Lycodon anamallensis =

Species of snake

Lycodon anamallensis, also known commonly as the Colombo wolf snake is a species of snake in the family Colubridae. The species is endemic to South India, Bangladesh and Sri Lanka.

== Geographic range ==
L. anamallensis is found in South India and Sri Lanka.

== Behavior and habitat ==
Like all members of its genus, L. anamallensis is a nocturnal species that is commonly found in and around human habitations, apart from natural habitat. It is partly arboreal and feeds primarily on geckos, skinks, & other small animals. It is nonvenomous.

== Reproduction ==
L. anamallensis is oviparous.

== Taxonomy ==
Previously, a population of this species, under the name Lycodon osmanhilli, had been thought to be endemic to Sri Lanka, until 2018 when its nomenclature, classification, and distribution were resolved by S.R. Ganesh and G. Vogel.

== Etymology ==
The specific name, osmanhilli, is in honour of British anatomist William Charles Osman Hill.
