= Dandeli Wildlife Sanctuary =

Wildlife sanctuary in Karnataka, India

- IUCN category IV (habitat/species management area)
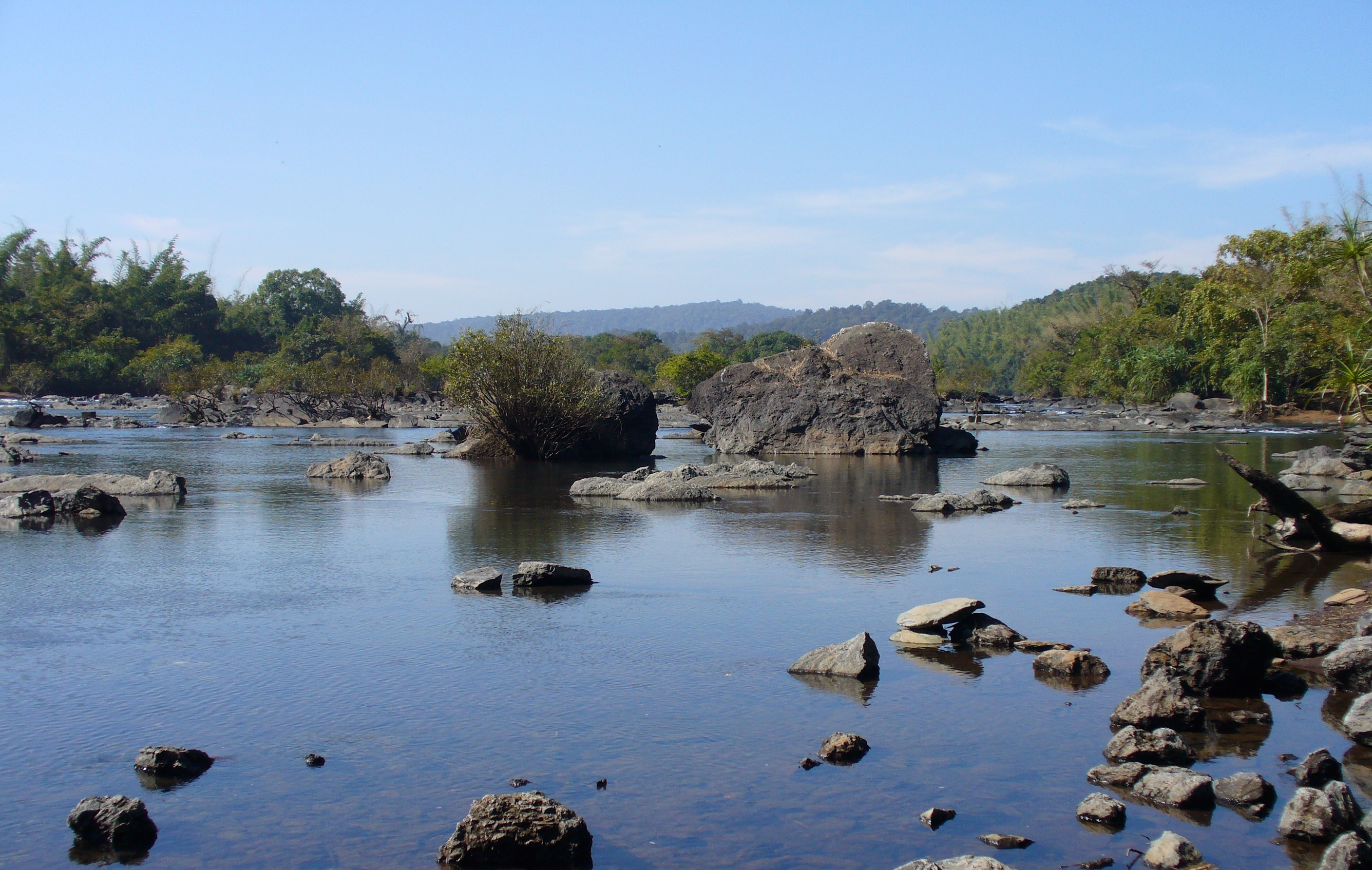
- Kali river in Dandeli Wildlife Sanctuary

- Location within Karnataka Location within India
- Interactive map of Dandeli Wildlife Sanctuary
- Location: Uttara Kannada, Karnataka, India
- Coordinates: 15°30′23″N 74°23′30″E
- Area: 866.41 km^{2} (334.52 sq mi)
- Established: 2015 (as Elephant Reserve)

Dandeli Wildlife Sanctuary is located in Uttara Kannada District of Karnataka state in India. The sanctuary covers an area of 866.41 km^{2} (334.52 sq mi).

Along with neighboring Anshi National Park (339.87 square kilometres (83,980 acres)), the sanctuary was declared part of the Anshi Dandeli Tiger Reserve in 2006. Karnataka state government has officially notified the Dandeli Elephant Reserve under Project Elephant on 4 June 2015. The elephant reserve is spread over 2,321 km^{2} (896 sq mi), including 475 km^{2} (183 sq mi) as core and the remaining as buffer areas. This is the second elephant reserve in Karnataka after Mysuru Elephant Reserve, which was declared in 2002.

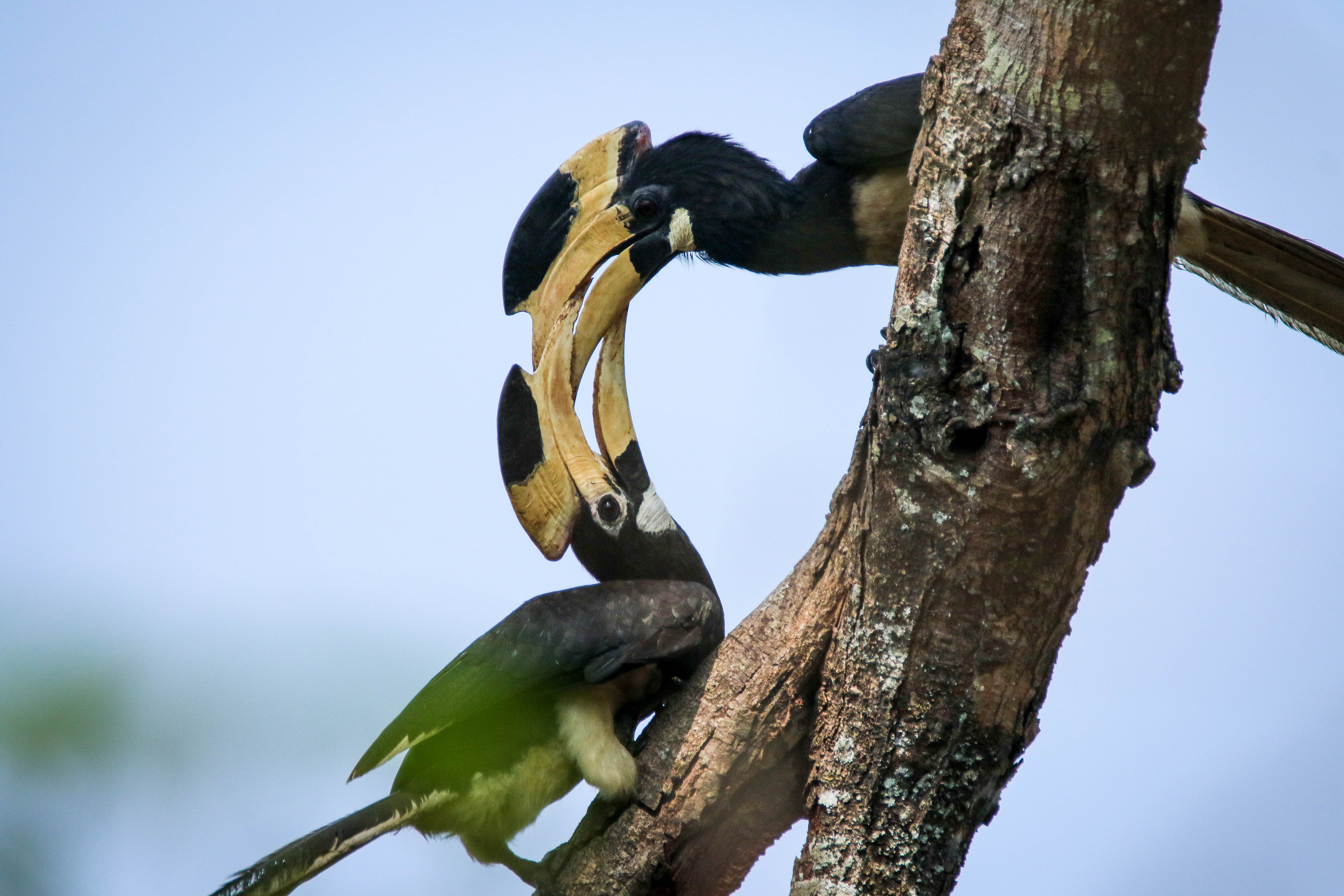
Malabar pied hornbills at Dandeli Wildlife Sanctuary

Dandeli Wildlife Sanctuary is home to nearly 270 bird species, including the great hornbill (great Indian hornbill or great pied hornbill) and the Malabar pied hornbill. It is also the only tiger reserve in India to report frequent sightings of the black panther. It also features the Indian sloth bear, the Indian pangolin, the giant Malabar squirrel, dhole, the Indian jackal and the muntjac (barking deer). Sightings of the Indian elephant and the Indian peafowl are pretty common. The king cobra and the mugger crocodile (Indian crocodile) are the prime reptilians in Dandeli Wildlife Sanctuary.

The forests in Dandeli are a mixture of dense deciduous trees interspersed with bamboo and teak plantations.

== See also ==
- Dandeli National Park Flora
