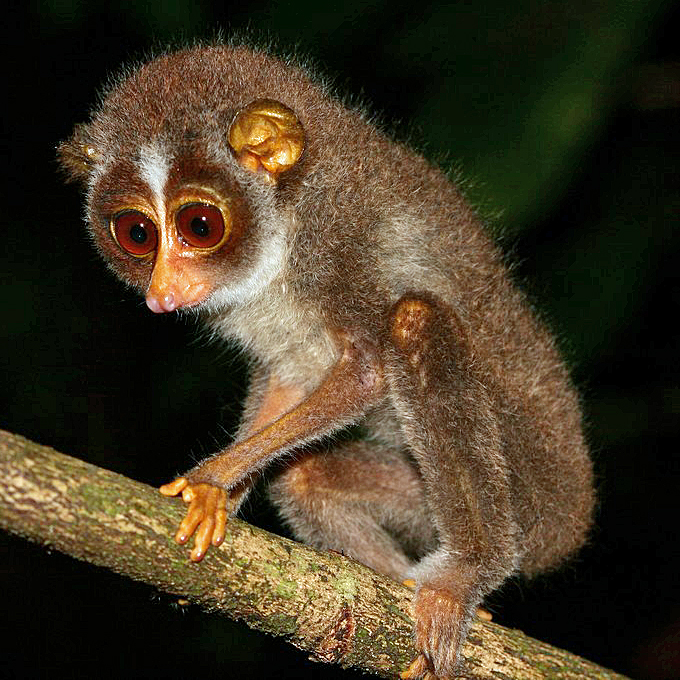
- Red slender loris (Loris tardigradus)

Conservation status
- CITES Appendix II

Scientific classification
- Kingdom: Animalia
- Phylum: Chordata
- Class: Mammalia
- Order: Primates
- Suborder: Strepsirrhini
- Family: Lorisidae
- Subfamily: Lorinae
- Genus: Loris; É. Geoffroy, 1796

Type species
- Lemur tardigradus Linnaeus, 1758

Species
- L. tardigradus; L. lydekkerianus
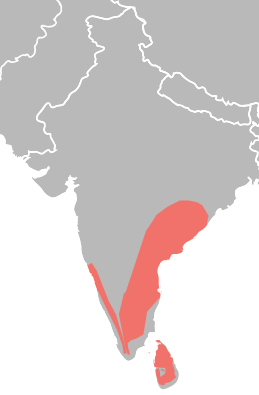
- Loris distribution

Synonyms
- Arachnocebus Lesson, 1840; Stenops Illiger, 1811; Tardigradus Boddaert, 1785

= Slender loris =

Slender lorises

Genus of primates

The slender lorises (Loris) are two species of loris endemic to India and Sri Lanka that comprise the genus Loris. They are small, lithe strepsirrhine primates that weigh between 85 and 340 grams (3.0 and 12.0 oz), with the gray slender loris (L. lydekkerianus) being larger than the insular red slender loris (L. tardigradus). Slender lorises are arboreal, nocturnal animals that forage by themselves at night and congregate into gregarious groups to sleep during the day. Mothers will leave their infants alone during the night, a behaviour known as "parking", while they forage. Slender lorises maintain predominantly carnivorous diets consisting of invertebrates such as spiders, orthopterans, snails, and ants, as well as vertebrates such as lizards and frogs. Between the two slender loris species are seven recognised subspecies, each of which has unique traits such as varying fur colourations and body proportions. The slender lorises have undergone numerous taxonomic revisions since they were first described in the 18th century.

The head of a slender loris is distinguished by the presence of large eyes that lie closer together than any other primate's. The dentition possesses the typical strepsirrhine toothcomb consisting of the flattened lower incisors and canines, which a slender loris can use for grooming itself and others. Accomplishing a similarly hygienic function is a toilet claw of the second toe, which can be used to clean almost any part of the body via the slender loris' remarkable flexibility. Slender lorises have small, pincer-like hands and feet with reduced second fingers that allow an individual to powerfully grip a branch for hours at a time, with the assistance of specialised blood vessels in the limbs known as retia mirabilia. Though otherwise variable, fur patterns are unified by the presence of a thin, vertical white stripe between the eyes, as well as dark patches around the eyes.

The gray slender loris is classified as a near threatened species by the International Union for Conservation of Nature, while the red slender loris is classified as endangered. Both species are listed under Appendix II by CITES. Slender lorises are threatened by poaching for the acquisition of body parts for use in traditional medicine, as well as habitat loss.

== Etymology ==
The Comte de Buffon was the first scientific authority to identify the slender lorises with the term "loris" in the 13th volume of his Histoire Naturelle, which he adopted from Dutch traders' name for the animals, loeris, meaning "clown". This moniker could have been descriptive of the slender lorises' apparent acrobatic capabilities or of the clown-like markings on their faces. In English, the slender lorises were alternatively known as the "Ceylon sloths".

In India, slender lorises are called devanga-pilli or arawe-papa in Telugu, kaadu-paapa in Kannada, kaada naramani in Tulu, and lāzāḷū-mākaḍ in Marathi. In Tamil they are known as kada papa, meaning "baby of the forest", or theivangu, meaning "the slender-bodied one". In Sri Lanka, they are known as unahapuluwa in Sinhala, which is also a term for an emaciated person. Alternatively, they are called nama-thevangu in Sinhala, which compares the white vertical mark on slender lorises' foreheads to those worn by worshippers of Vishnu called namam.

== Taxonomy ==
There are two valid species of slow loris:

Genus Loris – É Geoffroy, 1796 – two species
Common name	Scientific name and subspecies	Range	Size and ecology	IUCN status and estimated population
Gray slender loris	L. lydekkerianus A. Cabrera, 1908 Four subspecies: L. l. grandis (Highland gray slender loris); L. l. lydekkerianus (Mysore slender loris); L. l. malabaricus (Malabar slender loris); L. l. nordicus (Northern Ceylonese slender loris)	Southern India and Sri Lanka	Size: 18–26.3 cm (7–10 in) long Habitat: Forest Diet: Insects, occasionlly mollusks and small vertebrates	NT Unknown
Red slender loris	L. tardigradus (Linnaeus, 1758) Three subspecies: L. t. nycticeboides (Highland red slender loris); L. t. parvus (Northwestern red slender loris); L. t. tardigradus (Southwestern red slender loris)	Sri Lanka	Size: 20.32–25.4 cm (8–10 in) long Habitat: Forest Diet: Insects and reptiles, occasionally leaves, flowers, and plant gum	EN 2000–2300

=== Changes in taxonomy ===
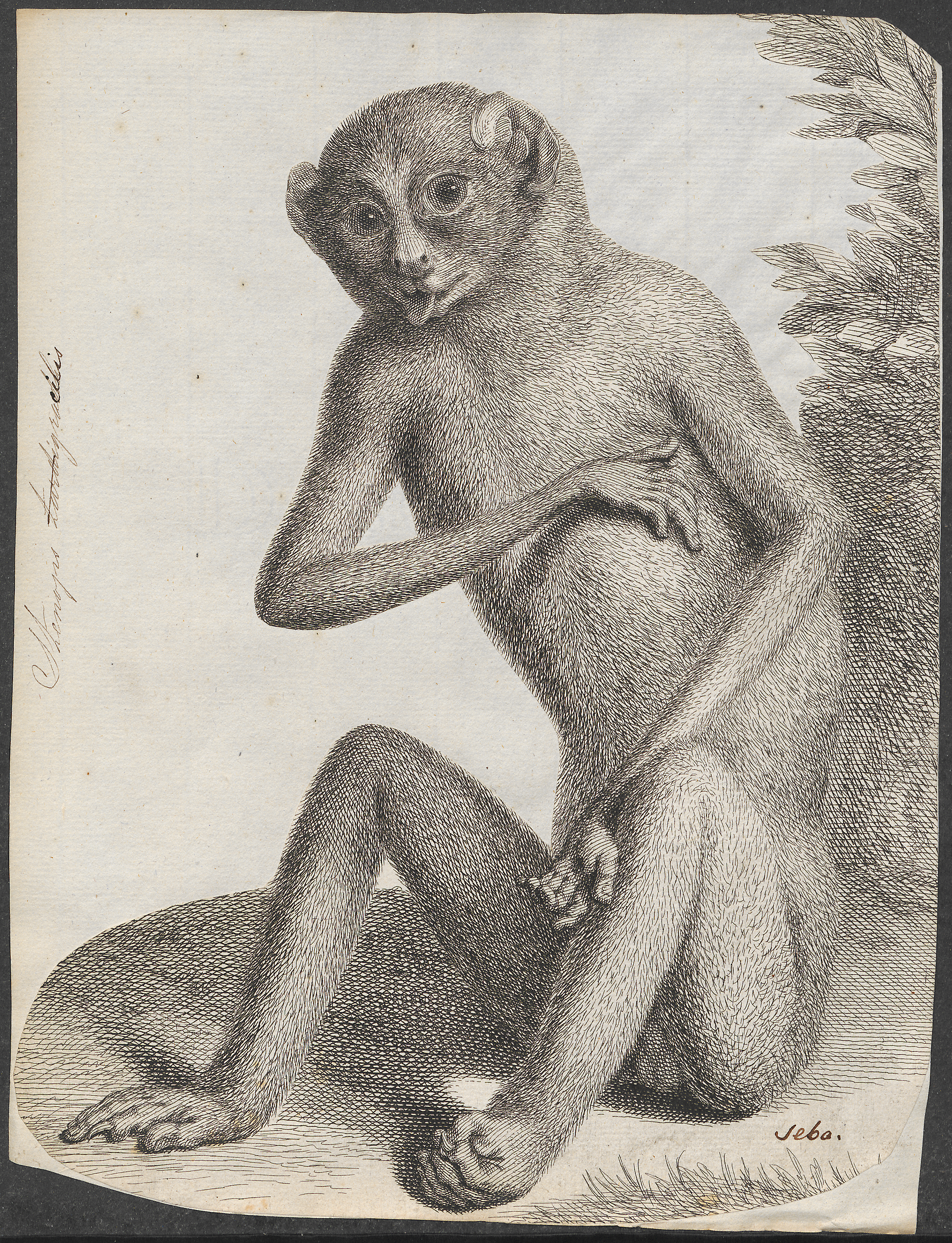
An illustration of the red slender loris by Albertus Seba

Early descriptions of lorises are often unclear as to which genus was under study, owing to the fact that both slender and slow lorises were introduced to European scientists by Dutch voyagers returning from Sri Lanka and the East Indies at around the same time. Carl Linnaeus described slender lorises as Lemur tardigradus in the 1758 10th edition of Systema Naturae. Although the red slender loris was once part of Lemur, the term "lemur" has since been applied to lemuroids to the exclusion of other strepsirrhines. The specific name tardigradus was adopted from Albertus Seba's illustrations of the red slender loris, so named because it reminded him of sloths, then classified as Tardigrada. Arnout Vosmaer reiterated the sloth-like characteristics of lorises in a 1770 hypothesis, which provoked a rebuttal from the Comte de Buffon, who disproved Vosmaer's sloth hypothesis by presenting the slender lorises' primate-like traits in the posthumous 36th volume of his Histoire Naturelle.

The first author to elevate slender lorises to generic status and separate the slow and slender lorises into different species was Pieter Boddaert in 1784, but his generic name for slender lorises, Tardigradus, was preoccupied. As a result, taxonomic priority belongs to Loris, which was erected in 1796 by Étienne Geoffroy Saint-Hilaire for the red slender loris, which he named Loris gracilis, in the Magasin encyclopédique. Gotthelf Fischer von Waldheim (Loris ceylonicus in 1804), Johann Karl Wilhelm Illiger (Stenops in 1811), and René Lesson (Arachnocebus lori in 1840) each authored competing descriptions of slender lorises throughout the 19th century. In 1905, Richard Lydekker established the first definitive taxonomic distinction between the red and gray slender lorises. Believing that Geoffroy had described gray slender lorises in 1796, Lydekker described the red slender loris as L. g. zeylanicus. Ángel Cabrera attempted to correct Lydekker's error in 1908 by describing the gray slender loris as L. lori lydekkerianus.

In 1913, Kathleen V. Ryley published a revision of the entire Loris genus which merged all then-extant Sri Lankan taxa into a single species, L. tardigradus, thereby returning to the Linnaean specific name. Her revision also elevated Cabrera's L. l. lydekkerianus subspecies to a species in its own right, which she named the Mysore slender loris (L. lydekkerianus). Robert Charles Wroughton later described the Malabar slender loris (L. malabaricus) as its own species on account of its small size and unique fur. In 1932, the slender lorises of Sri Lanka that had been described by Ryley were divided into two subspecies by William Charles Osman Hill and William Watt Addison Phillips, L. t. tardigradus and the new Ceylon highland slender loris (L. t. grandis). The following year, Hill described the northern form of the Sri Lankan gray slender loris as the northern Ceylonese slender loris (L. t. nordicus). At the time, Hill argued the necessity of revising the entire genus, as L. t. nordicus appeared to occupy an intermediate position between all then-known forms of slender lorises. As such, he described the slender lorises as a single species, L. tardigradus, with five different subspecies. He then described a sixth subspecies, L. t. nyctibceboides, in 1942.

Colin Groves revised Hill's monospecific taxonomy in 1998, separating the red and grey slender lorises into the two different species accepted today. A final subspecies, the northwestern red slender loris (L. t. parvus), was described by Saman Gamage and colleagues in 2017, who suggested that its morphological differences from the southwestern red slender loris may qualify it as an independent species, given further examination.

== Anatomy and physiology ==
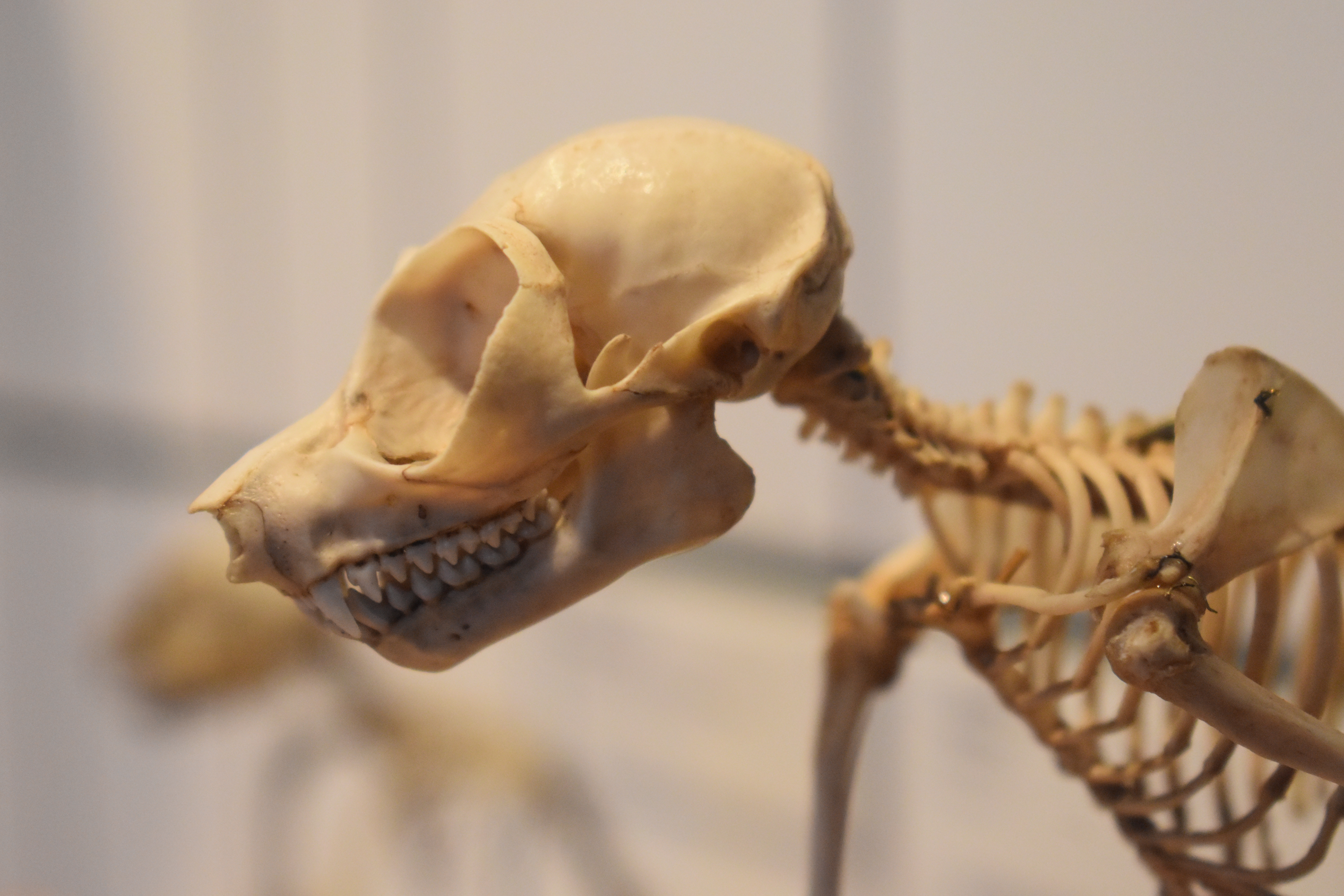
Skull of a red slender loris

The slender lorises are small primates that are characterised by their extreme litheness and highly specialised traits. They can be distinguished from other lorisids by their lithe shape, enlarged eye sockets, and short, pointed snouts. Females are generally larger than males. The gray slender loris, which can reach a maximum weight of 340 grams (12 oz), is much heavier than the red slender loris, as infant gray slender loris are about the same weight as adult red slender lorises, which can be as light as 85 g (3.0 oz). The head appears spherical and the coronal suture between the two parietal bones of the skull is often asymmetrical. Unlike some other strepsirrhine primates such as galagos, there is no supraorbital notch above the eye sockets. The snout is elongated beyond the tooth row due to the large size of the premaxillae. The skull exhibits post-orbital constriction as a result of a reduced distance between the eyes, which is the lowest among all primates. The resultant overlapping visual fields of the two forward-pointed eyes creates a sophisticated stereoscopic vision (three-dimensional sight). The dental formula is 2.1.3.32.1.3.3 × 2 = 36, meaning that slender lorises have four incisors, two canines, six premolars, and six molars in each half of the mouth. The dentition is characterised by the presence of a dental structure known as a toothcomb, as well as a caniniform lower front premolar (P_{2}). In the toothcomb, the lower incisors (I_{1–2}) are tilted forward and are flattened laterally. The lower canine (C_{−}) is incisiform and also participates in the composition of the toothcomb. Because the canine is occupied by the toothcomb, the lower front premolar adopts the shape and function of the lower canine in the mouth. The upper incisors (I^{1–2}) are reduced in size due to a lack of collision with the lower incisors, and the inner pair are separated by a gap that allows the upper lip to attach to the gum. Compared to the slow lorises, the foramen magnum is positioned further forward in the skull. Slender lorises differ from all other lorisids in that their heads are not pointed in a downward direction.

Slender lorises are very flexible.

The limbs are long and narrow, with the arms having enlarged olecranons (bony processes at the upper ends of the ulnae bones). The intermembral index is 93, as the legs are slightly longer than the arms. The shoulders and hips permit great flexibility in the arms and legs; the hindlimbs are capable of a greater range of motion in all directions than that which is seen in simians, such that almost the entire body is accessible by a slender loris' own toe. As is the case with other lorises and angwantibos, slender lorises do not have visible tails. The hands and feet are robust; both the second finger and second toe are reduced in size, which allows for efficient grasping of thin branches. This grasping behaviour is further supported by the presence of retia mirabilia in the blood vessels of the limbs, which allow a slender loris to sustain a continuous grasp for hours at a time. This grip is so strong that it can be difficult to dislodge a slender loris from its position once it has grasped a branch. The fourth finger is the longest in the hand, which increases the breadth of a slender loris' grasp by being positioned opposite the thumb. The thumb is not truly opposable, as it cannot make direct contact with the pads of the fingertips on the same hand. The second toe possesses a grooming claw, which is typical of strepsirrhine primates; this is not a true claw, as it is instead a broad, compressed nail that is used for grooming and scratching, which is especially important for hygienic purposes because the other nails do not extend beyond the tips of the fingers. The digital formula is 4>3>5>2>1, meaning that the fourth finger is the longest, while the first is the shortest. The papillary ridges on the hands and fingers are prominent, especially on the hands of the forelimbs. The slender lorises have elongated spinal columns that allow their spines to sway from side-to-side in a snake-like manner during arboreal movement. The spine is composed of seven cervical vertebrae, 14–15 thoracic vertebrae, eight or nine lumbar vertebrae, three sacral vertebrae, and five caudal vertebrae. The lumbar vertebrae are elongated about the central axis of the spine, and the final five or six vertebrae are fused to form the coccyx. 14–15 pairs of ribs are present.

The brain weighs between 4.5 and 8 g (0.16 and 0.28 oz), and is notable for lacking a central sulcus in the cerebral cortex. The slender lorises have chestnut-coloured eyes that possess a reflective membranes known as tapeta lucida, which is trait typical of strepsirrhine primates. The retina contains narrow rods and lacks cones altogether, which are traits that are associated with nocturnality. Dark patches surround the eye sockets, and a white stripe runs vertically between the eyes. The slender lorises' lithe appearances are partially resultant of their thinner, sparser fur compared to the thicker coats of slow lorises. The stomach is simple and spherical in shape, and the caecum lacks indentations. Anatomists such as Anton Nuhn have described the slender lorises as possessing a veriform appendix, whereas Paul Broca considered the same mass to be part of the caecum. The large intestine is arranged such that it is coiled into corkscrew-shaped spirals known as ansa coli. The male's scrotum changes colour during rut, wherein it adopts a spotted pattern. Females' genitalia swell during oestrus.

=== Variation ===
Face of a Malabar slender loris

The colour of fur varies between species and subspecies. Climatic factors may influence the distribution of colourations, as taxa found in wetter climates tend to be redder, whereas those found in drier climates are darker and are sometimes accompanied by a pale frosting atop the fur. The smallest slender loris subspecies is L. t. tardigradus, which weighs between 85 and 113 g (3.0 and 4.0 oz). The adult male is uniformly russet-coloured, and has a faint or absent stripe along the middle of the back. The female is wood-brown with frosting on the lumbar area. On the front of the torso, L. t. tardigradus is buff to yellow-coloured. L. t. parvus weighs between 123 and 170 g (4.3 and 6.0 oz), and has a dark, golden-brown colouration with short fur. L. t. nycticeboides is short-limbed and heavily coated with earth-brown fur on the back that is paler over the loins and hindlimbs, and lacks frosting. It is ochre on the front of the body. On the face, the stripe between the eyes is splint into two at the top. The size of this subspecies is between that of L. t. tardigradus and L. l. grandis, and its robust shape resembles those of the slow lorises. L. l. grandis weighs between 155 and 198 g (5.5 and 7.0 oz), and is dark grey to brownish grey on the back, while being pure white on the front, with heavy frosting over the loin area. Females and immature individuals are darker than adult males, and the extremities are more fully-coated than most other subspecies. L. l. malabaricus weighs about 170 g (6.0 oz). It is russet to wood-brown on the back, while it is dirty white or buff on the front. The stripe along the back is either faint or absent. L. l. nordicus is about 240 g (8.5 oz), and is ash grey and heavily frosted on the back surface and white on the frontal aspect. The stripe along the middle of the back connects to a dark patch on the crown of the head. L. l. lydekkerianus is the largest slender loris, weighing between 283 and 340 g (10.0 and 12.0 oz), and resembling L. l. nordicus except for its lack of grey hair bases in the frontal fur.

== Distribution and habitat ==
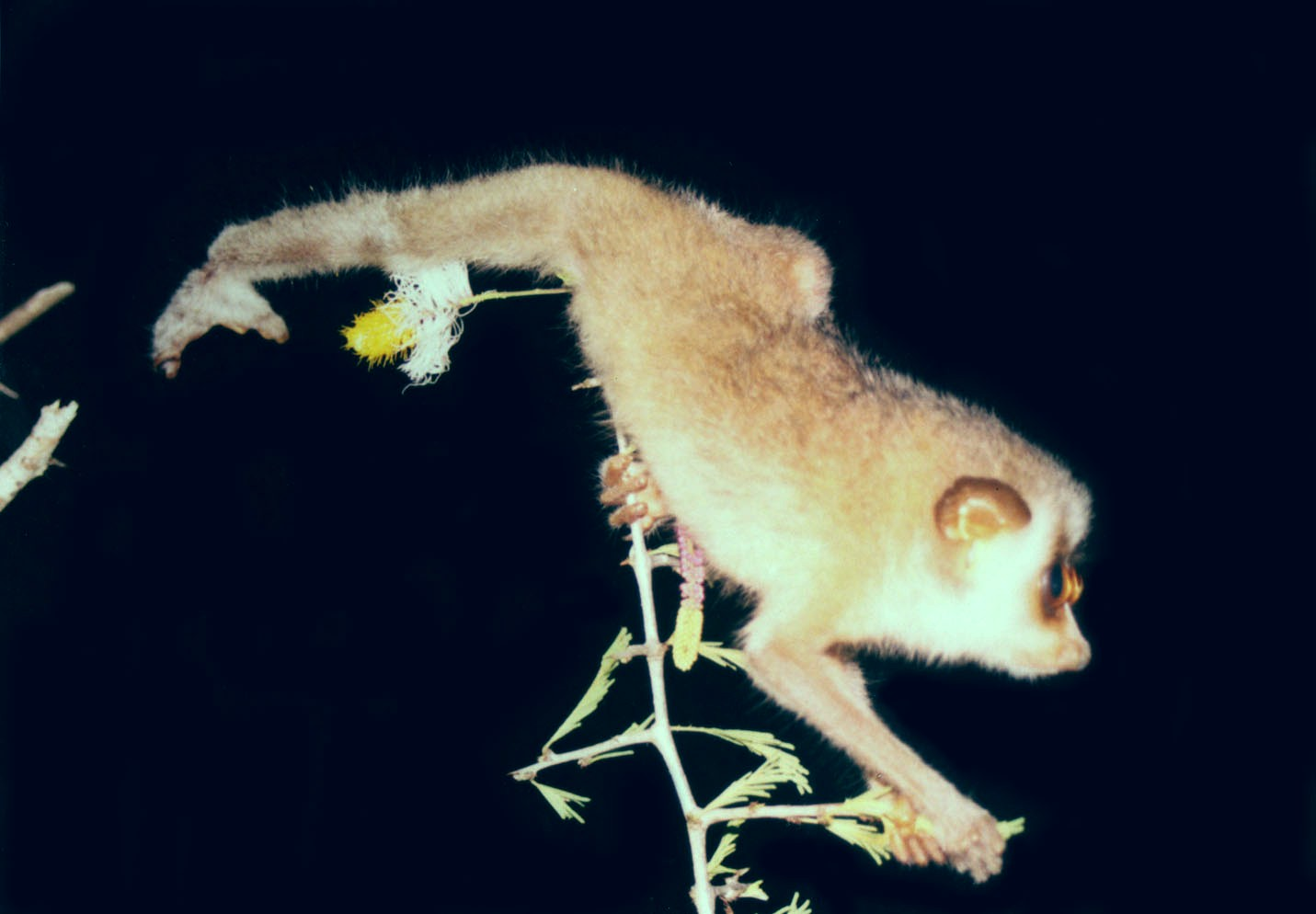
Slender lorises use thin substrates in undergrowth and secondary forests to travel.

The red slender loris is only found in Sri Lanka, while the gray slender loris occurs in both Sri Lanka and India. Two of the subspecies of red slender loris differ in their habitat preference; the southwestern red slender loris favours wet lowland forests (up to 470 m (1,540 ft) above sea level) in the south western wet-zone of Sri Lanka, whereas the highland red slender loris prefers cloud, montane, and highland evergreen forests at elevations of 1,800–2,300 m (5,900–7,500 ft). The gray slender loris can be found in tropical rainforests, coastal acacia scrub forests, semi-evergreen forests, swamps, and bamboo groves up to 2,000 m (6,600 ft) above sea level.

The average population density of slender lorises is about 2.4 lorises/km^{2}, which varies between habitats. The population density in dry habitats is 3.85 lorises/km^{2}. It is 1.21 lorises/km^{2} in wet habitats, 0.45 lorises/km^{2} in intermediate habitats, and 0.49 lorises/km^{2} in montane habitats. Slender lorises are found at an average height of 3.0 to 3.4 metres (9.8 to 11.2 ft) above the ground. Both species occur more frequently in unprotected forests than in protected forests, and are most commonly found in undergrowth and secondary forests, where preferred substrates (surfaces upon which an animal moves) are readily available for travel. Dry forest forms tend to fare better in close proximity to humans than wet forest forms; the dry forest-dwelling gray slender loris can even be found in home gardens. Additionally, the distribution of gray slender lorises is correlated with the availability of horizontal substrates such as man-made fences, whereas red slender lorises prefer vertical substrates such as vines. This could explain the absence of slender lorises in the southeast of Sri Lanka, which consists of dry forests with few horizontal substrates. Slender loris distributions and group size variations are also associated with the availability of preferred food items such as ants and orthopterans.

== Behaviour ==
=== Posture and movement ===
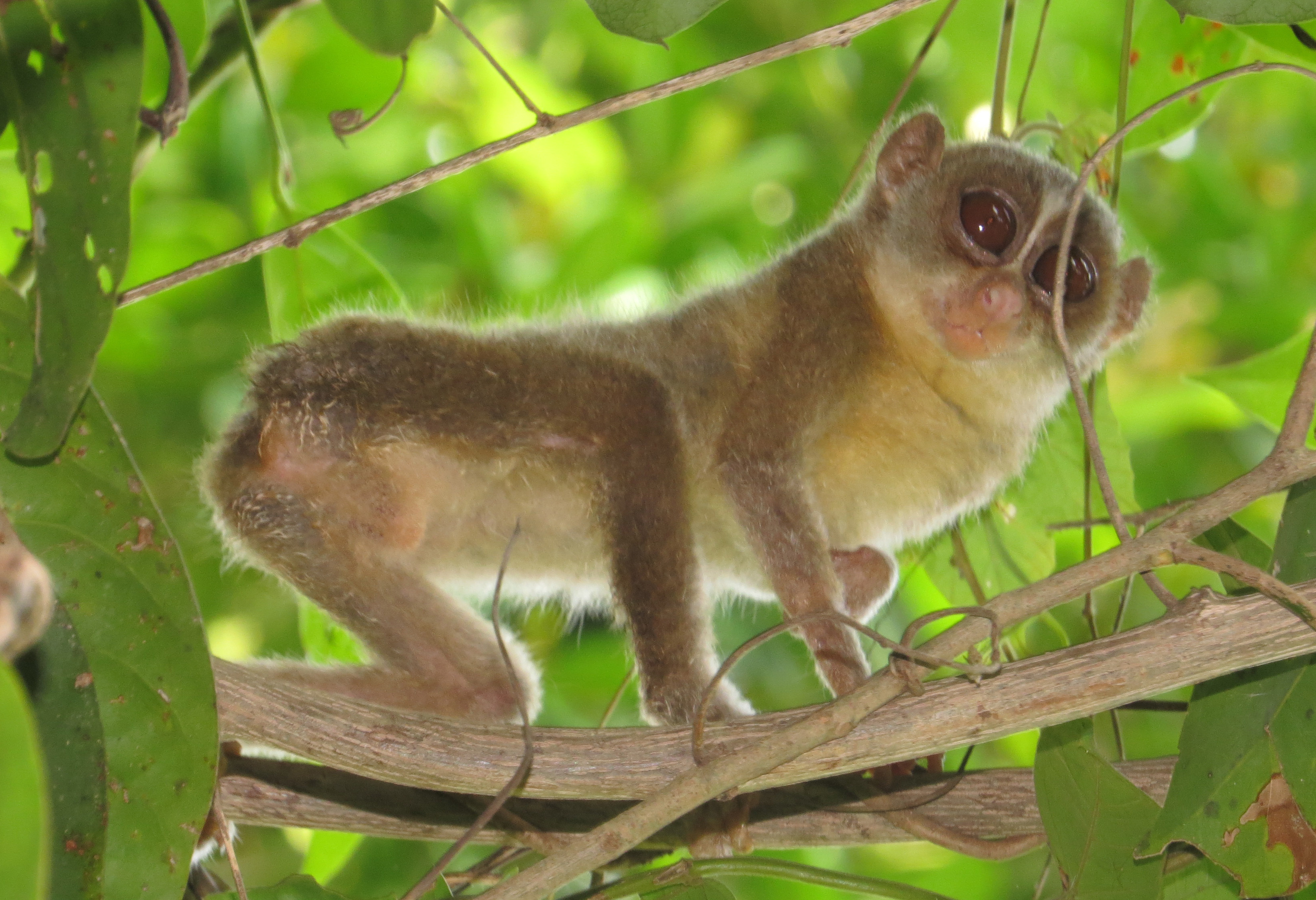
Gray slender loris atop a branch

The slender lorises are highly specialised animals, partially as a result of their inability to jump combined with their obligatorily arboreal method of movement. Because they cannot leap, slender lorises span gaps in their substrates using bridging postures. Although they are more efficient with clinging to and moving across thin substrates that can fit within their small, pincer-like hands and feet, they are also able to scale thick tree trunks if necessary. Throughout a night, a slender loris will travel about 1 kilometre (0.62 mi). Red slender lorises exhibit quicker movements than gray slender lorises, and utilise smaller substrates for travel as a result of their reduced size. Male slender lorises generally travel more than females.

During sleep and rest, a slender loris rolls into a ball with the head and hands tucked between the thighs while the legs grasp a branch. While the sleep and rest posture is maintained, the torso is stabilised within the fork of two branches. Before this posture is assumed, a leaf is often procured and placed in the fork to cushion the body from the hard surface of the branch, which possibly results from the lack of ischial callosities (calluses on the hindquarters) that are present in many primate species. When frightened, a slender loris will stand up on a branch bipedally with its elbows flexed at the height of the sternum.

=== Social structure ===
Slender lorises can spend up to 50% of their waking hours associating with conspecifics.

The slender lorises spend about 50% of their waking hours close to conspecifics. Female slender lorises generally have home ranges that are exclusive to other females, whereas males' may overlap multiple females'. The home ranges of females average 1.6 hectares (4.0 acres) in size, and can be as small as a single tree. Home ranges are clustered together into larger social-territorial units known as colonies. Slender lorises form sleeping groups of two to seven individuals. They are the only lorisids to sleep in social groups larger than a mother-infant pair. Such groups congregate about 30 minute before dawn, during which time participants will engage in a gregarious period of frequent social interactions. They then disperse at dusk. Adult slender lorises typically hunt separately during the night, although they will sometimes do so in pairs.

=== Communication ===
Several vocalisations can be produced by slender lorises. A defensive screech indicates stress, and is composed of a high-intensity chitter. Alternatively, a slender loris can produce a low "pant-growl" as part of a defensive display, which may be accompanied by bluff attacks. A rhythmic chitter is also used in defensive contexts, such as when rebuffing a conspecific if play behaviours become too rough. A typically sharp, monosyllabic territorial whistle is produced to threaten others or to defend one's territory. While pursuing females in oestrus, males utter a low, hissing appeasement call, which can also be produced when rejected by the female. Females reject male suitors with a monosyllabic chitter of low clicking or smacking sounds. Infants utter a "zic" call consisting of a short monosyllabic click to indicate discomfort when being groomed or when they exhibit fear in unfamiliar situations such as falling from their mothers. During play wrestling, participants produce a low, non-tonal sniffing sound. A short, low, monosyllabic whistle or squeak is used for contacting conspecifics in an affiliative context. When seized by a human, slender lorises produce a "scream" of long, repeated loud calls interrupted by inhalations. Non-vocal auditory signals are produced by deliberately rattling twigs; in northern Ceylonese slender lorises, twig-rattling can be used in dominance displays. A subspecies may tend to emit some vocalisations more than others, and can also produce unique variants of these vocalisations. Such variants could assist with mate identification through intraspecific recognition.

Olfaction is an important aspect of the territorial and reproductive behaviour of slender lorises, especially regarding urine marking. Communicative odours are acquired by sniffing and through contact with the observer's rhinarium (the naked skin surrounding the nostrils). Soluble, odorous substances are transported to the a sensory organ in the septum of the nose called a vomeronasal organ via movement of the tongue or along the middle furrow of the rhinarium. Slender lorises often travel with their nose pressed to the surfaces of substrates as an exploratory behaviour in new settings and in relation to urine marks left by other lorises. Conspecifics can be directly sniffed as part of olfactory communication, which often involves a male smelling the genital region of a female.

Visual communication can be accomplished through a small selection of facial expressions. When perceiving unfamiliar stimuli, slender lorises expose fur gaps in the corners of their mouths. Social distress prompts the drawing down of the ears to the side of the head. In severely distressing situations, the ears are laid backward against the head, which is also done while hunting. Stressful situations may also cause the cleft of the lip to become straight, whereas it is S-shaped when a loris is calm. Visual communication is also performed using body language; sharp, abrupt movements are indicative of an aggressive temperament, while content animals move swiftly and noiselessly. Suspensory movement beneath substrates indicates sexual receptiveness in females, as this prompts male attempts at mounting. To invite social grooming, the arm is presented forward, exposing the brachial scent gland.

=== Diet ===
The slender lorises are insectivores whose favoured prey includes ants, orthopterans, and spiders. These are food items that place slender lorises in an ecological niche typically belonging to predatory and parasitic invertebrates. Slender lorises visually track their prey from a distance of up to 2 metres (6 ft 7 in) prior to attacking, and maintain contact with their supportive substrate with two or three limbs while pouncing. As it strikes evasive prey such as orthopterans or moths, a slender loris compresses its ears and coils its hindlimbs in a manner akin to a pouncing house cat. This predatory pounce consists of a set of fixed behaviours initiated in response to optical stimuli, insofar as the full sequence of reaching, snatching, and the opening of the mouth are performed regardless of whether or not any prey has been seized. The hands or teeth are used to process captured prey prior to consumption, although small ants are eaten whole. The slender lorises ingest large amounts of toxic natural products from their prey. In addition to insects, they also eat frogs, lizards, and snails. Slender lorises also consume some non-prey food items, including shoots, young leaves, and hard-rind fruits. In Sri Lanka, they have been observed to consume the flowers of Cassia roxburghii. The slender lorises have slow metabolisms.

=== Reproduction ===
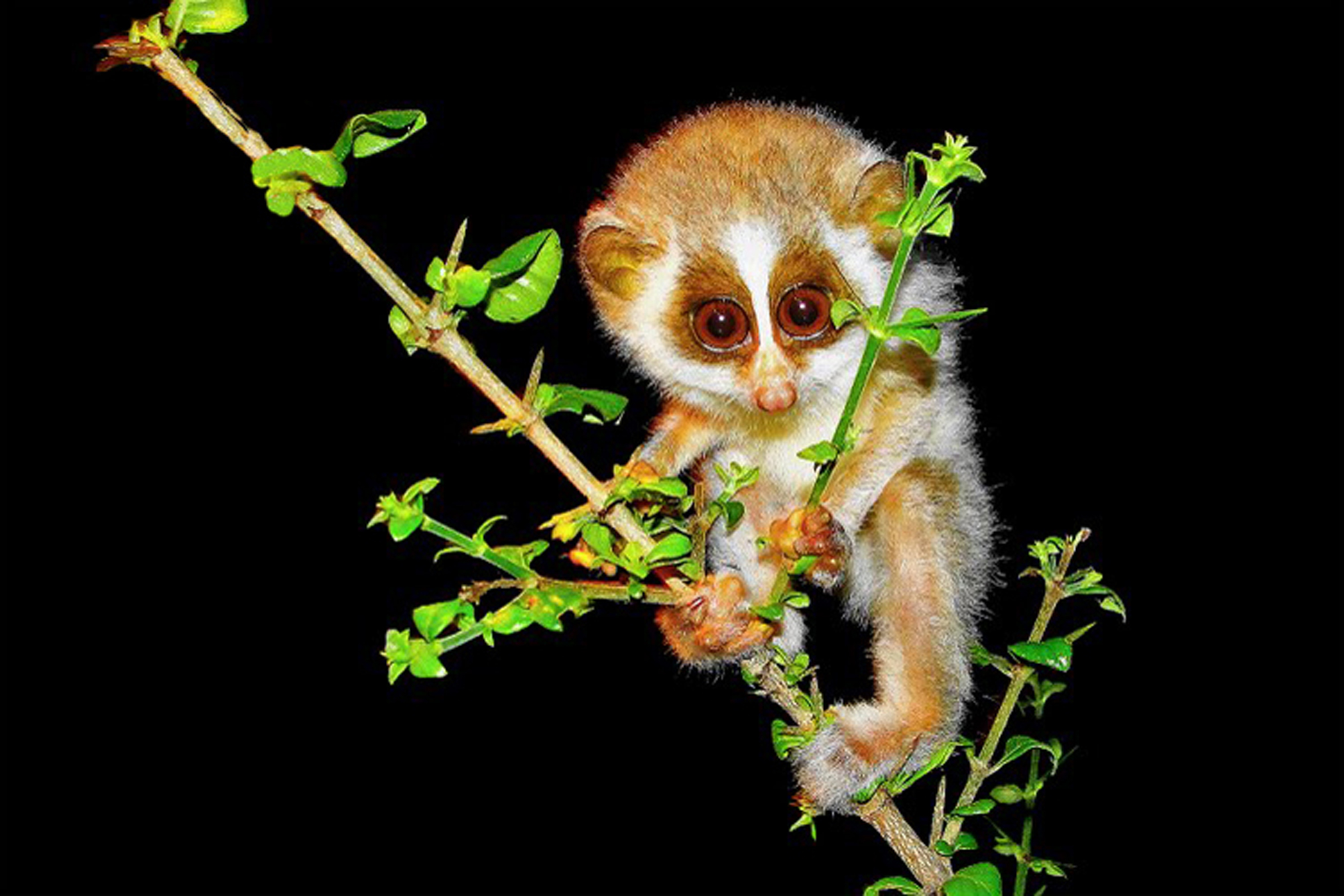
Infant slender lorises are parked while their mothers forage overnight.

Courtship involves pursuit by multiple males of a single female in oestrus. Males produce a copulatory plug in females after a successful mating, which the female sometimes removes and eats. Slender lorises undergo long gestation periods for animals of their size, and the gestation period is longer in red slender lorises than gray slender lorises. The two species are not capable of hybridising. Mating and births occur throughout the year; slender lorises were previously believed to be seasonal breeders, however this observed pattern may have been the result of altered behaviours in captive settings. Singleton, twin, and triplet births occur across slender loris taxa. The reproductive output of slender lorises about four infants per year. This productivity is aided by a combination of care provided by fathers and the production of milk with high energy content. Slender loris milk is abnormally nutritious compared to the typically poor-quality milk produced by most other primate species, which may allow for longer "parking" periods during which the mother is not required to attend to her offspring. Infants can be successfully born in a headfirst or in a breech position.

After birth, infants are immediately able to open their eyes and grip their mother's fur. During the first four weeks of an infant's life, it is carried on its mother's back while its father visits to groom both his mate and his offspring. Between four weeks and two months after birth, the infant begins to be parked during the night while the mother forages. During this parking period, gray slender loris fathers may visit their parked infants to play with them, whereas mothers rarely return to parked infants before dawn. An infant can move up to 20 metres (66 ft) from its parking location on its own throughout the night, and will summon its mother before dawn using the "zic" vocalisation. As infants age, their mothers retrieve them with less urgency. The father participates in the socialisation of the infant by comprising up to 40% of his infant's nightly activity, which is a significantly higher degree of direct paternal care than is demonstrated by other lorisids. Infant slender lorises may also receive paternal care from males other than their fathers, especially from those in their sleeping groups. This phenomenon may be related to the promiscuous mating of female slender lorises wherein intense sperm competition may confuse paternity, thereby resulting in affiliative male investment in an infant. Parent-offspring interactions often involve direct contact in the form of grooming and tolerance of infant play behaviours to an abnormal degree for nocturnal primates, as such patterns of parental behaviour are typically seen in diurnal species. Paternal care of infants is reduced in the red slender loris when compared to the gray slender loris; a captive study found there to be no interest demonstrated by a red slender loris father in his offspring. Slender loris mothers are known to care for infants other than their own. In captive settings, red slender loris mothers that experience stress commit infanticide against their own infants. The average lifespan of a slender loris is 15 years. In captivity, gray slender lorises can live as long as 20 years.

== Conservation status ==
Both species of slender loris are threatened by poaching, which can be motivated by some indigenous beliefs systems, such as those that hold that the body parts of slender lorises are magically significant. The eyes of slender lorises are prized in some Sri Lankan traditional medical practices, and gray slender loris body parts can be marketed as cure-all medicines. Slender loris vocalisations are believed by some Sri Lankans to be ill omens, resulting in the animals being stoned to death to ward off such superstitiously portended misfortune. Slender lorises are also threatened by the exotic pet trade, and are smuggled to circumvent restrictions on their trafficking. Anthropogenic causes of accidental death include collision with motor vehicles and electrocution from contact with uninsulated wires.

Habitat loss may pose the greatest threat to the survival of slender lorises. The development of major cities for residential and commercial usage is one cause of habitat loss, although some populations of gray slender loris can survive in urban areas such as Bengaluru, given sufficient tree coverage. Other causes of habitat destruction include the unsustainable exploitation of forests for resources such as firewood and for agricultural expansion for both smallholder and industrial purposes. Forest fires also result in the destruction of slender loris habitats. A 2015 survey of the Hakgala Strict Nature Reserve found that only 25% of the habitats in the protected area was suitable for habitation by slender lorises, complicating conservation efforts.

The International Union for the Conservation of Nature lists the red slender loris as an endangered species and the gray slender loris as near threatened. Both species are listed under Appendix II by CITES. In India, gray slender lorises are assigned Schedule I by the Wild Life (Protection) Act, 1972, affording them the highest level of legal protection. The Kadavur Slender Loris Wildlife Sanctuary in Tamil Nadu was declared India's first slender loris sanctuary in 2022.
