= Anna Nekaris =

British anthropologist and professor

- Other names: K.A.I. Nekaris, K. Anne-Isole Nekaris
- Education: Washington University in St. Louis; University of Missouri, Columbia; Louis Pasteur University
- Scientific career
- Workplaces: Anglia Ruskin University, Oxford Brookes University
- Thesis: The socioecology of the slender loris (Loris tardigradus lydekkerianus) in Dindigul, Tamil Nadu, South India (1999)
- Website: https://nocturama.org/

Anna Nekaris OBE is a British anthropologist and Professor of Ecology, Conservation and Environment at Anglia Ruskin University. Previously she was a professor in primate conservation in the School of Law and Social Sciences at Oxford Brookes University. She is interested in the conservation of Asian nocturnal animals and African nocturnal primates. She was appointed an Officer of the Order of the British Empire in the 2024 New Year Honours.

== Early life and education ==
Nekaris completed her undergraduate education at the University of Missouri, Columbia and Louis Pasteur University, where she focused on anthropology and primate conservation. She was a graduate student at the Washington University in St. Louis. She majored in anthropology, and her doctorate focused on biological anthropology. Her PhD research investigated the socioecology of the slender loris in Dindigul.

== Career ==
Nekaris has dedicated her career to the conservation of Asian nocturnal animals and African nocturnal primates. Since 2011, she has led the Little Fireface Project, which investigates the behavioural ecology of slow lorises in the wild, zoos and rescue centres, using a combination of genetics, acoustics, museum studies and taxonomy. Little Fireface also delivers education programmes for communities in South America, Asia and Africa.

Nekaris worked to protect slow lorises in Java. Slow lorises are endangered because of habitat loss and the illegal wildlife trade, which involves captors clipping their teeth so their venomous teeth are no longer dangerous. Nekaris installed pipes that lorises could use as bridges, which allows them to reach new trees that they couldn't catch before. She delivered a TED talk on the influence of social media on the global population of slow lorises, and how it can both advance understanding and hinder conservation efforts.

Nekaris has explored how slow lorises use their venom. Slow lorises are one of the world's only venomous mammals, and have been known to use their venom to attack each other. To understand how slow lorises use their venom, Nekaris used radio collars to track Javan slow lorises, and spent 8 years monitoring their behaviour. They captured the slow lorises and analysed their bite wounds, finding the males suffered more frequent bites than females, and necrotic wounds were a regular occurrence. She revealed that the creatures were very territorial and use their venom to settle disputes.

She was elected an Officer of the Order of the British Empire in the 2024 New Year Honours.

== Publications ==
- Alejandro Estrada; Paul A. Garber; Anthony B Rylands; et al. (January 2017). "Impending extinction crisis of the world's primates: Why primates matter". Science Advances. 3 (1) e1600946. Bibcode:2017SciA....3E0946E. doi:10.1126/sciadv.1600946. ISSN 2375-2548. PMC 5242557. PMID 28116351. Wikidata Q28559920.
- J. S. Thorn; V. Nijman; D. Smith; K. A. I. Nekaris (March 2009). "Ecological niche modelling as a technique for assessing threats and setting conservation priorities for Asian slow lorises (Primates:Nycticebus)". Diversity and Distributions. 15 (2): 289–298. doi:10.1111/j.1472-4642.2008.00535.x. ISSN 1366-9516. Wikidata Q56484146.
- K Anne-Isola Nekaris; By K Anne-Isola Nekaris; Nicola Campbell; Tim G Coggins; E Johanna Rode; Vincent Nijman (2013). "Tickled to death: analysing public perceptions of 'cute' videos of threatened species (slow lorises - Nycticebus spp.) on Web 2.0 sites". PLOS One. 8 (7) e69215. Bibcode:2013PLoSO...869215N. doi:10.1371/journal.pone.0069215. ISSN 1932-6203. PMC 3722300. PMID 23894432. Wikidata Q21090738.
