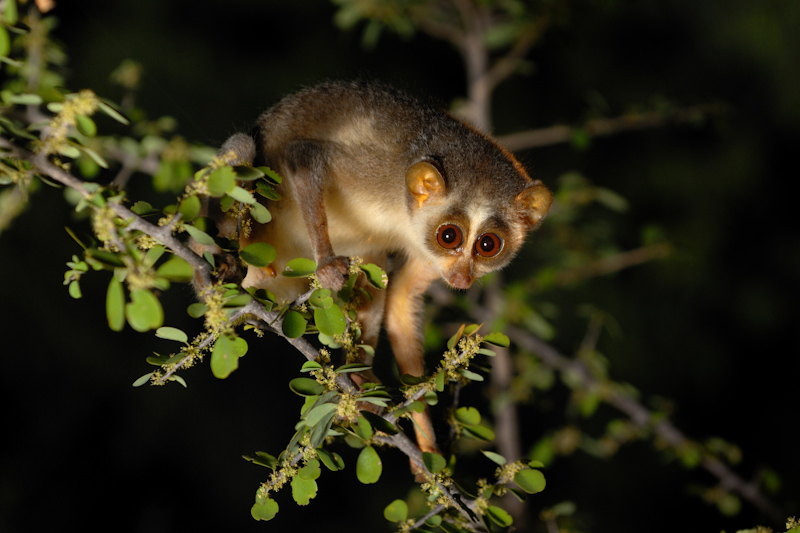

Conservation status
- Near Threatened (IUCN 3.1)

Scientific classification
- Kingdom: Animalia
- Phylum: Chordata
- Class: Mammalia
- Infraclass: Placentalia
- Order: Primates
- Suborder: Strepsirrhini
- Family: Lorisidae
- Genus: Loris
- Species: L. lydekkerianus

Binomial name
- Loris lydekkerianus Cabrera, 1908

Subspecies
- L. l. lydekkerianus (Cabrera, 1908); L. l. malabaricus (Wroughton, 1917); L. l. nordicus (Osman Hill, 1933); L. l. grandis (Osman Hill and Phillips, 1932)
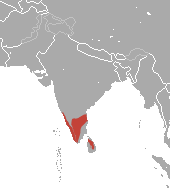
- Gray slender loris range

= Gray slender loris =

Species of primate

The gray slender loris (Loris lydekkerianus) is a species of primate in the family Loridae. It is native to India and Sri Lanka and inhabits subtropical and tropical dry forests and subtropical or tropical moist lowland forests. It is threatened by habitat loss.

== Taxonomy ==
Together with the red slender loris (Loris tardigradus), the grey slender loris (Loris lydekkerianus) is a type of slender loris (genus Loris) in the strepsirrhine primate family Lorisidae. In 1908 Spanish zoologist Ángel Cabrera first described the Mysore slender loris (Loris tardigradus lydekkerianus) in Chennai, India, which he named for the English naturalist Richard Lydekker. This subspecies was further described by William Charles Osman Hill in his seminal primate book Primates: Comparative Anatomy and Taxonomy (1953). Hill believed there was one species of slender loris which was further split into six subspecies, two in India and four in Sri Lanka. In 1998 biological anthropologist Colin Groves recognised two species, L. tardigradus and L. lydekkerianus, which have been widely accepted by the scientific community. Loris lydekkerianus now includes four geographically separated subspecies, L. l. lydekkerianus (previously L. t. lydekkerianus) and L. l. malabaricus in India and L. l. nordicus and L. l. grandis in Sri Lanka.

- Genus Loris
  - Red slender loris, Loris tardigradus
  - Gray slender loris, Loris lydekkerianus
    - Malabar slender loris, Loris lydekkerianus malabaricus, inhabits the Malabar Coast moist forests region of the Indian states of Kerala and Karnataka
    - Mysore slender loris, Loris lydekkerianus lydekkerianus, inhabits dry forests of the southern Deccan Plateau and Eastern Ghats of Karnataka, Tamil Nadu, and Andhra Pradesh
    - Northern Ceylonese slender loris, Loris lydekkerianus nordicus, inhabits the dry northern and eastern forest regions of Sri Lanka
    - Highland slender loris, Loris lydekkerianus grandis, inhabits highland areas of Sri Lanka

A slender loris group known as the montane slender loris (taxon nycticeboides) has had uncertain classification and variously placed as a subspecies of L. lydekkerianus, L. tardigradus, and as a distinct species. A 2019 study based on partial CO1 sequences showed the taxon can be classified in a single haplogroup with L. t. tardigradus.

== Physical description ==
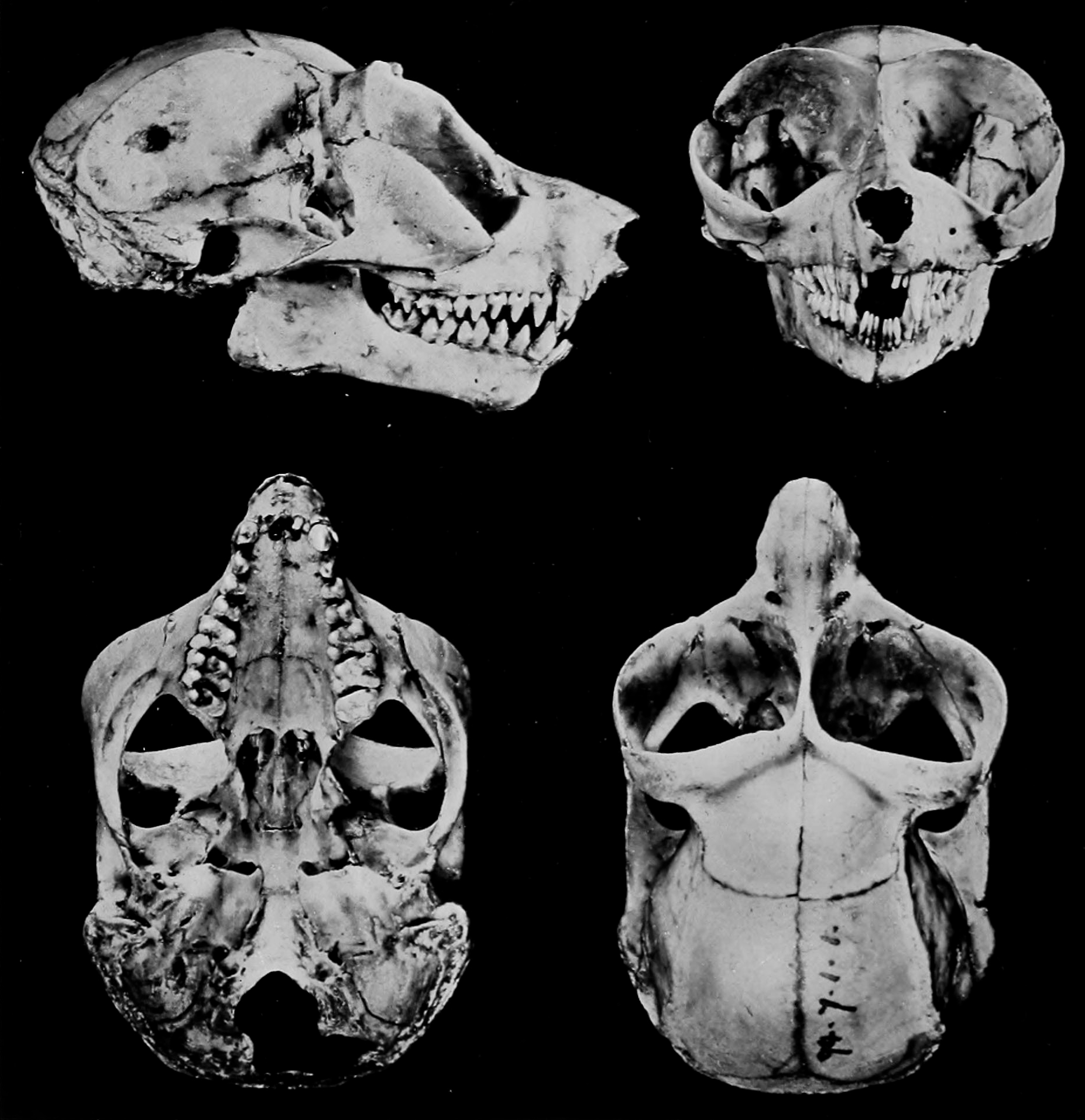
Skull

Slender lorises have extremely gracile limbs and extreme stereoscopic vision. The gray slender loris has a wide variation in pelage colour and each subspecies can be identified by this. The fur is short and gray or reddish on their backs, sometimes a darker stripe extends from the top of their head to the end of their back. The ventrum is white or buff-coloured. The eyes are surrounded with darker fur and have orbits which look straight forward giving excellent stereoscopic vision and are located the closest together amongst the primates. Between the eyes there is a white patch of hair known as the median stripe. The muzzle is larger and less pointed than the red slender loris. The hands are also highly specialised with a reduced second digit that allows the loris to cling to small branches. This is further augmented by adaptions in the first metatarsal that are thought to allow an extremely firm grasp. The tail is vestigial. The average head-body length is 18–26 centimetres (7.1–10.2 in).

In Sri Lankan subspecies, Loris lydekkerianus grandis has short ears, and a heart-shaped face. Basal hairs of the vent of Loris lydekkerianus grandis are black and whereas those of Loris lydekkerianus nordicus are white in colour.

== Behaviour ==
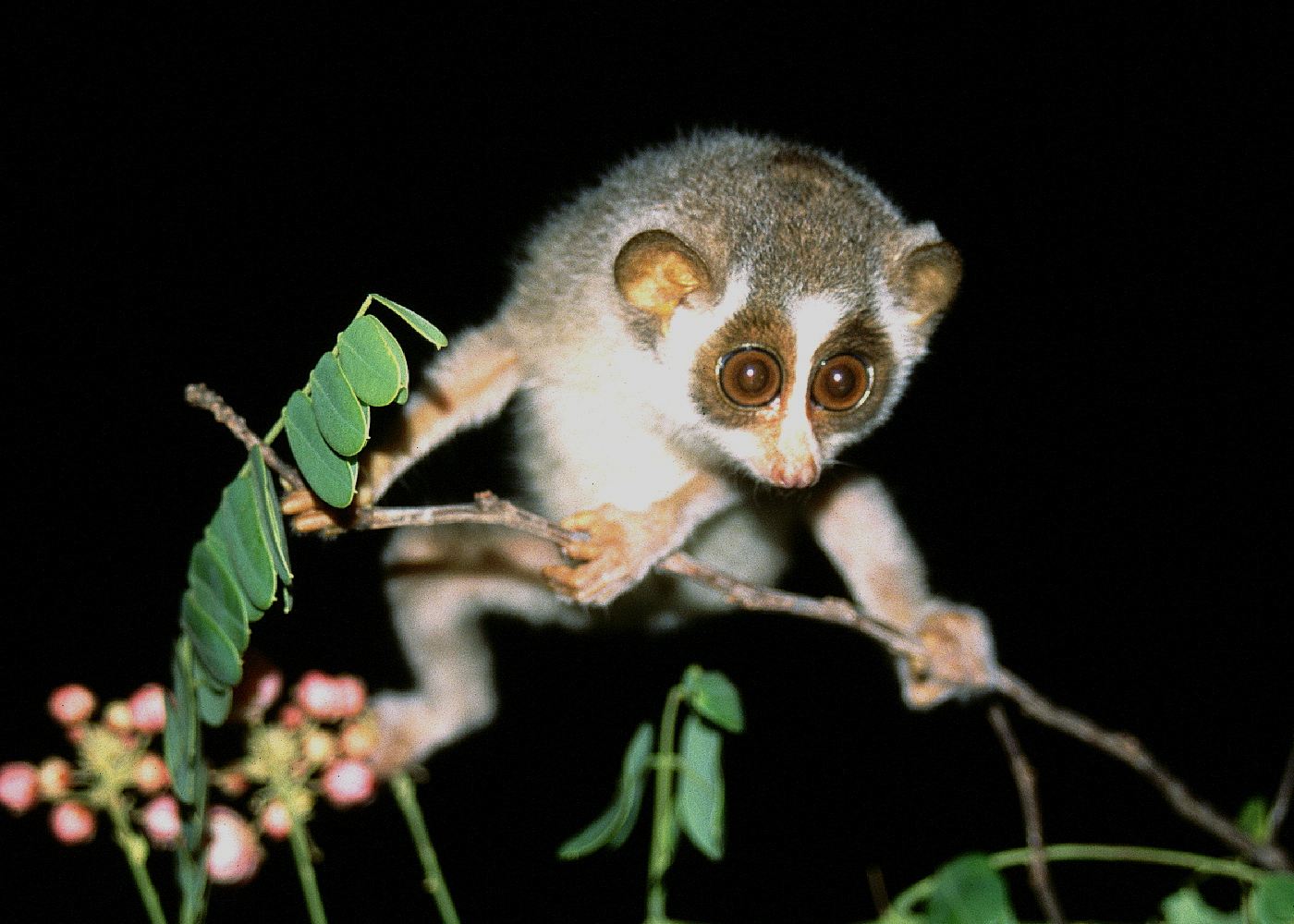
The gray slender loris is nocturnal and arboreal.

The behaviour of the gray slender loris is amongst the least known of the primates, despite the relatively large number of studies undertaking during the 2000s. Like other lorises, they are nocturnal and emerge from their roost cavities only at dusk. They are mainly insectivorous. They primarily eat insects but do occasionally eat fruits, flowers, and small animals like mice and geckos when given the opportunity. In southern India, the nominate race is often found in acacia and tamarind dominated forests or scrubs near cultivations. Males hold larger home ranges than females. They are usually solitary while foraging, and it is rare for them to be seen in pairs or groups. However they may roost in groups of up to 7 that include young of the recent and older litters. Adult males and females have individual home ranges and sleeping group associations are usually composed of a female and her offspring. Communicate with a range of vocalisations and also use urine and scent marking. Also, olfaction and visual signaling at a distance of at least 20m. Lorises interact throughout the night and sleep in groups during the daytime. Females with exclusive home ranges, rarely interact with other females except mothers and daughters. Females are more affiliated with males that are in the same sleeping area. Males tend to be more aggressive to other males that are not associated with their sleeping area. However, there is positive interaction with males that are within the sleeping area. The males also tend to infants that are in the sleeping area and sleeping arrangements are the only social behaviour lorises take part in.

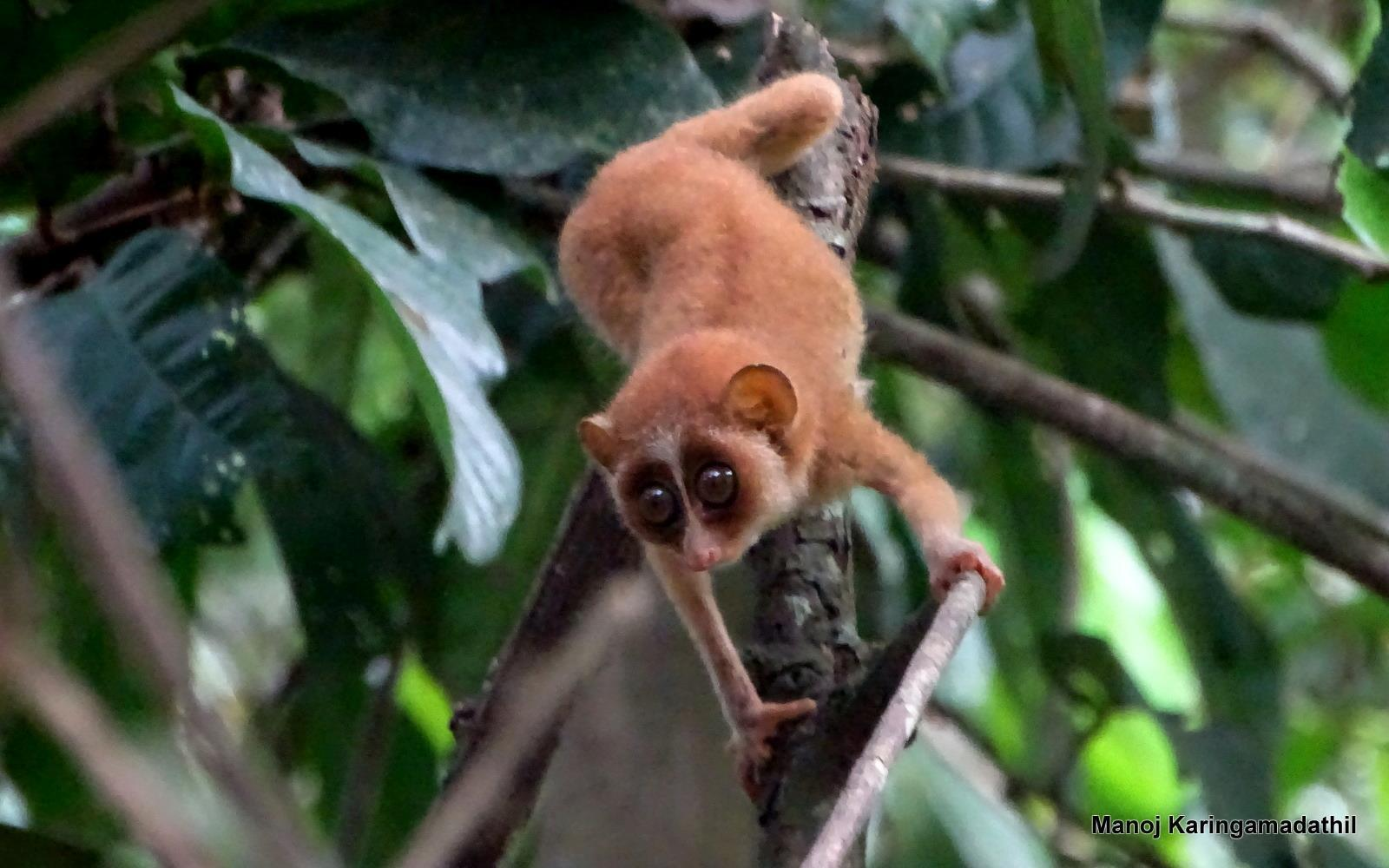
From Kannur, Kerala, India at day.

== Reproduction ==
Lorises are found to be promiscuous, multiple males competing for one female for mating. Mating occurs biannually, April–June, and October–December. Although mating occurs twice a year, lorises can only breed once a year. One estrus cycle will fail and another will begin approximately 2 weeks following. Gestation is approximately 170 days. Twins are very common among lorises. The reproductive tract and ovarian cycle reflect the general mammalian plans. As far as lactation, four teats develop and produce milk before the infant is born. After giving birth, females are non-receptive to males and care for their young. The reproductive rate of the slender loris is among the lowest of any primate under 500g.

== Geographic range and habitat ==
Found in southern India and Sri Lanka, the gray slender loris inhabits primary and secondary rainforest, dry semi-deciduous forest, and montane cloud forest up to 2,000 metres (6,600 ft) above sea level. It is found in south-western India roughly between the Tapti and Godavari Rivers down to the south coast of the subcontinent. The subspecies are separated geographically. In south-western India, the Malabar gray slender loris occurs in the wet forests of the Western Ghats in the states of Karnataka, Kerala and Tamil Nadu up to an altitude of 1,200 metres (3,900 ft). The Mysore gray slender loris inhabits the tropical dry forests of the Eastern Ghats in the states of Andhra Pradesh, Karnataka and Tamil Nadu, frequenting open Euphorbia scrub forests and Acacia trees at an altitude of 300–500 metres (980–1,640 ft). It can also be found on the dry eastern slopes of the Western Ghats.

== Conservation status ==
Although considered near threatened on the IUCN Red List and classified under Schedule I (Part 1) of the Indian Wildlife Act, 1972, the threat to these primates is increasing. Loris is used to make love potions, treat leprosy and eye ailments. Some villagers keep lorises as pets, but because they are difficult to maintain there is high mortality. Some cities have them captive in zoos, and astrologers use them to pick out tarot cards. Insects form the main source of food for lorises. Farmlands, which are high in cattle waste, produce large amounts of insects. Thus lorises do not compete with humans for resources and therefore tend to be tolerated by them. Habitat fragmentation is also a threat to the loris population, as well as loss of acacia trees, which is a preferred tree species for the loris. Conservation efforts are developing and more research on conservation efforts are ongoing.
