= Potoli =

- Village
- Country: India
- State: Karnataka
- District: Belgaum
- Talukas: Joida

Languages
  - Official: Kannada
- Time zone: UTC+5:30 (IST)

Potoli is a village in Belgaum district of Karnataka, India.

== Population ==
At the 2011 census the population was 91, with 44 males and 47 females, 12 children under six and a literacy rate of 70.89%.
