= William Charles Osman Hill =

British anthropologist and anatomist (1901–1975)

William Charles Osman Hill FRSE FZS FLS FRAI
- Born: 13 July 1901
- Died: 25 January 1975 (aged 73)
- Education: University of Birmingham
- Known for: Primates: Comparative Anatomy and Taxonomy
- Spouse: Yvonne Stranger (m. 1947 – 1975)
- Scientific career
- Fields: Primatology; Anatomy; Anthropology
- Institutions: University of Birmingham; Ceylon Medical College; University of Edinburgh; Zoological Society of London; Yerkes National Primate Research Center; University of Turin
- Author abbrev. (zoology): Hill

William Charles Osman Hill FRSE FZS FLS FRAI (13 July 1901 – 25 January 1975) was a British anatomist, primatologist, and a leading authority on primate anatomy during the 20th century. He is best known for his nearly completed eight-volume series, Primates: Comparative Anatomy and Taxonomy, which covered all living and extinct primates known at the time in full detail and contained illustrations created by his wife, Yvonne. Schooled at King Edward VI Camp Hill School for Boys in Birmingham and University of Birmingham, he went on to publish 248 works and accumulated a vast collection of primate specimens that are now stored at the Royal College of Surgeons of England.

== Early life and education ==
William Charles Osman Hill was born on 13 July 1901 the son of James Osman Hill and his wife, Fanny Martin.

He was educated first at King Edward VI Camp Hill School for Boys in Birmingham, and later obtained his degrees from the University of Birmingham. During medical school, also at the University of Birmingham, he won three junior student prizes and the Ingleby Scholarship in Midwifery. He obtained his primary medical degrees in 1924, and the same year took on the role of lecturer in zoology. Osman Hill earned his MD with honours in 1925. He earned his Ch. B while in medical school.

== Career ==
Upon graduation, Osman Hill continued his role as a lecturer at the University of Birmingham under an apprenticeship until 1930, but teaching anatomy instead of zoology. In 1930, his career took shape when he moved to Sri Lanka, then known as Ceylon, to become both Chair of Anatomy and Professor of Anatomy at the Ceylon Medical College (more recently named Faculty of Medicine of the University of Colombo or Colombo Medical School). His position allowed him to pursue anthropological studies of the indigenous Veddah people and comparative anatomy of primates. During this time, he began developing a private menagerie of exotic and native species. Consisting mostly of a variety of primates and parrots, the collection reported included several types of cockatoo (family Cacatuidae), red-fan parrots (Deroptyus accipitrinus), eclectus parrots (Eclectus roratus), star tortoises (genus Geochelone), leopard tortoises (Stigmochelys pardalis), Galápagos tortoises (Chelonoidis nigra), and ruddy mongooses (Herpestes smithii). Osman Hill held this position in Ceylon for 14 years, returning to the UK after being appointed as Reader in Anthropology at the University of Edinburgh in 1945. Upon his departure from Ceylon, his menagerie was divided between the London Zoo and the National Zoological Gardens of Sri Lanka.

Five years later in 1950, he became prosector for the Zoological Society of London and remained there for twelve years. When he left the London Zoo in 1962, the old prosectorium that has been his office was closed, many preserved biological specimens were discarded, and the era of anatomists working at the London Zoo—starting from the time of Richard Owen—came to a close. Between 1957 and 1958, Osman Hill also acted as a visiting scholar at Emory University in Atlanta, Georgia. Later in 1958, primatologist Jane Goodall studied primate behaviour under him in preparation for her studies of wild chimpanzees. In 1962, he was hired as the assistant director of the Yerkes National Primate Research Center (YNPRC) in Atlanta after being turned down for the position of director.

The Royal Society of Edinburgh honoured him as a fellow in 1955 and for his contributions to science awarded him both its gold medal and the Macdougal-Brisbane Prize. Upon his retiring from YNPRC in 1969, the Royal College of Surgeons of England made him a Hunterian Trustee. Following retirement, Osman Hill divided his time between his home at Folkestone and his continued work at the University of Turin. His relentless work in anatomy ended only during the final stages of his terminal illness, after he had had three years of increased illness as well as diabetes.

== Publications ==
During his career, Osman Hill wrote 248 publications, all academic journal articles or chapters in books based primarily upon his own observations. His first paper, which discussed the comparative anatomy of the pancreas, was published in 1926. In all, his works, which continued being published until the year of his death, focused on the anatomy and behaviour of humans, primates, and other mammals.

Osman Hill is best known for writing Primates: Comparative Anatomy and Taxonomy, an eight-volume series that aimed to include all living and extinct primates. Published by Edinburgh University between 1953 and 1974, the series was the culmination of 50 years of his scientific research and thought. Each volume, starting with the strepsirrhines, covered its subjects exhaustively, including native and scientific nomenclature, anatomical structure, genetics, behaviour and palaeontology. The books were illustrated with both photographs and drawings, most of which were made by his wife, Yvonne. The series was known for its breadth and depth, however it was never completed. Projected as a nine-volume set, Osman Hill died in 1975, leaving his magnum opus unfinished. With five sections of the final volume written, including material on the taxonomy and most of the anatomy of langurs, it was hoped that his widow would be able to follow through with plans to prepare and publish them. However, she died one year later.

This monographic series often received praise for its encyclopaedic content, but was also criticised for occasional omissions, errors, and lack of specificity.

=== Selected publications ===
The eight volumes for which Osman Hill is best remembered were

- Primates Comparative Anatomy and Taxonomy (1953–1974)
  - Osman Hill, W. C. (1953). Primates Comparative Anatomy and Taxonomy I—Strepsirhini. Edinburgh Univ Pubs Science & Maths, No 3. Edinburgh University Press. OCLC 500576914.
  - Osman Hill, W. C. (1955). Primates Comparative Anatomy and Taxonomy II—Haplorhini: Tarsioidea. Edinburgh Univ Pubs Science & Maths, No 3b. Edinburgh University Press. OCLC 500576923.
  - Osman Hill, W. C. (1957). Primates Comparative Anatomy and Taxonomy III—Pithecoidea Platyrrhini. Edinburgh Univ Pubs Science & Maths, No 3c. OCLC 500576928.
  - Osman Hill, W. C. (1960). Primates Comparative Anatomy and Taxonomy IV—Cebidae, Part A. Edinburgh Univ Pubs Science & Maths, No 3d. OCLC 500576933.
  - Osman Hill, W. C. (1962). Primates Comparative Anatomy and Taxonomy V—Cebidae, Part B. Edinburgh Univ Pubs Science & Maths, No 3e. OCLC 500576939.
  - Osman Hill, W. C. (1966). Primates Comparative Anatomy and Taxonomy VI—Catarrhini Cercopithecoidea: Cercopithecinae. Edinburgh Univ Pubs Science & Maths, No 3f. OCLC 500576943.
  - Osman Hill, W. C. (1974). Primates Comparative Anatomy and Taxonomy VII—Cynopithecinae (Cercocebus, Macaca, Cynopithecus). Edinburgh Univ Pubs Science & Maths, No 3g. OCLC 613648477.
  - Osman Hill, W. C. (1970). Primates Comparative Anatomy and Taxonomy VIII—Cynopithecinae (Papio, Mandrillus, Theropithecus). Edinburgh Univ Pubs Science & Maths, No 3h. OCLC 500576950.

The following is a list of other selected publications written by Osman Hill between 1926 and 1974.

- Osman Hill, W. C.; Phillips, W. W. A. (1932). "A new race of slender loris from the highlands of Ceylon". Ceylon Journal of Science B. 17: 109–122.
- Osman Hill, W. C. (1933). "A monograph of the genus Loris, with an account of the external, cranial and dental characters of the genus: A revision of the known forms; And the description of a new form from Northern Ceylon". Ceylon Journal of Science B. 18: 89–132.
- Osman Hill, W. C. (1934). "A monograph on the purple-faced leaf-monkeys (Pithecus vetulus)". Ceylon Journal of Science B. 19: 23–88.
- Osman Hill, W. C. (1942). "The slender loris of the Horton Plains, Ceylon. Loris tardigradus nycticeboides subsp, nov". Journal of the Bombay Natural History Society. 43: 73–78.
- Osman Hill, W. C. (1942). "The highland macaque of Ceylon". Journal of the Bombay Natural History Society. 43: 402–406.
- Osman Hill, W. C. (1945). "Notes on the Dissection of Two Dugongs". Journal of Mammalogy. 26 (2): 153–175. doi:10.2307/1375092. JSTOR 1375092.
- Osman Hill, W. C.; Rewell, R. E. (1948). "The caecum of primates.—Its appendages, mesenteries and blood supply". The Transactions of the Zoological Society of London. 26 (3): 199–256. doi:10.1111/j.1096-3642.1948.tb00223.x.
- Hill, W. C. O. (1952). "The external and visceral anatomy of the Olive Colobus Monkey (Procolobus verus)". Proceedings of the Zoological Society of London. 122: 127–186. doi:10.1111/j.1469-7998.1952.tb06315.x.
- Osman Hill, W. C. (1953). "Note on the taxonomy of the genus Tarsius". Proceedings of the Zoological Society of London. 123: 13–16. doi:10.1111/j.1096-3642.1953.tb00149.x.
- Osman Hill, W. C. (1953). "Caudal cutaneous specializations in Tarsius". Proceedings of the Zoological Society of London. 123: 17–26. doi:10.1111/j.1096-3642.1953.tb00150.x.
- Osman Hill, W. C.; Davies, D. V. (1954). "The reproductive organs in Hapalemur and Lepilemur". Proceedings of the Royal Society of Edinburgh, Section B. 65 (3): 251–270. doi:10.1017/s0080455x00014600.
- Osman Hill, W. C.; Davies, D. V. (1956). "The heart and great vessels in the Strepsirhini". Transactions of the Royal Society of Edinburgh. 63 (1): 115–127. doi:10.1017/s0080456800003033. S2CID 88242324.
- Osman Hill, W. C.; Booth, A. H. (1957). "Voice and larynx in African and Asiatic Colobidae". Journal of the Bombay Natural History Society. 54: 309–321.
- Osman Hill, W. C. (1958). "Pharynx, oesophagus, stomach, small and large intestine. Form and position". In Hofer, H.; Schultz, A. H.; Starck, D. (eds.). Primatologia. Vol. 3. Basel: Karger. pp. 139–207.
- Osman Hill, W. C. (1958). "External genitalia". In Hofer, H.; Schultz, A. H.; Starck, D. (eds.). Primatologia. Vol. 3. Basel: Karger. pp. 630–704.
- Osman Hill, W. C. (1959). "The Anatomy of Callimico goeldii (Thomas): A Primitive American Primate". Transactions of the American Philosophical Society. New Series. 49 (5): 1–116. doi:10.2307/1005807. JSTOR 1005807.
- Osman Hill, W. C. (1972). Evolutionary Biology of Primates. Academic Press. pp. 233. ISBN 978-0-12-528750-0.
- Osman Hill, W. C. (1972). "Taxonomic status of the Macaques Macaca mulatta Zimm. and Macaca irus Cuvier (= M. fascicularis Raffles)". Journal of Human Evolution. 1 (1): 49–72. doi:10.1016/0047-2484(72)90041-3.

== Legacy ==
Today we think that structure cannot be divorced from function; anatomists have become physiologists, physiologists biochemists, and biochemists physicists; anatomy probes the sub-molecular. However, our modern world was soundly built on the foundations laid by men such as Osman Hill, and men such as he still fill an important role.

— R. N. Fiennes, Journal of Medical Primatology

Osman Hill is remembered as a "distinguished anatomist", "eminent primatologist", and the foremost authority on primate anatomy of his time. However, he did not consider himself a primatologist, but instead related best to old-school anatomists and naturalists, who studied the entire biological world and considered their own observations and recordings as sufficient. To these ends, he used his curiosity and broad knowledge of natural history.

Osman Hill was remembered for his skill at dissection, and was noted for his ability to make quick, but accurate sketches of the anatomical features his scalpel revealed. He is also remembered for his work as a "painstaking investigator", physician, and anthropologist. In his honour, two species have been named after him: Osman Hill's mangabey (Lophocebus osmani ) and the Colombo wolf snake (Lycodon osmanhilli ). The Primate Society of Great Britain named their Osman Hill Medal award after him. The award is given every two years for distinguished contributions to primatology.

He is responsible for describing one subspecies of black-and-white ruffed lemur (Varecia variegata), the southern black-and-white ruffed lemur (V. v. editorum) in 1952; one subspecies of toque macaque (Macaca sinica), the highland toque macaque (M. s. opisthomelas) in 1942; one subspecies of red slender loris (Loris tardigradus), the Horton Plains slender loris (L. t. nycticeboides) in 1942; and two subspecies of grey slender loris (Loris lydekkerianus), the highland slender loris (L. l. grandis) in 1932 and the dry zone slender loris (L. l. nordicus) in 1933.

His extensive collection of biological primate specimens, which included tissues and skeletons, is preserved at the Royal College of Surgeons of England.

== Personal life ==
The loss of a friend is always saddening, but when this friend was also a teacher of science and life our appreciation, for the knowledge with which we were enriched by him, enhances our sorrow beyond words.

— B. Chiarelli, Obituary in Journal of Human Evolution

Osman Hill married his wife, Yvonne Stranger, a barrister, in 1947. Yvonne, the only daughter of Harold Stranger KC, MP, was not only his devoted wife, but also a collaborator and illustrator of his works. The couple preferred a small, close-knit circle of friends, and the dinners they hosted for their friends included the best wines and exotic dishes, such as python stew. Yvonne died close to a year after her husband.

Osman Hill was described in a memorial published in the International Journal of Primatology (1981) as being "short and rotund, with twinkling blue eyes, a quiet manner, and a strong sense of humor." He was particularly remembered for his eagerness to help young researchers. In the Journal of Medical Primatology he was described as an "entertaining companion with a quick and ready wit." In another memorial, published in the Journal of Anatomy in 1975, he was described as friendly and tolerant, as well as "a merry man, vigorous, of humane culture, having the humour and good sense natural to those bred in the Provinces: a good Englishman." He was known to value simple citizenship and academics, and held small regard for people who "aspired to monarchy." At Yerkes in Atlanta, some staff members viewed him as "the archetypical English scholar-gentleman who viewed those from the 'colonies' as a step below the British."

In the British Who's Who, Osman Hill named field ornithology, botany, photography, and travel as his recreations. Other casual interests included drugstore ice cream, good eating, old buildings, and gardening with his wife.
