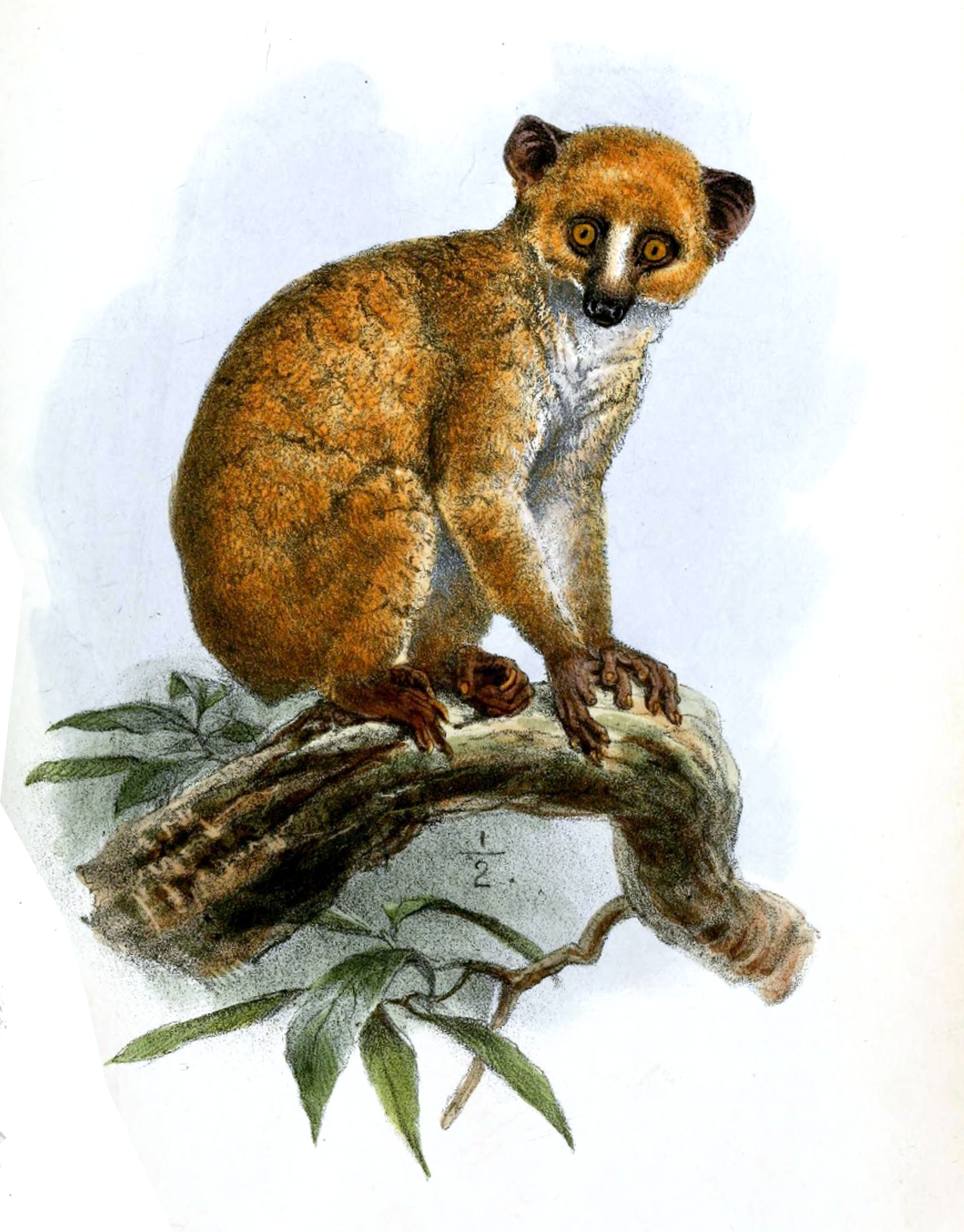
- Calabar angwantibo, Arctocebus calabarensis

Scientific classification
- Kingdom: Animalia
- Phylum: Chordata
- Class: Mammalia
- Order: Primates
- Suborder: Strepsirrhini
- Family: Lorisidae
- Subfamily: Perodicticinae; Gray, 1870

Type genus
- Perodicticus Bennett, 1831

Genera
- Perodicticus; Arctocebus
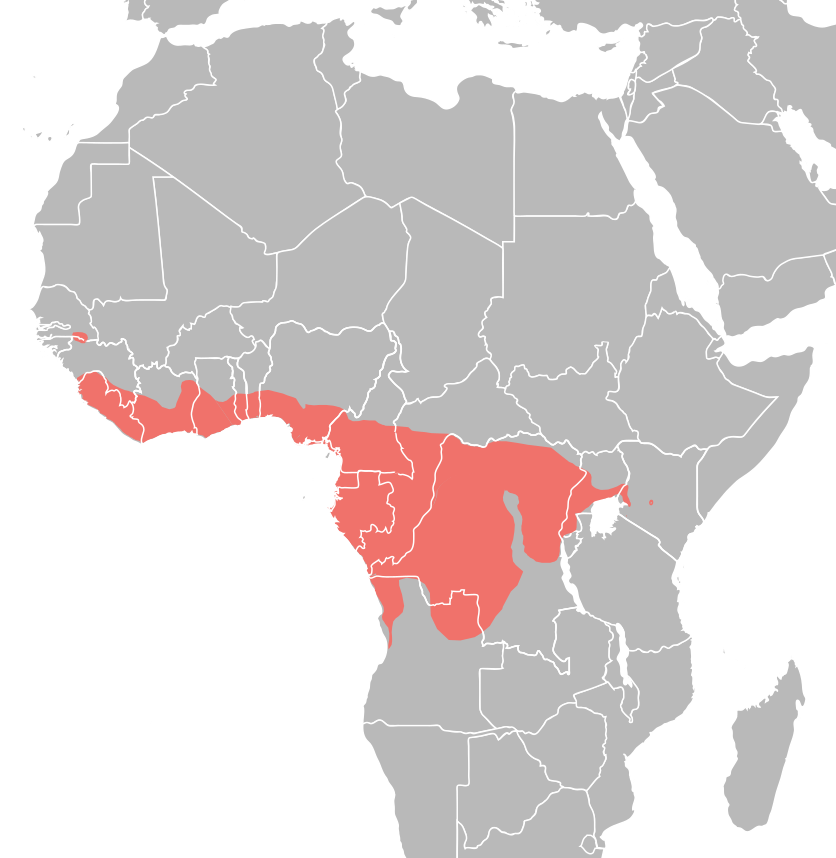
- Perodicticinae distribution

= Perodicticinae =

Subfamily of primates

Perodicticinae is a subfamily of the family Lorisidae. It includes five species of African primates as shown under taxonomy below.

They have a vestigial tail and index finger. The snout is pointed and the ears and eyes are large. The coat is dense, brown and woolly.

== Taxonomy ==
- Family Lorisidae
  - Subfamily Perodicticinae
    - Genus Arctocebus
      - Calabar angwantibo, Arctocebus calabarensis
      - Golden angwantibo, Arctocebus aureus
    - Genus Perodicticus
      - Central African potto, Perodicticus edwardsi
      - East African potto, Perodicticus ibeanus
      - West African potto, Perodicticus potto
  - Subfamily Lorisinae

The false potto (Pseudopotto martini) is now thought to be a misidentified individual of a Perodicticus species.
