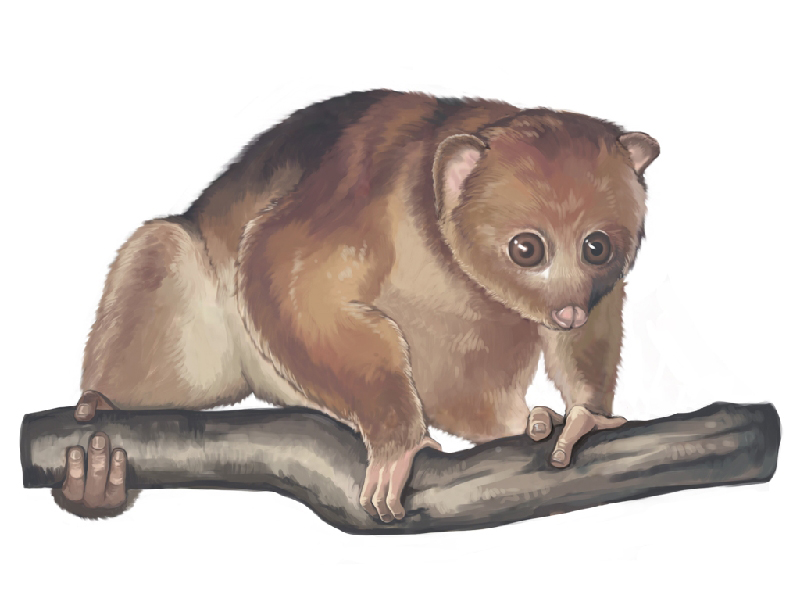

Conservation status
- Least Concern (IUCN 3.1)

Scientific classification
- Kingdom: Animalia
- Phylum: Chordata
- Class: Mammalia
- Order: Primates
- Suborder: Strepsirrhini
- Family: Lorisidae
- Genus: Arctocebus
- Species: A. aureus

Binomial name
- Arctocebus aureus de Winton, 1902
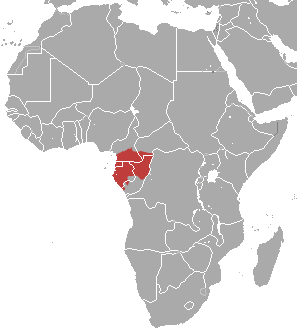
- Golden angwantibo range

Synonyms
- ruficeps Thomas, 1913

= Golden angwantibo =

Species of primate

The golden angwantibo (Arctocebus aureus) is a strepsirrhine primate of the family Lorisidae that is endemic to west-central Africa. It is native to Cameroon, the Central African Republic, the Republic of the Congo, Equatorial Guinea and Gabon, where it can be found in small, localised distributions. It is a medium-sized lorisid of about 22 centimetres (8.7 in) in length and weighing 210 grams (7.4 oz). It is the smaller of the two angwantibo species. The pelage of the golden angwantibo is of a lustrous orange hue with a woolly texture, differentiating it from the duller Calabar angwantibo (Arctocebus calabarensis). It possesses typical strepsirrhine traits such as a toothcomb and grooming claws on the second pedal digits. The manual index fingers is absent, which is an adaptation that facilitates gripping branches and lianas for its slow, cryptic style of locomotion. As an angwantibo, it possesses a unique thorax consisting of overlapping ribs, which may play a role in predation avoidance or balancing the animal as it climbs.

The golden angwantibo is a nocturnal and solitary but social animal, with a primarily insectivorous diet that favours difficult-to-process species such as various caterpillars. Its dietary specialisation for noxious insects allows it to exist in sympatry with other insectivorous strepsirrhines through resource partitioning. Adult individuals typically sleep by themselves, with the exception of mothers, who sleep with their infants. Mothers practice infant parking, whereby their offspring are left alone while the parent forages. Social interactions are typically facilitated through indirect communication via urine marking, which accommodates the animal's solitary disposition. The golden angwantibo's usual habitat is the understorey strata of rainforests beneath 5 metres (16 ft) in height, but it is also found on farmland and in treefall gaps. It is known to travel across the ground, and has a specialised defensive posture that can protect it from terrestrial predators.

The golden angwantibo is classified by the International Union for Conservation of Nature Red List as a least-concern species. Threats include hunting for bushmeat and the extraction of body parts for traditional medical practices. The golden angwantibo is possibly the least-studied lorisid, which obscures estimates of the abundance of this species in light of these threats.

== Etymology ==
"Angwantibo" is derived from the Efik language, first used in scientific literature by John Alexander Smith in his 1859 presentation of a description of the Calabar angwantibo to the Royal Physical Society of Edinburgh. The term, relayed to Smith through the writing of Scottish missionary Rev. Alexander Robb, was derived from the Efik word angwán, meaning "farm", and an unknown suffix. An alternative etymology proposed by Smith relates angwán to the Efik word for "cat", which is an onomatopoeia of a cat's vocalisation. Other vernacular names for the species include mese tsere in Fang, koundé in Kota, and sologou in Bekwil. The golden angwantibo is also known as the southern golden potto in English.

== Taxonomy ==
The golden angwantibo is one of two species of the genus Arctocebus, the other being the Calabar angwantibo. Along with the pottos of Perodicticus, angwantibos constitute the subfamily Perodicticinae of the family Lorisidae. The taxonomic status of the golden angwantibo is relatively uninformed by molecular data, as it is likely the least-studied lorisid.

=== Changes in taxonomy ===
The golden angwantibo was described in 1902 by William Edward de Winton in the Journal of Natural History. The holotype, an adult male, was collected "50 miles up the Benito River" in the French Congo by George Latimer Bates in 1901, and was afterwards held in the British Museum. Following Ernst Schwarz's 1931 revision of potto taxonomy, A. aureus was classified as a subspecies of the Calabar angwantibo throughout the remainder of the 20th century. Some scientists, such as Ivan T. Sanderson, dissented from this arrangement and upheld its specific status. Data collected from golden angwantibos during this period were occasionally confounded by a lack of subspecific specification.

In 1913, Oldfield Thomas described a new species of angwantibo, A. ruficeps, based on a juvenile female specimen captured by Bates in Metet, Cameroon earlier that year. Thomas noted that A. ruficeps was "agreeing with [A. aureus] in all points in which it differs from A. calabarensis", and differentiated A. ruficeps from the golden angwantibo on account of its darker pelage. A. ruficeps was later described as synonymous with A. aureus by Schwarz in 1931, who speculated that Thomas' 1913 holotype was an immature golden angwantibo that exhibited darker, subadult pelage.

== Description ==
The golden angwantibo is a medium-sized lorisid, and is the more diminutive of the two angwantibo species. The head-body length is about 22 centimetres (8.7 in), with the skull being 54 millimetres (2.1 in). Its reduced size is a consequence of character displacement due to sympatry with larger, more robust pottos. The average weight between both sexes is 210 grams (7.4 oz). It has a gracile habitus, combining slender limbs with a cylindrical torso and blunted hindquarters. The head is globular, owing to its narrow snout and large eyes. The large premaxillae elongate the snout, constricting the nasal opening into a tubular shape. Compared to the Calabar angwantibo, the muzzle is shorter and narrower, and the interorbital distance is reduced. The permanent dental formula is 2.1.3.32.1.3.3 × 2 = 36, meaning that there are four incisors, two canines, six premolars, and six molars in each side of the mouth. As a lemuriform, the golden angwantibo possesses a toothcomb. The upper incisors (I^{1–2}) are small and peg-like, being about half the size of the canine. The upper anterior premolar (P^{2}) is separated from P^{3} and the upper canine (C^{−}) by diastemata, and has a sharp, caniniform shape. The lower anterior premolar (P_{2}) is similarly caniniform and is longer than the adjacent canine (C_{−}). The third lower molar (M_{3}) has one more cusp than the other molars. The gracility of the mandible is associated with the golden angwantibo's insectivorous diet. The manual digital formula is 4>5>1>3, meaning that the fourth digit is the longest and the third digit is the shortest. The index finger is reduced to a tubercle of two minuscule phalanges. Digit 3 is reduced, and digit 5 is notably smaller than that of the Calabar angwantibo. The thumb is positioned opposite the ulnar digits on the palm. All digits except the thumb are webbed to the first interphalangal joint, with the webbing between manual digit 4 and digit 5 being a skin duplication. The pedal digital formula is 4>3>5>1>2. Pedal digits 3, 4, and 5 are webbed in the same manner as manual digits 4 and 5. The heel is covered in fur, and a grooming claw is present on pedal digit 2. The pedal foot is about 38 millimetres (1.5 in) long. Papillary ridges are absent, and the palms of both the hands and feet have prominent pads. The tail is small, being about 18 millimetres (0.71 in) long, and is covered by a small tuft of stiff dark hairs. The ribs are broad and imbricated, overlapping in a shingle-like formation dorsally. Various explanations for this rib arrangement have been proposed, such as a providing stabilization during suspensory locomotion or protection from predators.

The golden angwantibo lacks a uvula, and its tonsils are enlarged. The stomach is simple and spherical. The large intestines lack sacculations, and there is no distinction between the colon and the rectum. Three pairs of mammae are present. Females have no labia and do not exhibit sexual swelling. The male possesses a "friction pad" on the anterior face of the scrotum that may play a role in copulation. The penis curves distally. The pelage is generally orange with a flocky texture, and is more vibrant than that of the Calabar angwantibo. A white line is present on the nose. The ventral hairs are dull grey at the base and are yellow at the tips. Juveniles have dark pelages that lighten with age. Dark pelage surrounds the orbits, which form eyebrow-like patterns from stiff hairs. The front of the face is otherwise almost hairless.

== Behaviour ==
The golden angwantibo is nocturnal and solitary but social, such that exposure to sunlight can be lethal within an hour. It sleeps during the day in dense tangles of vegetation or in tree forks, and does not build sleeping nests. It has poor eyesight, and is primarily guided by olfaction for hunting and locomotion. The golden angwantibo's longevity in captivity is 4–5 years.

=== Locomotion ===
The golden angwantibo is a slow climber, as it travels with cautious cantilevering movements, relying on branches, lianas, and occasionally the ground to support its weight. Because of its small hands, it can only grasp thin branches and lianas under 4–5 centimetres (1.6–2.0 in) in diameter. It can traverse thicker structures by clinging to the surface with an "embracing" posture, which will suffice for supports thinner than 20 centimetres (7.9 in). As a slow climber, it cannot jump and is therefore constrained to continuous arboreal routes. It travels with smooth, cryptic movements, wherein it always keeps at least two hands connected to its support and never pauses during bouts of locomotion. When no convenient arboreal route is available, the golden angwantibo can descend to the ground and travel terrestrially.

When threatened by predators, the golden angwantibo flees upward in its tree. If it is seized or attacked while it is on the ground, it adopts a characteristic defensive posture, wherein it rolls into a ball with the head tucked between the arms and the mouth held open beneath the arm pits. If it is attacked from behind, the golden angwantibo thrusts its head through its arm pits to bite the assailant. While the defensive posture is assumed, the tail hairs bristle, forming a dark circle that may confuse carnivores, as the head is kept out of sight. This behaviour is likely specialised for defence from terrestrial predators due to the golden angwantibo's proclivity to travel on the ground.

=== Reproduction ===
Courtship between male and female golden angwantibos does not necessarily coincide with copulation, as courtship facilitates the establishment of bonds between individuals that may be formed months before mating occurs. Females can give birth to multiple singleton infants per year, as conception can occur as early as a few days following the birth of an offspring. The gestation period is 131–136 days, and infants are born weighing 24 to 30 grams (0.85 to 1.06 oz). The sex ratio is about even for male and female births. Infants are born with their eyes fully open, and a natal coat of dense fur fully developed. An infant clings to its mother's fur for transportation. As a strepsirrhine, infants are parked while the mother forages. High-pitched "tsie" retrieval vocalisations are produced by parked infants to summon their mothers prior to sunrise. Infants suckle during the daytime while the mother sleeps. Weaning occurs after 100–130 days. After weaning, juveniles will accompany their mothers by following them or by riding on their backs. Juvenile golden angwantibos practice dietary conditioning, wherein they snatch food from their mothers and investigate it, intently tilting their heads as they do so. This is a behaviour that prepares immature individuals for consuming hard-to-process food resources, e.g. caterpillars that could be irritating if not properly prepared. Similarly, early consumption of fruit is accomplished by seizing morsels from the mother. Sexual maturity occurs at about 9–10 months of age.

=== Diet and hunting ===
About 87% of the golden angwantibo's diet consists of animal prey, with the remaining 13% being fruit, with small amounts of wood fibres also being consumed. The golden angwantibo engages in resource partitioning with sympatric insectivorous strepsirrhines such as Prince Demidoff's bushbaby (Galagoides demidovii) by being a specialist consumer of noxious insects that are not sought after by other species, especially caterpillars and beetles. As such, the golden angwantibo occupies an ecological niche typically belonging to predatory or parasitic invertebrates. Small quantities of orthopterans, flies, and ants are also consumed. The golden angwantibo typically hunts by stealthily approaching its prey and grabbing it with its hands. Its lack of a functional index finger increases the breadth of its predatory grasp. It primarily locates prey by scent; captive individuals have been observed to be indifferent towards the sight of prey animals if they cannot smell them. This powerful sense of smell allows the golden angwantibo to hunt in dense foliage, where animals such as caterpillars are typically obscured behind leaves. Caterpillars with irritating hairs are processed using a "massage" behaviour, which entails holding the caterpillar in one's mouth and brushing the hairs off of the insect's body with one's hands before consumption. Afterwards, the hairs are removed from the golden angwantibo's hands by brushing them against the surface of a tree. This massaging behaviour occurs prior to consuming other kinds of insects and caterpillars without irritating hairs; infants even perform this behaviour before they are able to hunt on their own. Almost all sympatric caterpillar species are predated upon by the golden angwantibo. Despite its specialisation for consuming hard-to-process insects, the golden angwantibo prefers easily consumable prey such as moths and orthopterans when available.

=== Social interaction ===
Almost all interactions between golden angwantibos occur indirectly through urine marking, a method of "deferred communication". This is a result of the slow locomotion of the animal, which makes face-to-face encounters infrequent. An exception to this solitary disposition is the mother-offspring relationship; mothers sleep with their infants, whereas adult males and females without infants sleep alone. Compared to other lorisids, golden angwantibos rarely communicate through vocalisations, although some populations are known to create powerful whistling calls. Other seldom-used vocalisations include an aggressive two-toned groaning used during agonistic encounters with conspecifics, and a "wheet" distress call. Agonistic encounters usually involve males competing over territory as a result of the species' equal sex ratio conflicting with the larger sizes of male home ranges. Competing individuals assume aggressive postures, indicated by widely spread ears, gaping mouths, and one hand held aloft as a threat gesture. Submission is indicated by assuming the typical defensive posture taken when threatened by predators.

== Distribution ==
The golden angwantibo is found in localised distributions in Cameroon, the Central African Republic, Equatorial Guinea, Gabon, and the Republic of the Congo. It is possibly present in Angola and the Democratic Republic of the Congo. The Sanaga River forms a biogeographic barrier between it and the Calabar angwantibo's ranges in Cameroon. The other boundaries of the species' range are poorly understood. Golden angwantibos primarily live in rainforests, but can also survive in anthropogenic farmland. The golden angwantibo prefers the understorey strata of rainforests, typically within 5 metres (16 ft) of the ground, and is usually found alongside river banks. It also occurs at the edges of forests and in treefall gaps created by tornados.

The population density is estimated to be 2 individuals/km^{2} in primary forests and 7 individuals/km^{2} in secondary forests. The home ranges of male and female golden angwantibos are affected by different variables; the extent of female home ranges is correlated with the availability and quality of food resources, whereas male home ranges are determined by the distribution of females. Female home ranges may overlap, whereas male home ranges rarely overlap due to direct male-male competition. Pubescent males enter a transient "vagabond" phase after dispersing from their natal ranges before settling down in a permanent home range. Golden angwantibos are otherwise sedentary.

== Conservation status ==
The golden angwantibo is classified as a least-concern species by the International Union for Conservation of Nature Red List. Although it is widespread across its range in central-eastern Africa, it is poorly studied, and its status may be subject to changes in the future as more demographic information becomes available. Known threats to the species include hunting for bushmeat and traditional medicine. The skins of golden angwantibos are used in traditional practices in the Republic of the Congo, and angwantibo hearts are used to ward off misfortune in the Central African Republic. Golden angwantibos can also be killed in traps set for other animals such as duiker.
