= Potto (disambiguation) =

Potto (Perodicticus potto) is a strepsirrhine primate of the family Lorisidae.

Potto may also refer to:

- Potto, North Yorkshire, a village in England
- Potto Brown (1797–1871), an English miller and philanthropist
- Vasily Potto, a Russian lieutenant-general and military historian

== Animals ==
- Golden potto (Arctocebus sp.), two species of strepsirrhine primates
- False potto (Pseudopotto martini), a lorisoid primate of uncertain taxonomic status
- Kinkajou (Potos flavus), a mammal of the family Procyonidae related to coatis and raccoons

== See also ==
- POTO (disambiguation)
- Potoo
- Pottu
