= False potto =

Scientific classification (disputed)
- Kingdom: Animalia
- Phylum: Chordata
- Class: Mammalia
- Infraclass: Placentalia
- Order: Primates
- Suborder: Strepsirrhini
- Family: Lorisidae
- Subfamily: Perodicticinae
- Genus: Pseudopotto; Schwartz, 1996
- Species: P. martini

Binomial name
- Pseudopotto martini Schwartz, 1996

Lorisoid primate of uncertain taxonomic status found in Africa

The false potto (Pseudopotto martini) is a lorisoid primate of uncertain taxonomic status found in Africa. Anthropologist Jeffrey H. Schwartz named it in 1996 as the only species of the genus Pseudopotto on the basis of two specimens (consisting only of skeletal material) that had previously been identified as a potto (Perodicticus). The precise provenances of the two specimens are uncertain, but at least one may have come from Cameroon. Schwartz thought the false potto could even represent a separate family, but other researchers have argued that the supposed distinguishing features of the animal do not actually distinguish it from the potto; specifically, the false potto shares several features with the West African potto (Perodicticus potto).

The false potto generally resembles a small potto, but according to Schwartz it differs in having a longer tail, shorter spines on its neck and chest vertebrae, a smaller, less complex spine on the second neck vertebra, an entepicondylar foramen (an opening in the humerus, or upper arm bone), a lacrimal fossa (a depression in the skull) that is located inside the eye socket, a smaller upper third premolar and molar, and higher-crowned cheekteeth, among other traits. However, many of these traits are variable among pottos; for example, one researcher found entepicondylar foramina in almost half of the specimens in his sample of pottos.

== Taxonomy ==
In a series of potto (Perodicticus potto) skeletons in the collections of the Anthropological Institute and Museum of the University of Zurich at Irchel, anthropologist Jeffrey H. Schwartz recognized two specimens with traits he believed distinct from all pottos, and in 1996 he used these two specimens to describe a new genus and species of primate, Pseudopotto martini. The generic name, Pseudopotto, combines the element pseudo- (Greek for "false") with "potto", referring to superficial similarities between the new form and the potto. The specific name, martini, honors primatologist Robert D. Martin. The exact provenance of the two specimens is unknown, and one is represented by a complete skeleton (but no skin) and the other by a skull only. Schwartz placed both specimens in a single species, but noted that further study might indicate that the two represent distinct species. He thought the relationships of the new form were unknown and difficult to assess and did not assign it to any family, but provisionally placed it closest to the family Lorisidae, together with the potto, the angwantibos, and the lorises. The discovery, published in the Anthropological Papers of the American Museum of Natural History, was featured in Scientific American and Science; the Science account noted that Schwartz thought Pseudopotto may represent a new family of primates.

In 1998, the journal African Primates published three papers by primatologists on the false potto. Colin Groves affirmed that it was probably distinct from the potto and Simon Bearder cited it as an example of unrecognized taxonomic diversity in lorisids, but Esteban Sarmiento compared the new taxon to specimens of the potto and found that the alleged distinctive traits of the false potto in fact fell within the range of variation of the potto, and that the false potto was probably not even a species distinct from Perodicticus potto. In 2000, primatologist B.S. Leon agreed that the false potto was not distinct from the subspecies Perodicticus potto potto, but noted that various forms of potto were distinct enough from each other that there may indeed be more than one species of potto. Opinions since then have been divided: a 2003 compilation of African primate diversity concluded that there was insufficient evidence that the false potto is a distinct species, the primate chapter of the 2005 third edition of Mammal Species of the World, written by Groves, listed Pseudopotto as a genus but noted that it was "controversial"; and Schwartz continued to recognize the false potto as a genus in 2005. Also in 2005, primatologist David Stump reviewed some of the distinguishing features of Pseudopotto in the context of studying variation among pottos, and found that some but not all of the false potto's traits were found in some pottos, mainly western populations (subspecies potto).

== Description ==
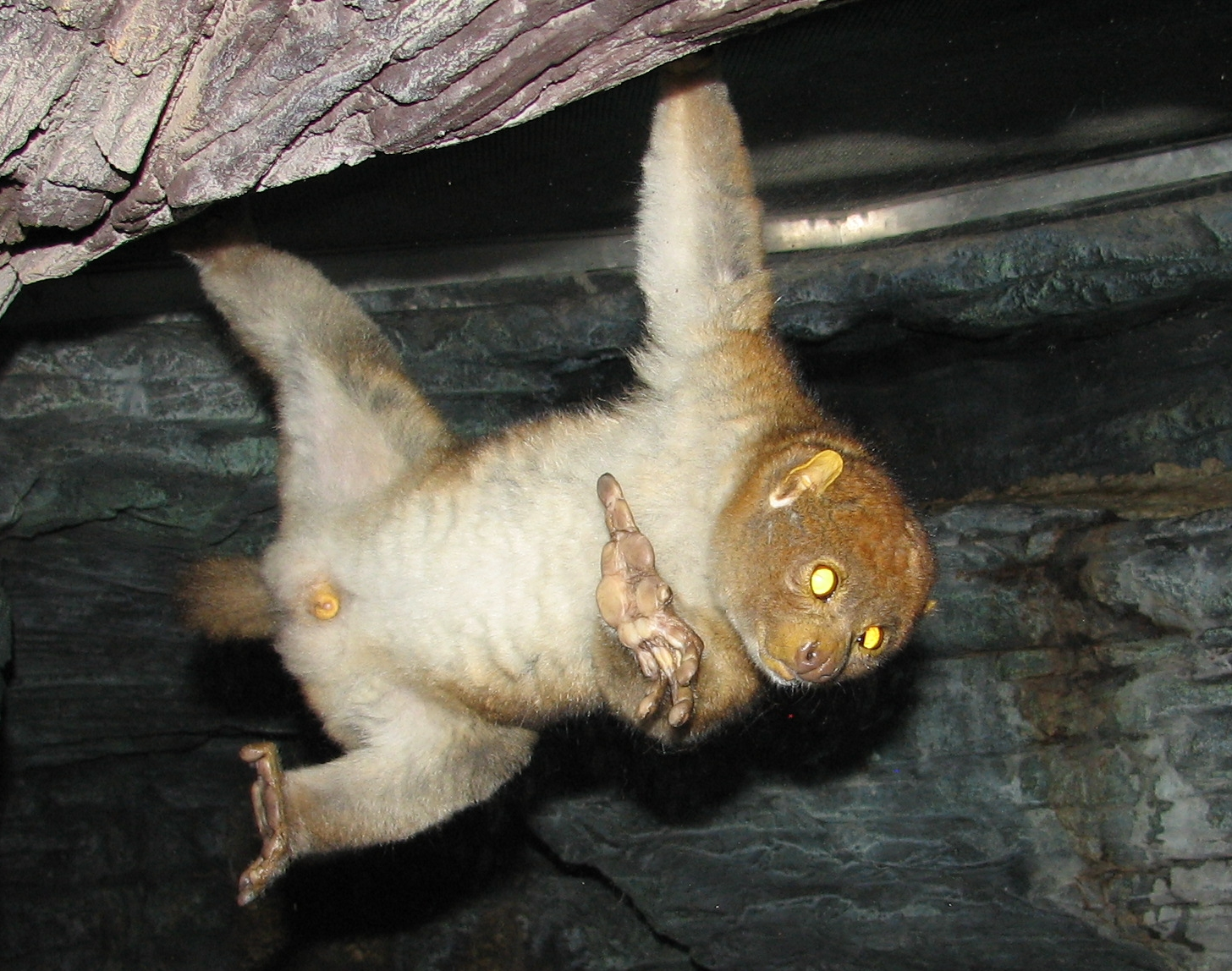
The potto (genus Perodicticus, pictured) is quite similar to the false potto and may represent the same species.

One of the specimens, AMZ 6698, is an adult female that lived in Zürich Zoo. It is represented by a virtually complete skeleton, but the skin was not preserved. According to Schwartz, the skeleton shows signs of osteoporosis and periodontitis (common in zoo animals), but not of other pathologies or abnormalities. The right teeth were removed before Schwartz studied the specimen. Schwartz selected this specimen as the holotype. The other specimen, AMZ-AS 1730, is a subadult male collected in the wild, of which only the skull, including the mandible (lower jaw), was preserved. The dentition includes both permanent and deciduous teeth. Specimens of Pseudopotto are at least superficially similar to pottos, but according to Schwartz, they differ in a number of traits. Among lorisids, Schwartz saw similarities between the false potto and true pottos as well as angwantibos and slow lorises (Nycticebus). The false potto is comparable in size to the smallest pottos, but falls within their range of metrical variation; small size is also seen in western pottos.

The tail, according to Schwartz, is longer than in the potto. He does not provide measurements of the tail of AMZ 6698 and notes that at least one vertebra is missing, but Sarmiento counted 11 caudal vertebrae in an illustration of AMZ 6698 and Groves counted at least 15. However, Sarmiento found that the number of caudal vertebrae ranges from 5 to 17, with an average of 11, in pottos. Relatively long tails are also common in the western form of the potto, though according to Stump the tail of Pseudopotto is longer than any seen in pottos. The false potto allegedly has shorter spines on its cervical (neck) and first and second thoracic (chest) vertebrae, but Leon notes that this feature is also seen in western pottos. Schwartz writes that the false potto differs from pottos and angwantibos in lacking a bifid (two-tipped) spine on the second cervical vertebra, but Sarmiento found this feature in 3 out of 11 potto specimens he examined.

The ulnar styloid process (a projection on the ulna, one of the bones of the forearm, where it meets the wrist) is not as hooked as in other lorisids, according to Schwartz, which Groves suggests may indicate that the wrist is more mobile. Another alleged diagnostic feature is the presence of an entepicondylar foramen (an opening near the distal, or far, end of the bone) on the humerus (upper arm bone); however, Sarmiento found this feature in 4 out of 11 specimens, and on one side of a fifth, and Stump noted that the foramen occurred in specimens from across the potto's range.

The lacrimal fossa, a depression in the skull, is located on the upper surface of the skull in most lorisids, but Schwartz found that it was further to the back, inside the orbit (eye socket) in the false potto and the slow loris. Sarmiento found this feature in 3 out of 11 pottos examined. The coronoid process of the mandible is said to be more hooked in the false potto than in the potto and slow loris.

Other distinguishing features of the false potto are in the dentition. Sarmiento notes, however, that captive specimens may develop abnormalities in the teeth and that some dental characters Schwartz uses are quite variable, sometimes even from one side of the same individual to another. The third upper molar (M3) is more reduced in the false potto than in any other prosimian, according to Schwartz, but Leon notes that western pottos also have a relatively small M3. The third upper premolar (P3) is also reduced, resembling the condition in the fork-marked lemurs (Phaner). Stump writes that small P3s are also common in western pottos, although the false potto's P3 is shaped differently. Groves notes that P1 is quite long, another point of similarity with the fork-marked lemurs. The lower premolars are compressed laterally in Pseudopotto, the cusps on the cheekteeth are higher, and the cristid obliqua (a crest connected to the protoconid cusp) is at a relatively buccal position (in the direction of the cheeks).

In AMZ 6698, skull length is 59.30 mm (2.335 in) and length of the right humerus is 57.65 mm (2.270 in).

== Distribution and status ==
According to records in the Anthropological Institute and Museum, AMZ 6698, the holotype, is from "Equatorial Africa", and AMZ-AS 1730 is from the "Cameroons". According to mammalogist Ronald Nowak, these designations imply that the latter came either from modern Cameroon or far eastern Nigeria (British Cameroons) and the former from Cameroon or a neighboring state. In 1999, Simon Bearder claimed, citing a personal communication by C. Wild, that Pseudopotto had been seen in the wild and in 2001, ornithologist Christopher Bowden noted the occurrence of Pseudopotto on Mount Kupe in Cameroon, also citing C. Wild. However, the IUCN Red List notes that while sightings of the false potto at 820 to 940 m (2,690 to 3,084 ft) on Mount Kupe had been reported, surveys had failed to confirm its occurrence there, though pottos, some with long tails, had been found. The false potto was formerly included under the potto in the Red List, however, as of October 2021, it is treated as a synonym of the Central African potto (Perodictitus edwardsi) due to the evidence that it is a distinct species being considered insufficient. The American Society of Mammalogists instead synonymizes it with the West African potto (P. potto).
