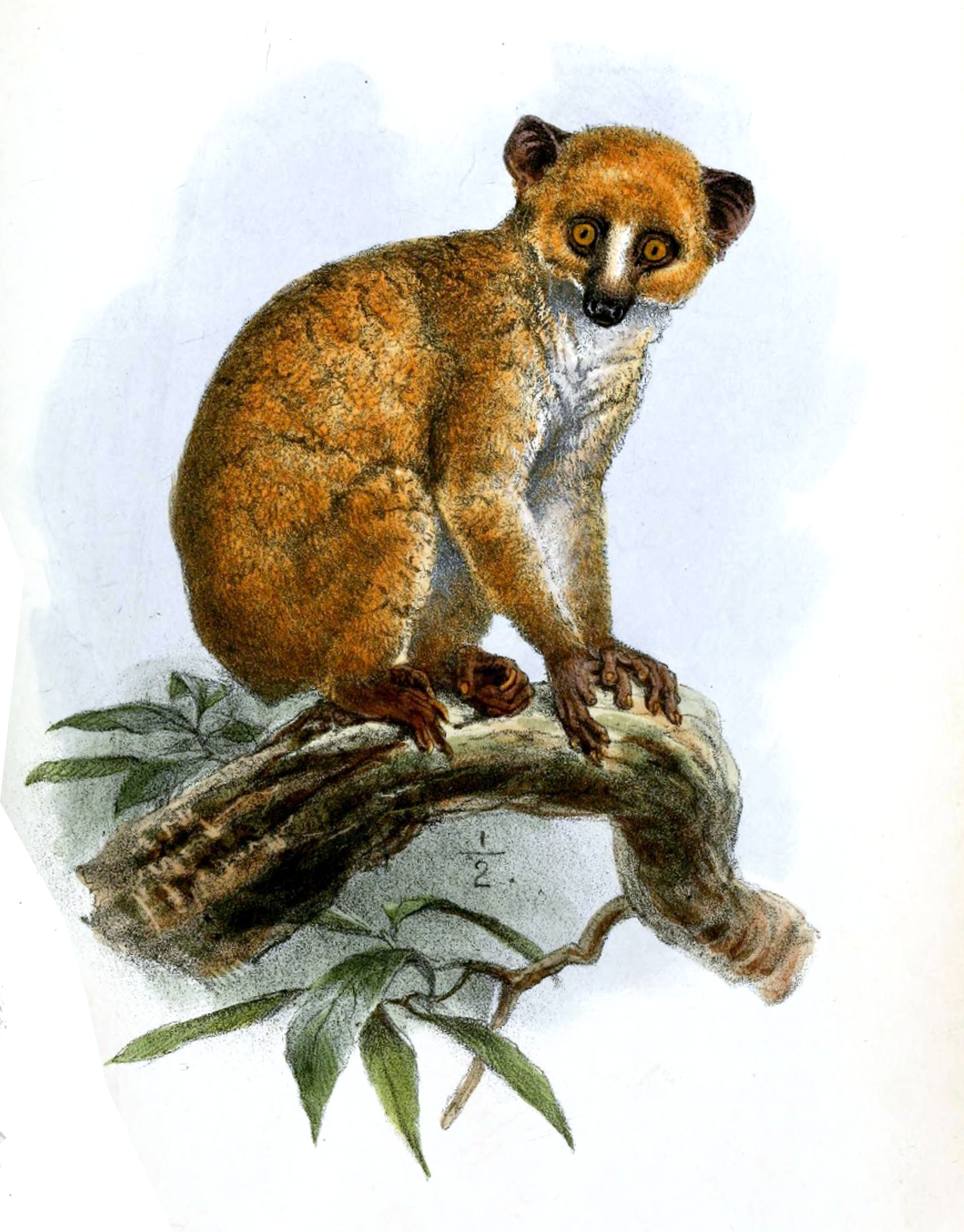

Conservation status
- Near Threatened (IUCN 3.1)

Scientific classification
- Kingdom: Animalia
- Phylum: Chordata
- Class: Mammalia
- Infraclass: Placentalia
- Order: Primates
- Suborder: Strepsirrhini
- Family: Lorisidae
- Genus: Arctocebus
- Species: A. calabarensis

Binomial name
- Arctocebus calabarensis (Smith, 1860)
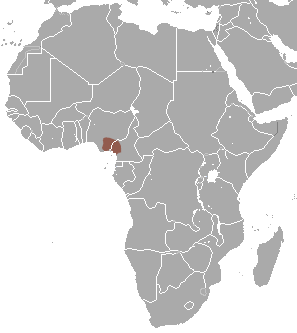
- Calabar angwantibo range

= Calabar angwantibo =

Species of mammal

The Calabar angwantibo (Arctocebus calabarensis), also known as the Calabar potto, is a strepsirrhine primate of the family Lorisidae. It shares the genus Arctocebus with the golden angwantibo (Arctocebus aureus). It is closely related to the potto (Perodicticus potto) and to the various lorises.

== Habitat and distribution ==
The Calabar angwantibo lives in the rainforests of west Africa, particularly in tree-fall zones. In areas where the forest has been cleared, it has been known to live on farmland. Its range covers Cameroon, Nigeria and Equatorial Guinea.

The species takes its name from the Nigerian city of Calabar.

== Physiology ==
The Calabar angwantibo weighs between 266 and 465 grams. It has orangish-yellow fur on its back, grey or white fur on its belly, and a distinctive white line on its forehead and nose. Like other lorids, this angwantibo has a very short index finger, which allows it to get a strong grip on tree branches. The second toe on each foot has a specialised claw that the angwantibo uses for grooming. The Calabar angwantibo is the only primate to have a functioning nictitating membrane (third eyelid).

== Behavior ==
The Calabar angwantibo is nocturnal and arboreal. It stays considerably lower in the trees than the other nocturnal strepsirrhines in its range, and is typically found between 5 and 15 metres above ground. It moves by climbing very slowly through the trees, always grasping branches with at least three of its limbs at a time. During the day the angwantibo sleeps under dense foliage, hanging from a branch.

The Calabar angwantibo's diet consists mainly of insects, especially caterpillars, but it also eats some fruit. It will eat strong-smelling insects that other animals reject. Before eating a caterpillar, the angwantibo wipes it carefully with its hands to remove any poisonous barbs.

When confronted by a predator, the Calabar angwantibo will roll up into a ball, but keep its mouth open beneath its armpit. If the attacker persists, the angwantibo will bite it and not let go.

Calabar angwantibos forage for food alone, but each male's territory overlaps that of several females. Angwantibos reinforce social bonds through mutual grooming and scent-marking. Mating takes place only in the final phase of the female's estrous cycle, and is performed hanging upside-down from a branch. The female gives birth to a single infant after a gestation period of 131 to 136 days; the young are normally born between January and April. Infants are born with their eyes open and can cling to their mother's fur right away.

== In literature ==
The Calabar angwantibo, along with its close relative the potto, makes an appearance in Patrick O'Brian's Aubrey–Maturin novels. Stephen Maturin acquires a Calabar angwantibo on his travels and becomes 'absurdly attached' to it.

The search for an angwantibo is also a minor focus of Gerald Durrell's first book, The Overloaded Ark.
