= POTO =

Poto or POTO may refer to:

- The Phantom of the Opera (novel) a 1910 novel by French writer Gaston Leroux
- "Planet of the Ood", an episode of the British science fiction television series Doctor Who
- Poto dialect of the Losengo language, spoken in the Democratic Republic of the Congo

== People ==
- Poto the Brave (fl. 1060), Bavarian count palatine
- Alicia Poto (born 1978), Australian basketball player
- Mike Poto (born 1981), Zambian football goalkeeper
- Poto Williams (born 1962), New Zealand member of Parliament
- Poto and Cabengo (born 1970), American twin girls who used an invented language, subjects of a 1980 documentary film

== See also ==
- Potos, a genus of mammals known as kinkajou or honey bear
- Poto Poto, a 1994 puzzle arcade game
- Potto (disambiguation)
