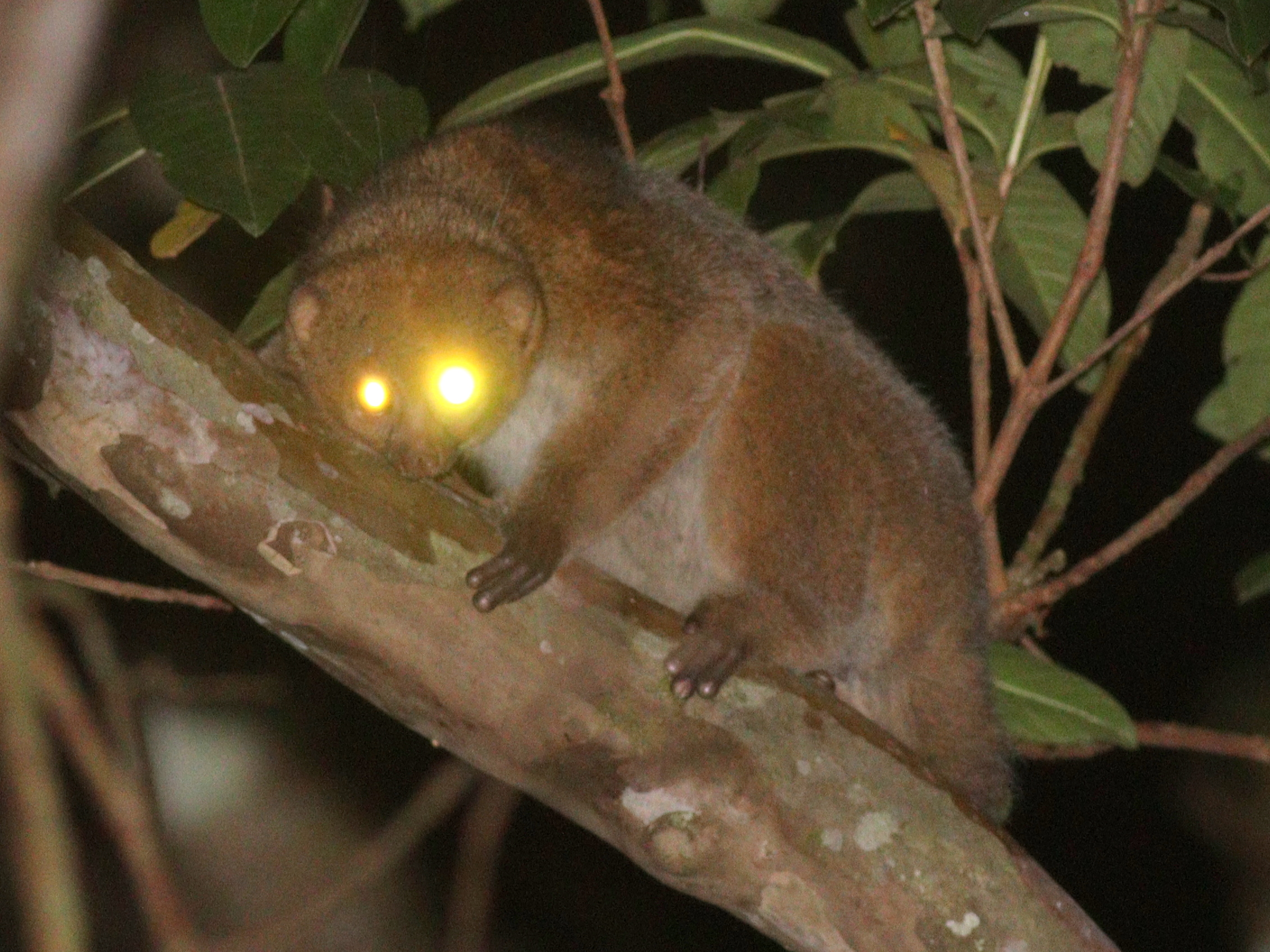

Conservation status
- Least Concern (IUCN 3.1)

Scientific classification
- Kingdom: Animalia
- Phylum: Chordata
- Class: Mammalia
- Infraclass: Placentalia
- Order: Primates
- Suborder: Strepsirrhini
- Family: Lorisidae
- Genus: Perodicticus
- Species: P. ibeanus

Binomial name
- Perodicticus ibeanus Thomas, 1910

Subspecies
- P. i. ibeanus Thomas, 1910; P. i. stockleyi Butynski & De Jong, 2007

Synonyms
- Perodicticus potto ibeanus Thomas, 1910

= East African potto =

Species of primate

The East African potto (Perodicticus ibeanus) is a species of nocturnal strepsirrhine primate. It is found in Central and East Africa.

== Taxonomy ==
It was formerly considered a subspecies of the West African potto (Perodicticus potto), but a 2015 study split it into three species, and classified P. ibeanus as a distinct species. It is thought to be the sister species to the Central African potto (Perodicticus ibeanus), from which it diverged during the late Miocene, about 5.5 million years ago.

There are two subspecies: the type subspecies P. i. ibeanus and the possibly extinct Mount Kenya potto (P. i. stockleyi), known only from a single specimen collected in 1938.

== Distribution ==
This species ranges from the Central African Republic and the Democratic Republic of the Congo east to western Kenya. In addition, an isolated subspecies (P. i. stockleyi) is endemic to the slopes of Mount Kenya, making it the easternmost population of any potto.

== Conservation ==
This species is considered Least Concern by the IUCN Red List and is known to be an adaptable species, being found in both undisturbed and disturbed forests, even near human populations. However, localized declines may be taking place due to deforestation for agriculture. In addition, the Mount Kenya subspecies is thought to be either extinct or very nearly so due to the clearance of most of its habitat, with less than 50 remaining individuals if it is still extant; due to this, it is classified as Critically Endangered (Possibly Extinct) by the IUCN.
