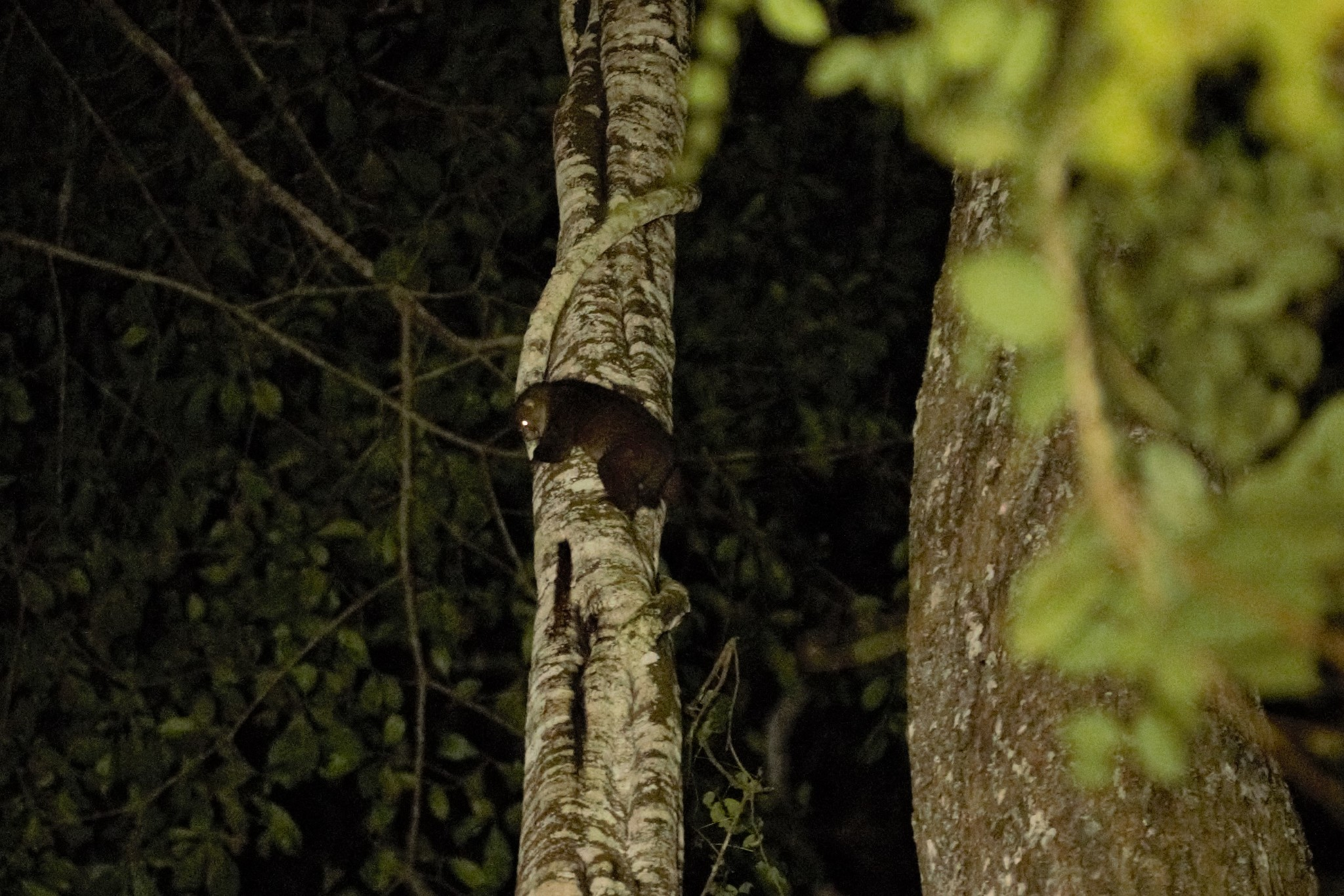

Conservation status
- Least Concern (IUCN 3.1)

Scientific classification
- Kingdom: Animalia
- Phylum: Chordata
- Class: Mammalia
- Order: Primates
- Suborder: Strepsirrhini
- Family: Lorisidae
- Genus: Perodicticus
- Species: P. edwardsi

Binomial name
- Perodicticus edwardsi Bouvier, 1879

Synonyms
- Perodicticus potto edwardsi; Pseudopotto martini? Schwartz, 1996

= Central African potto =

Species of primate

The Central African potto (Perodicticus edwardsi) is a species of nocturnal strepsirrhine primate. It is found in Central Africa. It is also known as Milne-Edwards's potto, after Alphonse Milne-Edwards.

== Taxonomy ==
It was formerly considered a subspecies of Perodicticus potto (now the West African potto), but a 2015 study split it into three species, and classified P. edwardsi as a distinct species. It is thought to be the sister species to the East African potto (Perodicticus ibeanus), from which it diverged during the late Miocene, about 5.5 million years ago.

The IUCN Red List considers to the mysterious "false potto" (Pseudopotto martini) to be a misidentified specimen of an East African potto, based on the rumored provenance of the individual being from Cameroon. In contrast, the American Society of Mammalogists considers the false potto to be a misidentified P. potto.

== Distribution ==
This species ranges from Nigeria east to the Central African Republic and Democratic Republic of the Congo, and south to Angola. The Niger River serves as the western boundary of the species' range, separating it from the West African potto.

== Conservation ==
This species is considered Least Concern by the IUCN Red List and is known to be an adaptable species, being found in both undisturbed and disturbed forests, even near human populations. However, localized declines may be taking place due to deforestation for agriculture and collection for the bushmeat trade.
