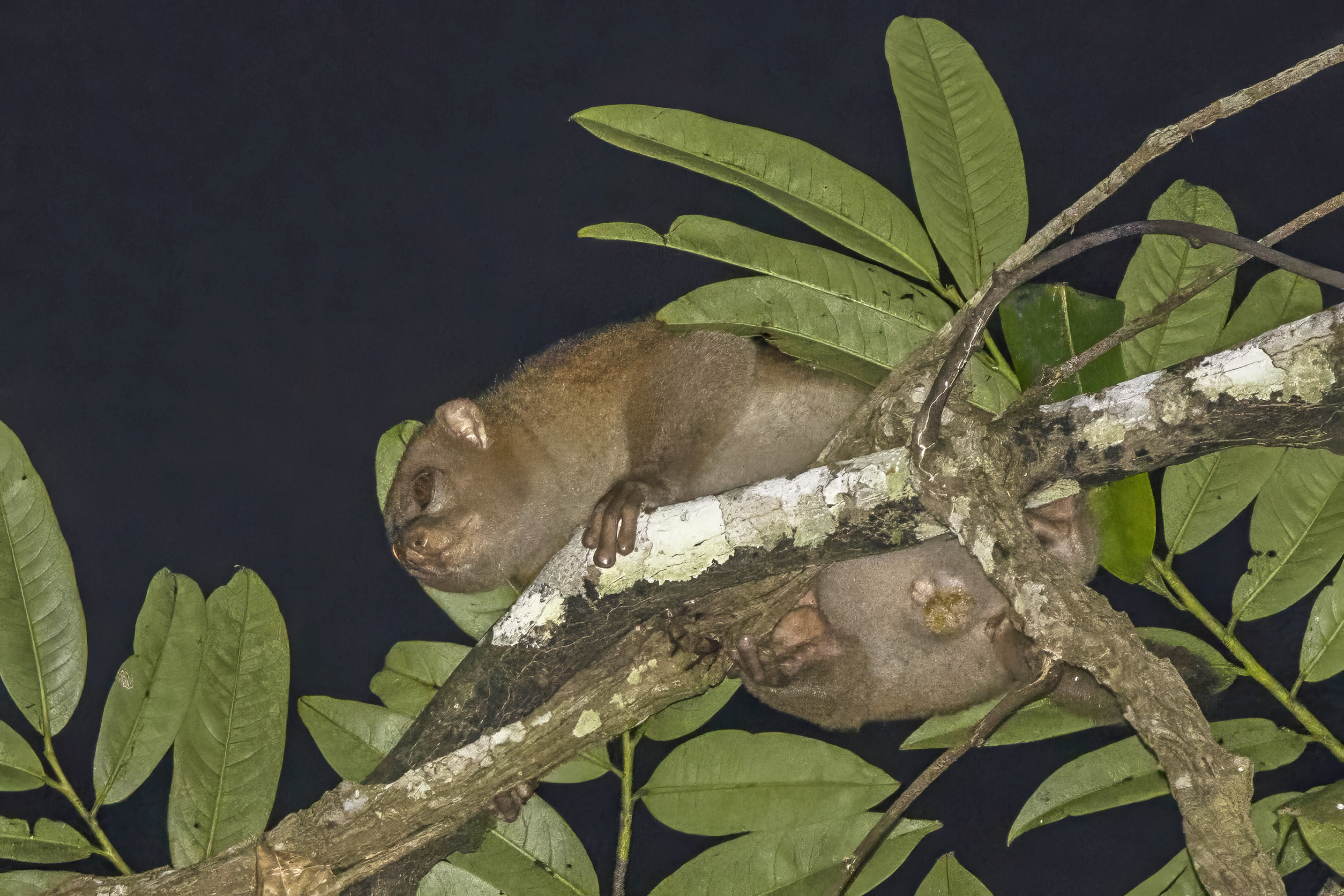
- In Ghana
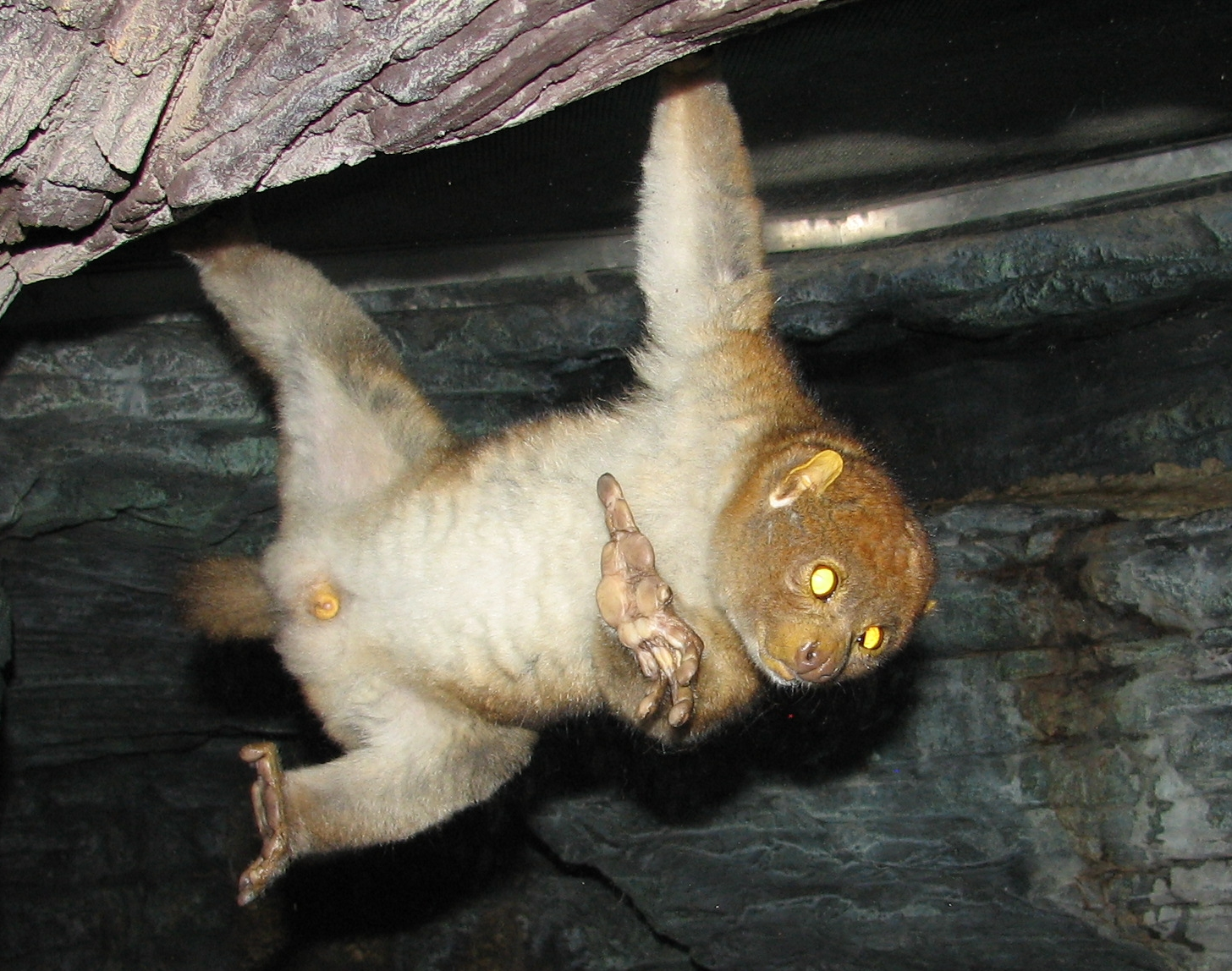
- In Cincinnati Zoo

Conservation status
- Near Threatened (IUCN 3.1)

Scientific classification
- Kingdom: Animalia
- Phylum: Chordata
- Class: Mammalia
- Infraclass: Placentalia
- Order: Primates
- Suborder: Strepsirrhini
- Family: Lorisidae
- Genus: Perodicticus
- Species: P. potto

Binomial name
- Perodicticus potto (Müller, 1766)

Subspecies
- P. p. potto Müller, 1776; P. p. juju Thomas, 1910

Synonyms
- Pseudopotto martini? Schwartz, 1996

= West African potto =

Species of primate

The West African potto (Perodicticus potto) is a species of nocturnal strepsirrhine primate. It is found in tropical West Africa. It is also known as Bosman's potto, after Willem Bosman, who described the species in 1704. It is the type species of the genus Perodicticus.

== Taxonomy ==
This species was formerly considered the only species in the genus Perodicticus, but a 2015 study split it into three species, with only the name Perodicticus potto only applying to the West African population.

Within the West African potto group (Perodicticus potto), current taxonomy recognizes two main subspecies:

- Perodicticus potto potto: The nominate subspecies. It inhabits the rainforests of West Africa, from Guinea and Sierra Leone to Ghana.
- Perodicticus potto juju (Benin potto): Proposed as a subspecies found east of the Volta River in Ghana. Some experts suggest it could also merit separate species status due to its cranial and dental variations.

Phylogenetic evidence supports the West African potto being the most basal member of the genus Perodicticus, with the other two species being sister species to one another. It is thought to have diverged from the other species during the mid-late Miocene, between 6-10 million years ago.

The mysterious "false potto" (Pseudopotto martini) is now thought to have been a misidentified specimen of West African potto.

== Distribution ==
This species ranges from Guinea west to Nigeria, with an disjunct population in eastern Senegal. The Niger River serves as the eastern barrier to the species' range, separating it from the Central African potto (P. edwardsi).

== Ecology ==
One population of chimpanzees living in Mont Assirik, Senegal, was observed to eat West African pottos, taking them from their sleeping places during the day; however, this behaviour has not been observed in chimps elsewhere.

== Conservation ==
Although this species is known to survive in disturbed forests near human habitation, population growth and subsequent habitat destruction in West Africa are of major risk to the species. Heavy deforestation for industrial agriculture is thought to have led to rapid population declines in the species. In addition, this species is more frequently hunted for bushmeat due to a decline in larger animals to hunt, which has in turn also caused pottos to become rarer. Due to this, it is classified as Near Threatened on the IUCN Red List.
