= Ursula Cowgill =

American anthropologist, biologist, and chemist

Ursula Moser Cowgill (9 November 1927 – November 27, 2015) was a biologist and anthropologist who worked for Yale University, Dow Chemical Company and the University of Colorado during the second half of the 20th century. Her work includes studies of agricultural practices in pre-Columbian Mesoamerica, seasons of birth in human beings, the relationship between cultural gender bias and infant mortality, and the possible role of selenium in reducing mortality from AIDS. She also looked after four pottos for many years and published a series of observations on their behaviour.

Cowgill earned a PhD from Iowa State University in 1956. Later she worked as an analytical chemist for the limnologist G. Evelyn Hutchinson. Her first journal articles, some published jointly with Hutchinson, appeared in the early 1960s.

Cowgill was living in Colorado as of 2003. In addition to her scientific research, she was an activist with the American Civil Liberties Union.

== Career ==
=== Maya agriculture ===
Between 1961 and 1963, Cowgill and Hutchinson made studies of soil in the Petén Basin, Guatemala, with the aim of learning about the effects of agricultural practices of the pre-Columbian Maya civilization. Their findings reported that Maya cultivation methods had gradually robbed the soil of vital elements, meaning that it eventually became unable to sustain crops. Some scholars have linked this exhaustion of the soil to the 10th-century decline of the Maya urban settlements in the Petén region.

=== Sex ratio and childhood mortality ===
Cowgill's research into gender and child mortality covered both historical records in England and contemporary observations in Guatemala. Using birth and death records from the parish registers of York between 1538 and 1812, Cowgill found that throughout the city's history, girls at every stage of childhood had died at a higher rate than boys of the same age. This resulted in an adult sex ratio of 136 males for every 100 females. Cowgill theorised that this was partly because girls were more likely to be victims of infanticide, and partly because sons tended to receive better feeding and care than daughters.

In Guatemala, Cowgill studied an indigenous village where the sex ratio was even more skewed—178:100. Cowgill observed that mothers in this village breastfed sons for much longer than daughters, and tended to give them preferential treatment even after weaning. Cowgill and Hutchinson also speculated that the sexually provocative behaviour of young girls in this village might be a survival mechanism.

== Publications ==
- Cowgill, U. M.; Bishop, A.; Andrew, R. J.; Hutchinson, G. E. (1962). "An Apparent Lunar Periodicity in the Sexual Cycle of Certain Prosimians". Proceedings of the National Academy of Sciences of the United States of America. 48 (2): 238–41. Bibcode:1962PNAS...48..238C. doi:10.1073/pnas.48.2.238. JSTOR 71188. PMC 220764. PMID 16590923.
- Bajo de Santa Fe (with G.E. Hutchinson). Book, 1963.
- Cowgill, UM; Hutchinson, GE (1963). "Sex-ratio in childhood and the depopulation of the Peten, Guatemala". Human Biology. 35: 90–103. PMID 14023537.
- Cowgill, U. M. (1966). "Season of Birth in Man. Contemporary Situation with Special Reference to Europe and the Southern Hemisphere". Ecology. 47 (4): 614–623. doi:10.2307/1933939. JSTOR 1933939.
- The history of Laguna de Petenxil, a small lake in Northern Guatemala. Book, 1966.
- Cowgill, UM (1967). "Heat transfer solely by molecular conduction in the metalimnion". Proceedings of the National Academy of Sciences of the United States of America. 57 (2): 198–200. Bibcode:1967PNAS...57..198C. doi:10.1073/pnas.57.2.198. PMC 335487. PMID 16591451.
- Cowgill, UM (1977). "A myeloliposarcoma in a female Perodicticus potto: Mineralogical and elemental chemical analysis". Journal of Medical Primatology. 6 (2): 114–8. doi:10.1159/000459730. PMID 406401.
- Cowgill, UM (1977). "Elemental analysis of a tumor from a nocturnal prosimian with special emphasis on bromine". The Science of the Total Environment. 7 (1): 63–9. Bibcode:1977ScTEn...7...63C. doi:10.1016/0048-9697(77)90017-1. PMID 402025.
- Cowgill, UM; Zeman, LB (1980). "Normal blood values of an adult male Perodicticus potto with comparative data from other primates". Folia Primatologica. 33 (4): 273–90. doi:10.1159/000155942. PMID 7419137.
- Cowgill, UM (1988). "The tellurium content of vegetation". Biological Trace Element Research. 17: 43–67. doi:10.1007/BF02795446. PMID 2484368. S2CID 10819388.
- Aquatic toxicology and hazard assessment, 12th volume (with Llewellyn R. Williams). Book, 1989.
- Cowgill, UM; Milazzo, DP; Landenberger, BD (1990). "The reproducibility of the three brood Ceriodaphnia test using the reference toxicant sodium lauryl sulfate". Archives of Environmental Contamination and Toxicology. 19 (4): 513–7. doi:10.1007/BF01059069. PMID 2386407. S2CID 29347853.
- Cowgill, UM; Milazzo, DP (1991). "The response of the three brood Ceriodaphnia test to fifteen formulations and pure compounds in common use". Archives of Environmental Contamination and Toxicology. 21 (1): 35–40. doi:10.1007/BF01055553. PMID 1898115. S2CID 34093998.
- Cowgill, UM (1991). "Variation in the nitrotoxin concentration of 13 species of Astragalus (Fabaceae) over a 6-year period". Biological Trace Element Research. 31 (2): 111–8. doi:10.1007/BF02990419. PMID 9438032. S2CID 1400765.
- Cowgill, UM (1997). "The distribution of selenium and mortality owing to acquired immune deficiency syndrome in the continental United States". Biological Trace Element Research. 56 (1): 43–61. doi:10.1007/BF02778983. PMID 9152511. S2CID 11350156.
