= Poto Poto =

1994 video game

Poto Poto is a puzzle arcade game created by Sega of Japan in 1994. It was built on the Sega System C2.

== Gameplay ==
Either one player against the computer or two human players manage a pushcart full of hexagonal tiles. Tiles fall out of your basket and slide down the board of other tiles to match up with the end of your structure in a honeycomb fashion. If pieces that support lower pieces break, the entire hanging structure breaks. Breaking tiles in groups of three is a good thing which awards points. The goal is to keep your board fairly clear while hoping that your opponent makes enough mistakes to touch the bottom and lose.

== Reception ==
In Japan, Game Machine listed Poto Poto on their May 15, 1994 issue as being the tenth most-successful table arcade unit of the month.
