= Treefall gap =

Ecological feature

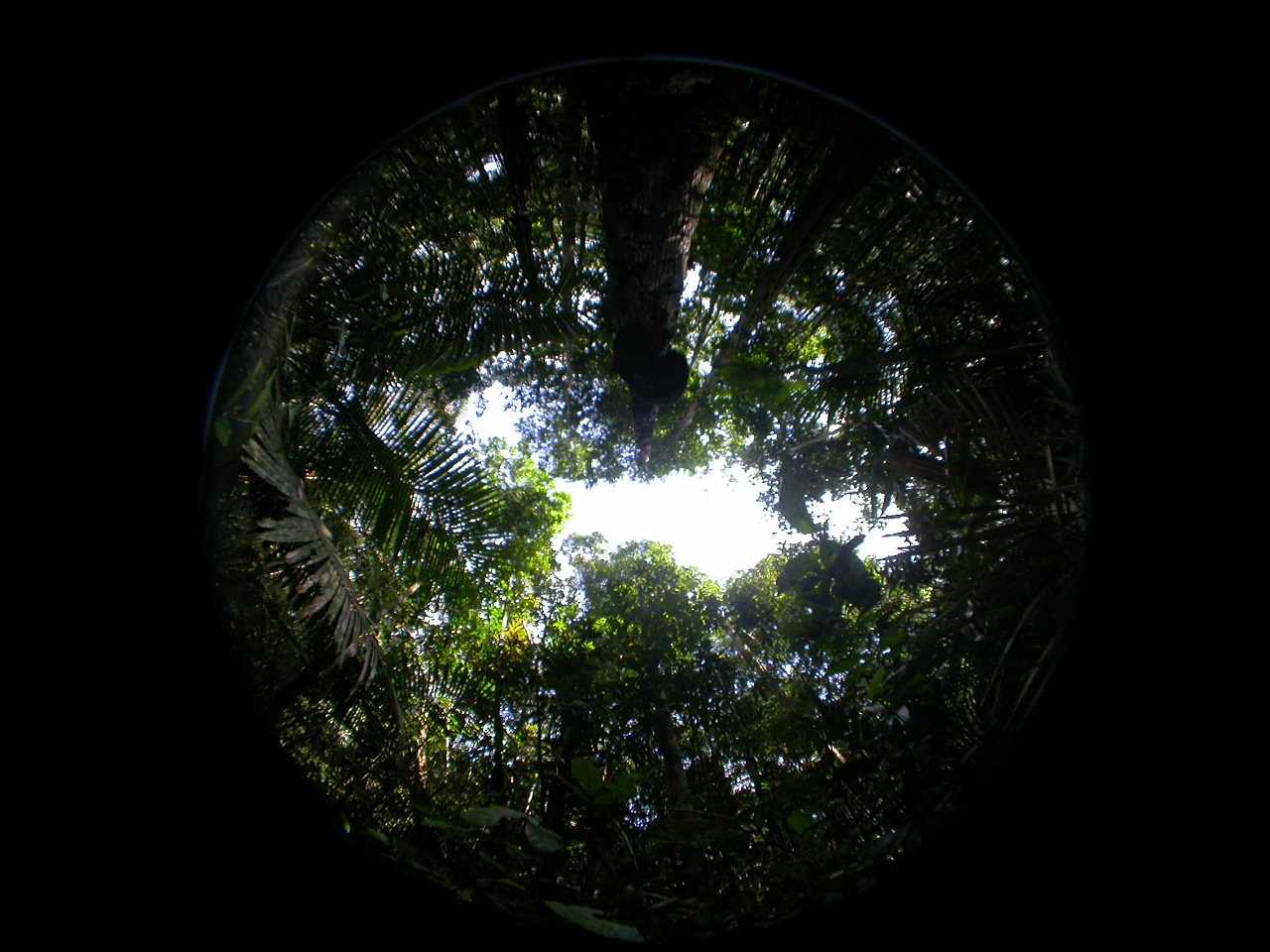
Treefall Gap

A treefall gap is a distinguishable hole in the canopy of a forest with vertical sides extending through all levels down to an average height of 2 m (6.6 ft) above ground. These holes occur as result of a fallen tree or large limb. The initial definition used two metres as it was proposed that "a regrowth height of 2m was sufficient" for a gap to be considered closed, but not all scientists agree. For example, Runkle proposed that regrowth should be 10–20 m (33–66 ft) above the ground. Alternatively, a treefall gap is "the smallest gap [that must] be readily distinguishable amid the complexity of forest structure."

There is no upper limit in gap size. However, the creation of the space must be caused by a tree or a large limb. For example, a field would not be considered a treefall gap. Tree falls are commonly caused by old age, natural hazards, or parasitic plants (or certain epiphytes).

== Measurement ==
Scientists have not been able to come to a conclusion on one absolute method for measuring a treefall gap. However, there are two types of measurements that are commonly used:

Two-dimensional

This method does not necessarily take into account irregularity in gap shapes. Most gaps do not conform to one particular shape, so assumptions must be made. Gaps that are uniformly shaped (e.g. ellipse, triangle, etc.) can be quantified by measuring the length and width of each gap. Commonly, however, the gap is irregularly shaped and must be divided into smaller sections to be measured individually in order to obtain higher accuracy.

Three-dimensional

This method provides a more accurate measurement as it takes into account differences in structure of the gap descending from the canopy to the forest floor. One of the most recent strategies, pioneered by K. and S.I. Yamamoto, "utilized two photographs of the canopy gap, taken at different heights, and a series of geometric calculations to calculate the gap area." By doing this, the scientists were able to obtain a more accurate measurement as they are now accounting for differences in structure around the periphery of the gap.

== Gap regeneration ==
Recovery time can be rapid (5–7meters per year) or much slower depending upon the vegetation present in the gap. Sometimes, vegetation can impede growth, as with lianas in tropical forests. Gap-phase regeneration is not completed until the intact canopy's height is met by new growth.

1. Seed: soil contains a number of seeds (seed bank) that are ready to sprout once they receive sunlight as a result of the gap formed in the canopy.
2. Advanced regeneration: young plants that were originally present prior to the tree fall will quickly grow after being exposed to additional sunlight.
3. Vegetative reproduction: As the tree falls, it will pull other vegetation with it that can begin to reproduce within the newly formed gap. This is especially true for Lianas (see Alternative Pathway of Regeneration below).
4. Spreading laterally into the gap from the surrounding forest.

=== Effects of liana in tropical forests ===
Lianas are a common woody vine found in tropical forests. These vines utilize trees to venture into the canopy in search of sunlight and nutrients. Thus, when a tree falls, it brings all the liana growth with it. Following a tree fall, lianas have a high survival rate (~90%) and they can quickly begin sprouting. This causes potential problems as new trees begin to grow but are unable or are limited by the presence of lianas. Many gaps have been found to enter a state where growth has been halted because of lianas. Therefore, scientists have begun looking into their effects on gap regeneration.

A study conducted on Barro Colorado Island found that lianas play a likely role in slowing gap-regeneration time. Lianas have been able to keep a gap in a low-canopy state, and this is especially true for gaps that are at least 13 years old. Further studies by Schnitzer et al. have shown that as lianas increase in density, species richness and pioneer tree density decrease for all gaps (i.e. low and high canopy gaps). This data suggests that lianas play a significant role in gap-regeneration time.

== Intermediate disturbance hypothesis and species abundance ==
Treefall gaps are important in maintenance of some plant species diversity. Disturbance is important in tropics as a mechanism for maintaining diversity. According to the intermediate disturbance hypothesis (IDH), some disturbance is critical and the maximum number of species will be found where the "frequency and intensity" of disturbances are at an intermediate scale. IDH helps explain the Gap Hypothesis which postulates that more light and more diverse resources caused by the falling of a canopy tree may aid in more species abundance. Although treefall gaps have been shown to promote species diversity among a variety of species, a gap's effect on different species is likely to produce mixed results (i.e. some species will experience more diversity because of gaps while others will not).

== Light penetration ==
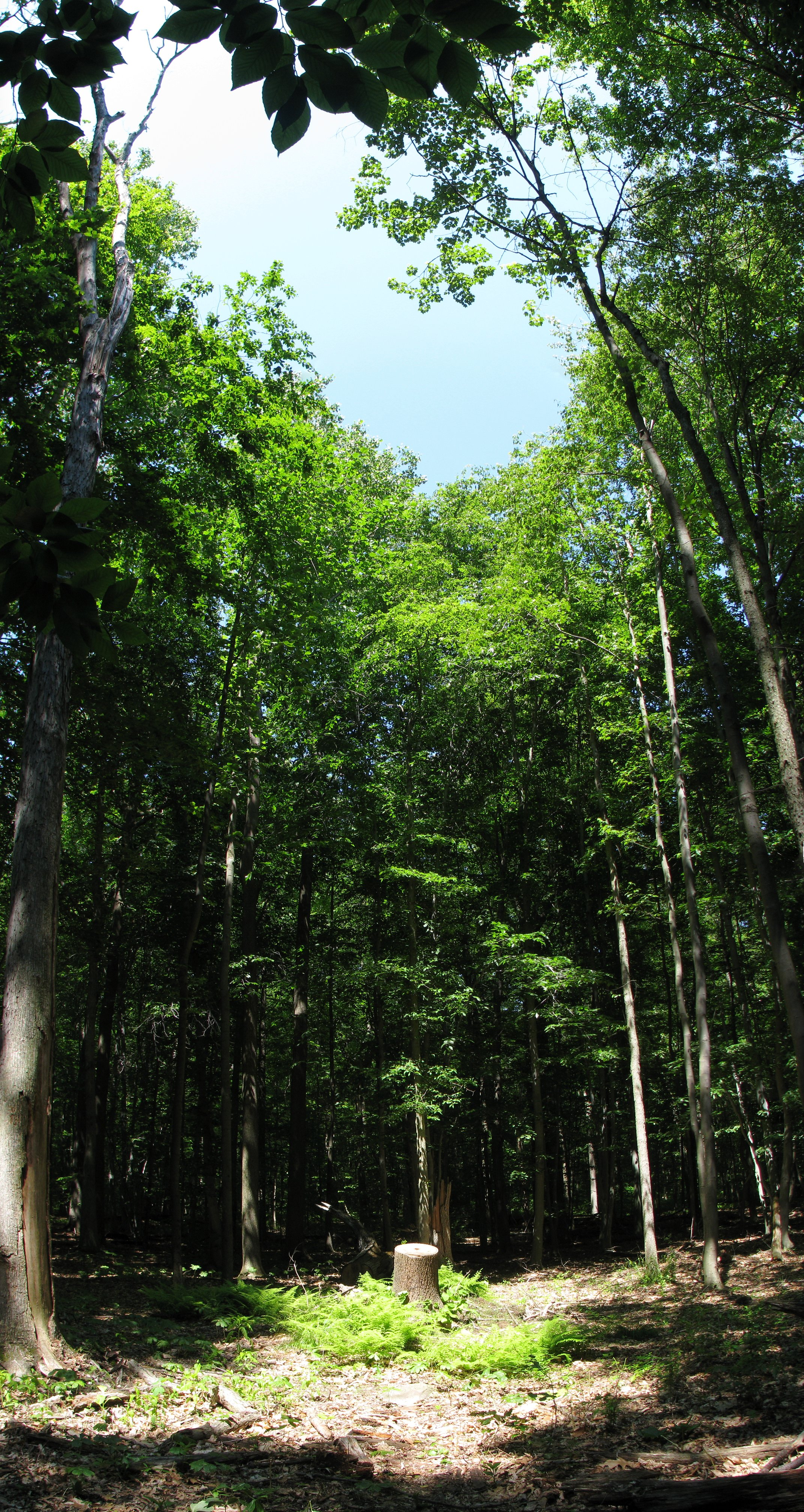
A felled tree allows direct sunlight to reach the forest floor.

The creation of a treefall gap causes a break in the canopy to form, allowing light to penetrate through to the understory. This light can now reach shrubs and treelet species, which under normal circumstances never grow tall enough to reach the canopy. Under a normal canopy (i.e. one where there is no treefall gap), there is very little light that filters through, placing a light limitation on the understory plant community. This light limitation often restricts a plant's reproduction and growing ability.

When a treefall gap forms, there is a distinguishable difference in the amount of light that penetrates through to the lower levels of the forest; however, the amount of light that is now able to penetrate depends on how big the gap actually is. A treefall gap that is only 5 meters in diameter will allow less light to reach the understory than a larger gap that is 10 meters wide. In addition, a smaller gap will receive more direct radiation from the sun, whereas a larger gap will receive high amounts of diffuse radiation. The increased amount of light that is now available to the understory community will release them from their previous light limitation.

== Seed dispersal ==
Seed dispersal in treefall gaps is significantly reduced compared to normal understory areas. One study suggests that within the first three years after the gaps formed, the seed dispersal rate was 72% lower than the rates in nearby understory. Most forms of dispersal, such as wind and animal dispersal, show a reduction in the number of seeds dispersed. However, explosive dispersion shows an increase

Explosive dispersion describes a mechanism by which the parent plant ejects its seeds using pressure, ensuring that they land far from the parent plant. This type of dispersal is used in several shrub species. The increase shows that treefall gaps have a positive effect on the seed dispersal of shrubs. These shrubs either survived the creation of the gap or migrated in soon after it was created. Because of their unique method of dispersal, these plants have an advantage when colonizing the gap. As the treefall gap ages and the canopy layer begins to return to normal, other forms of seed dispersal begin to increase in frequency, eventually returning to their pre-gap values years after its formation.

== Species diversity ==
=== Flora ===
It is proposed that treefall gaps maintain plant species diversity in tropical forests in three main ways. First, they create habitats that have a lot of light. Being in an area that contains a high amount of light allows species that cannot grow in total or partial shade to develop rapidly. The increased levels of light creates competition between the shade intolerant species, and the species that prefer low levels of light are eliminated. This release from competition would allow the number of shade intolerant species to increase.

Second, species may be able to survive on resources that spread from the middle of the gap all the way to the surrounding denser forest. Tree or plant diversity may be maintained by the distribution and sharing of resources over a gradient if species are uniquely adapted to the resources available in a specific treefall gap.

Lastly, the rate of regeneration of different species may differ based on the size of the gap. While species diversity may vary when the treefall gaps differ greatly in size, it has been argued that it is highly unlikely, since the relationship between gap size and the microclimate is irregular because of the large spatial and temporal deviation in microclimate.

Support for these three hypotheses is mixed, but there is evidence that supports the fact that some species of plants benefit from being in gaps more than others. In tropical forests, gaps maintain the diversity of some plant groups, which could possibly contain much of the vascular plant community in these areas.

=== Insects ===
Treefall gaps, like the rest of tropical forests, contain an abundant number of animal species. As with all tropical habitats, insects make up the majority of the animal biomass.

It has been thought that the development of treefall gaps would cause harm to the development of leaf litter ant assemblages, but that is not the case according to one study. Species of ants that are found in treefall gaps are the same species that are found in the densely wooded forests that surround them. The formations of these gaps seem to have little to no effect on the ant species living there.

There have been studies that show a noticeable difference in the species diversity of butterflies in treefall gaps and those in the surrounding understory. The types of vegetation present in the gaps play a key role in determining which species of butterfly live there. This supports the hypothesis that in a natural forest, treefall gaps will promote species diversity.

== Treefall gaps, blow-downs, and the carbon cycle ==
Large-scale blow-downs of trees are generally caused by squall lines or tornadoes generating strong winds. Some studies have measured the downburst speed of these winds to be between 26 and 41 m/s, which is enough force to cause large-scale blow-downs. Studies have shown that small-scale disturbances, such as treefall gaps forming after tree deaths, have a higher reoccurrence rate than do large-scale disturbances, such as blow-downs. Since small-scale disturbances are more frequent, they account for about 88% of carbon emissions from the Amazon rainforest and for more biomass loss then do large-scale disturbances. These small disturbances add carbon into the environment and back into the carbon cycle; however, it is not a significant amount when compared to how much carbon is being sequestered in the above ground biomass. Because of this, the Amazon is considered to be a carbon sink.

== Use of satellite technology in research ==
When researchers attempt to locate treefall gaps on a broad scale, it can be difficult to do so on the ground because of the large scale of the forests that they are generally focusing on. Satellite imagery has proven quite useful for large-scale disturbances such as blow-downs but remains difficult for small-scale disturbances such as treefall gaps. In some instances Global Positioning Systems (GPS) are used to map the centers of treefall gaps in order to determine their frequency. Pictures taken by these satellites are radiometrically changed from numbers into physical units. Light Detection and Ranging (LiDAR) is used to distinguish canopy gaps on spatial scales for separating the different types of gaps. With satellite imaging, steps have to be implemented to remove extraneous details such as seas, rivers, clouds, etc. These can interfere with the results. Overall, the mapping of treefall gaps has progressed greatly since the development of satellite technology.

== See also ==
- Crown shyness
