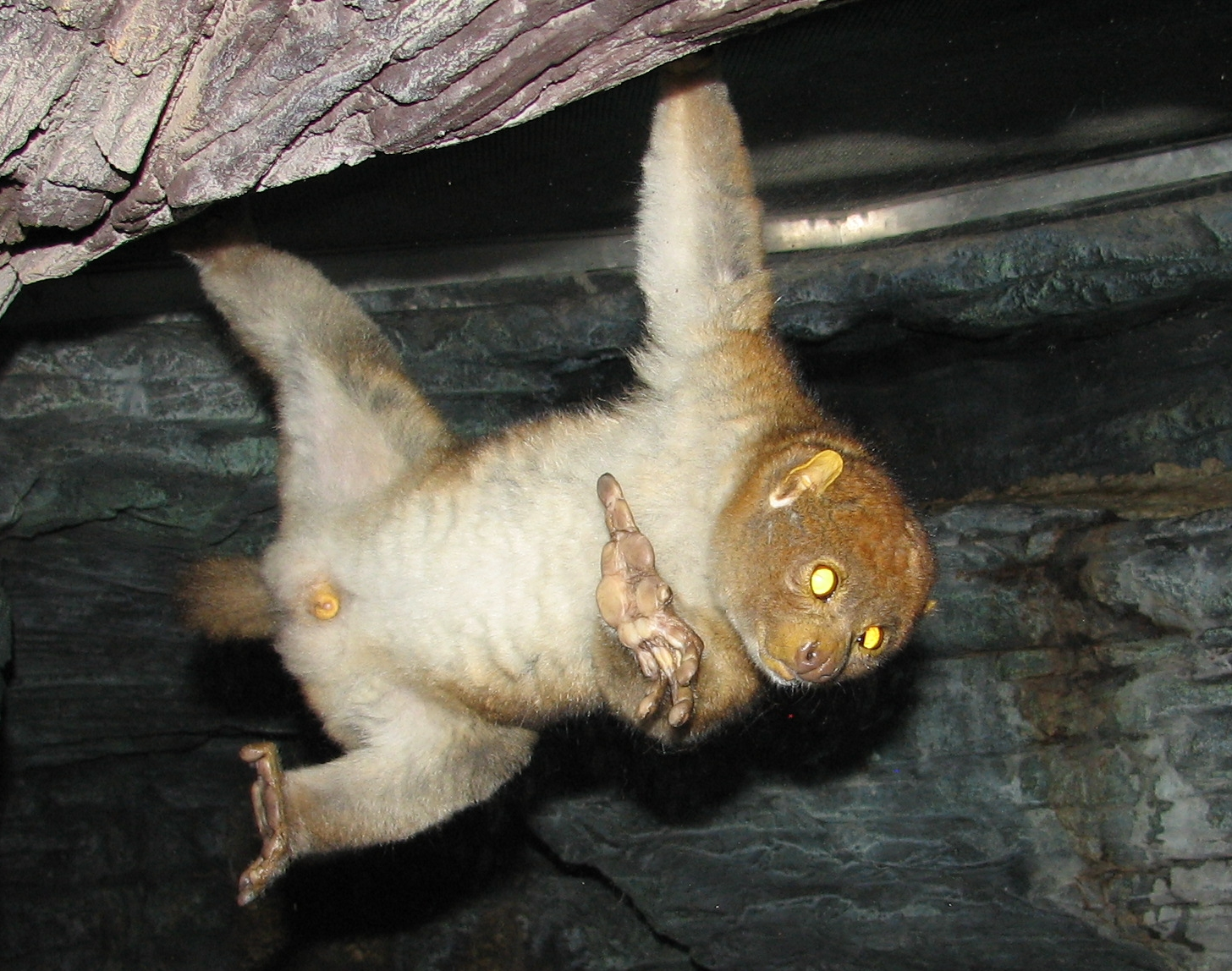

Scientific classification
- Kingdom: Animalia
- Phylum: Chordata
- Class: Mammalia
- Infraclass: Placentalia
- Order: Primates
- Suborder: Strepsirrhini
- Family: Lorisidae
- Subfamily: Perodicticinae
- Genus: Perodicticus; Bennett, 1831

Type species
- Lemur potto Müller, 1766

Species
- Perodicticus edwardsi Perodicticus ibeanus Perodicticus potto
- Geographic range of all three species

= Potto =

Arboreal primate of west-central Africa

The pottos are three species of strepsirrhine primate in the genus Perodicticus of the family Lorisidae. In some English-speaking parts of Africa, they are called "softly-softlys".

== Etymology ==
The common name "potto" may be from Wolof pata (a tailless monkey).

The generic name Perodicticus is composed of Greek πηρός (pērós, 'maimed') and δεικτικός (deiktikós, "able to show/indicate", cf. δείκτης, deíktēs, 'index finger'). It refers to the stubby index finger that seems mutilated.

== Taxonomy ==
There are three species recognized by the IUCN Red List and American Society of Mammalogists:

Formerly, all species were classified under one species, P. potto. However, variation among pottos is significant, prompting speculation that there may be more than one species. A 2015 study confirmed there to be three distinct potto species with deep genetic divergence dating to the Miocene for all three species.

A few closely related species also have "potto" in their names: the two golden potto species (also known as angwantibos) and the false potto. Although it has been suggested that the differences that separate the false potto from the West African potto are a result of an anomalous specimen being used as the holotype which may have been a West African potto.

The Central and South American kinkajou (Potos flavus) and olingos (Bassaricyon sp.) are similar in appearance and behavior to African pottos, and were formerly classified with them (hence Potos). Olingos and kinkajous are now known to be members of the raccoon family.

Genus Perodicticus – Bennett, 1831 – three species
Common name	Scientific name and subspecies	Range	Size and ecology	IUCN status and estimated population
Central African potto	P. edwardsi Bouvier, 1879	Central Africa	Size: 30–37 cm (12–15 in) long, plus 3–7 cm (1–3 in) tail Habitat: Forest Diet: Gum, insects, snails and fruit	LC Unknown
East African potto	P. ibeanus Thomas, 1910 Two subspecies: P. i. ibeanus (Eastern potto); P. i. stockleyi (Mount Kenya potto)	East central Africa	Size: 29–37 cm (11–15 in) long, plus 4–10 cm (2–4 in) tail Habitat: Forest Diet: Fruit, gum, nectar, and invertebrates, as well as moss, frogs, and eggs	LC Unknown
West African potto	P. potto (P. Müller, 1766)	Western equatorial Africa	Size: 30–39 cm (12–15 in) long, plus 3–10 cm (1–4 in) tail Habitat: Forest Diet: Fruit, arthropods, insects, and eggs, as well as small vertebrates	NT Unknown

== Description ==
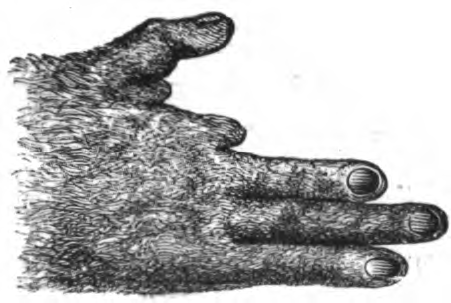
Potto hand

The potto grows to a length of 30 to 39 cm (12 to 15 in), with a short (3 to 10 cm) tail, and its weight varies from 600 to 1,600 grams (21 to 56 oz). The close, woolly fur is grey-brown. The index finger is vestigial, although it has opposable thumbs with which it grasps branches firmly. Like other strepsirrhines the potto has a moist nose, toothcomb, and a toilet claw on the second toe of the hind legs. In the hands and feet, fingers three and four are connected to each other by a slight skin fold, while toes three through five are joined at their bases by a skin web that extends to near the proximal third of the toes.

The neck has four to six low tubercles or growths that cover its elongated vertebrae which have sharp points and nearly pierce the skin; these are used as defensive weapons. Both males and females have large scent glands under the tail (in females, the swelling created by the glands is known as a pseudo-scrotum), which they use to mark their territories and to reinforce pair bonds. The potto has a distinct odor that some observers have likened to curry.

== Distribution and habitat ==
Pottos inhabit the canopy of rain forests in tropical Africa: from Nigeria, Guinea to Kenya and Uganda into the north of the Democratic Republic of Congo. They are nocturnal and arboreal, sleeping during the day in the leaves and almost never descending from the trees.

== Behaviour and ecology ==
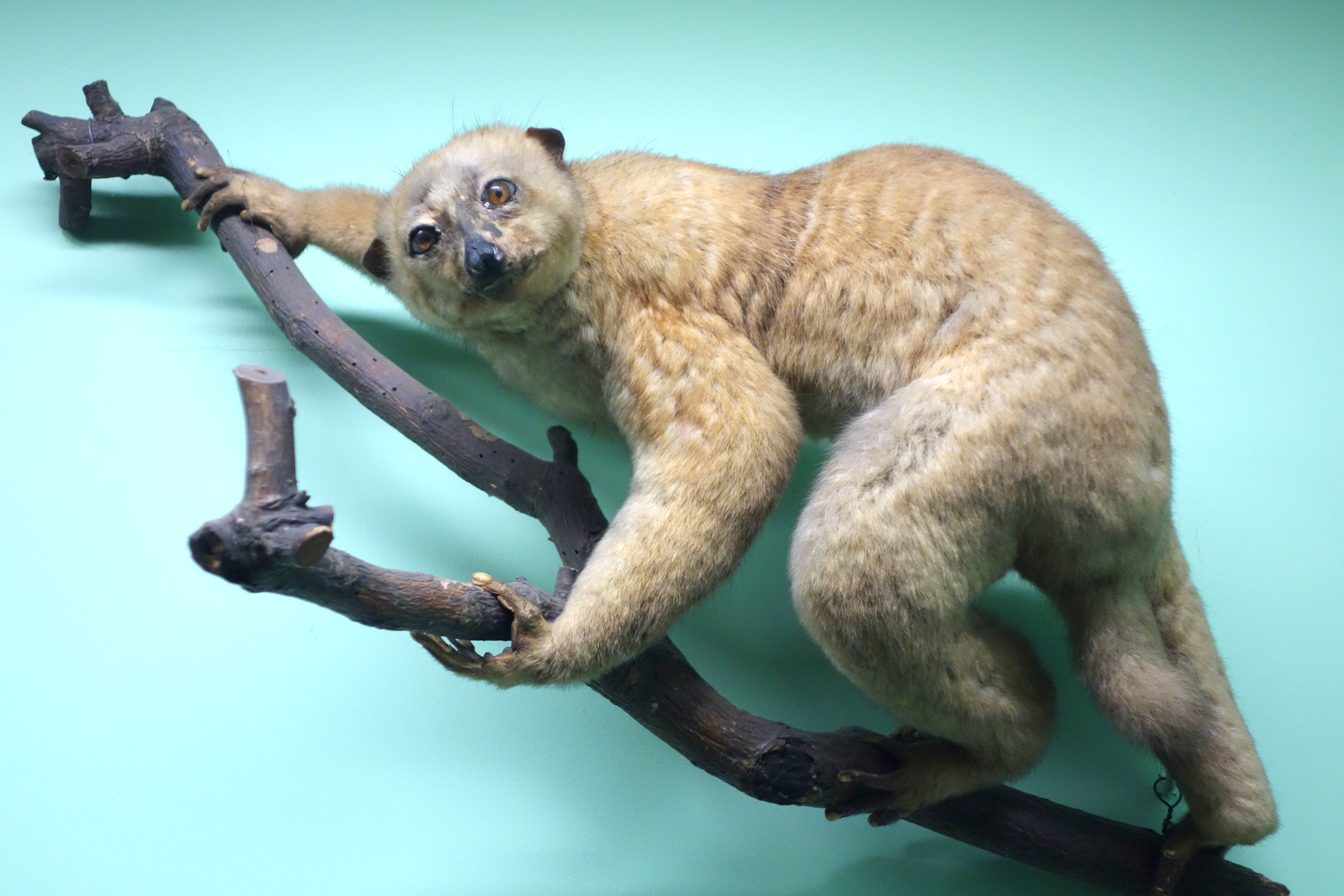
Potto gripping branches

Pottos move slowly and carefully, always gripping a branch with at least two limbs. They are also quiet and avoid predators using cryptic movement. The most common call is a high-pitched "tsic", which is used mainly between mother and offspring.

Studies of stomach contents have shown the potto diet consists of about 65% fruit, 21% tree gums and 10% insects. Pottos have also occasionally been known to catch bats and small birds. Their strong jaws enable it to eat fruits and lumps of dried gum that are too tough for other tree-dwellers. The insects they eat tend to have a strong smell and are generally not eaten by other animals.

Pottos have large territories which they mark with urine and glandular secretions. Same-sex intruders are vehemently guarded against, and each male's territory generally overlaps with that of two or more females. Females have been known to donate part of their territories to their daughters, but sons leave their mother's territory upon maturity.

As part of their courting rituals, pottos often meet for bouts of mutual grooming. This is frequently performed while they hang upside down from a branch. Grooming consists of licking, combing fur with the grooming claw and teeth, and anointing with the scent glands. Pottos mate face-to-face while hanging upside down from a branch.

After a gestation period of about 193–205 days, the female gives birth, typically to a single young, but twins are known to occur. The young first are clasped to the belly of the mother, but later she carries them on her back. She can also hide her young in the leaves while searching for food. After about six months, they are weaned, and are fully mature after about 18 months.

=== Predators and defences ===
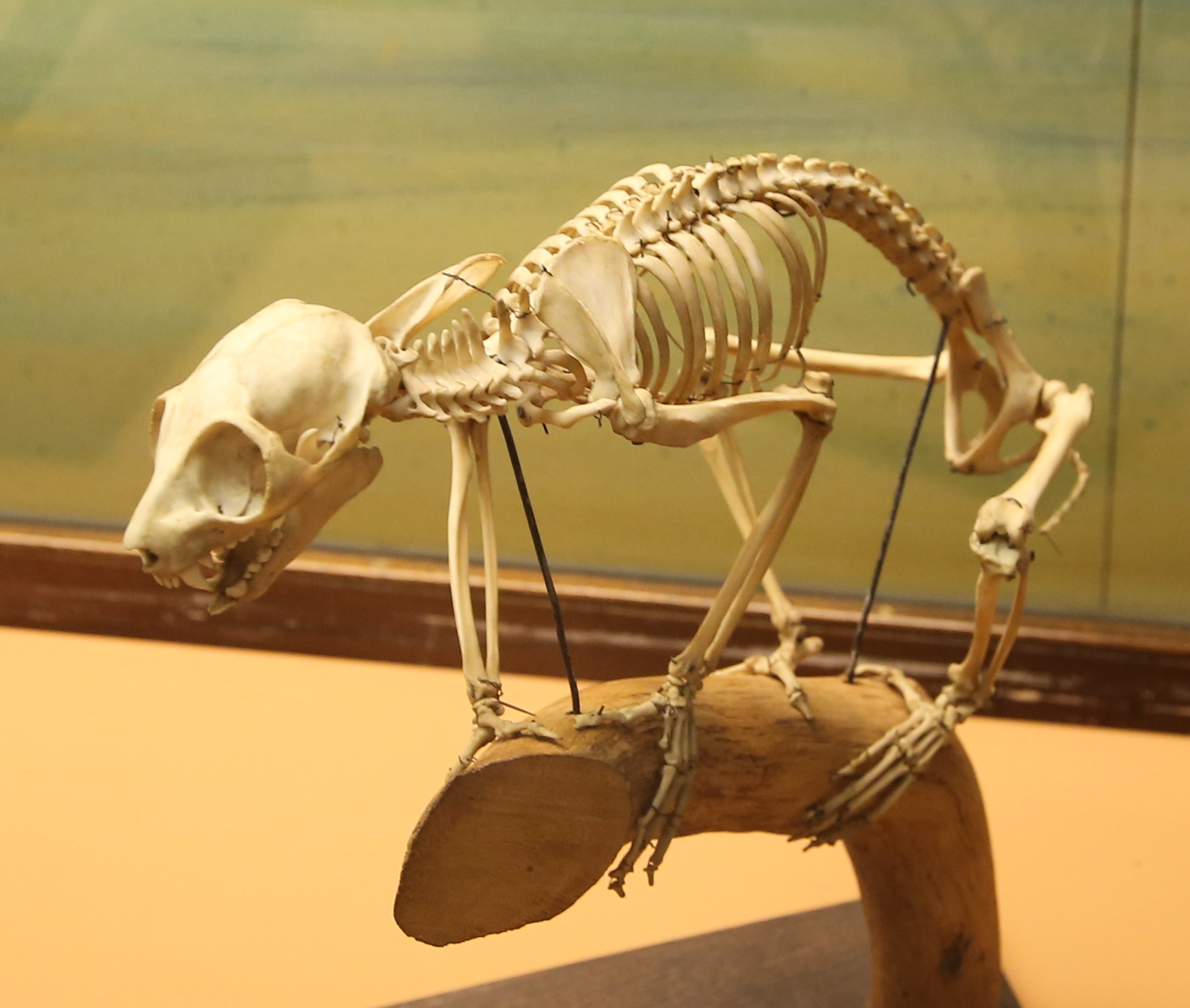
Perodicticus potto skeleton

Pottos have relatively few predators, because large mammalian carnivores cannot climb to the treetops where they live, and the birds of prey in this part of Africa are diurnal. Pottos living near villages face some predation from humans, who hunt them as bushmeat; the West African potto is thought to be threatened due to this. They are sometimes preyed upon by African palm civets, although African palm civets are largely frugivorous.

If threatened, the potto will hide its face and neck-butt its opponent, making use of its unusual vertebrae. It can also deliver a powerful bite. Its saliva contains compounds that cause the wound to become inflamed.

The highest recorded life span for a potto in captivity is 26 years.

=== Cognition and social behaviour ===
In a study of strepsirrhine cognition conducted in 1964, pottos were seen to explore and manipulate unfamiliar objects, but only when those objects were baited with food. They were found to be more curious than lorises and lesser bushbabies, but less so than lemurs. Ursula Cowgill, a biologist at Yale University who looked after six captive pottos for several decades, noticed they appeared to form altruistic relationships. The captive pottos were seen to spend time with a sick companion and to save food for an absent one. However, there is no confirmation this behaviour occurs in the wild.

== Sources ==
- Kingdon, Jonathan; Happold, David; Butynski, Thomas; Hoffmann, Michael; Happold, Meredith; Kalina, Jan, eds. (2013). Mammals of Africa. Vol. 2. Bloomsbury Publishing. ISBN 978-1-4081-8996-2.
