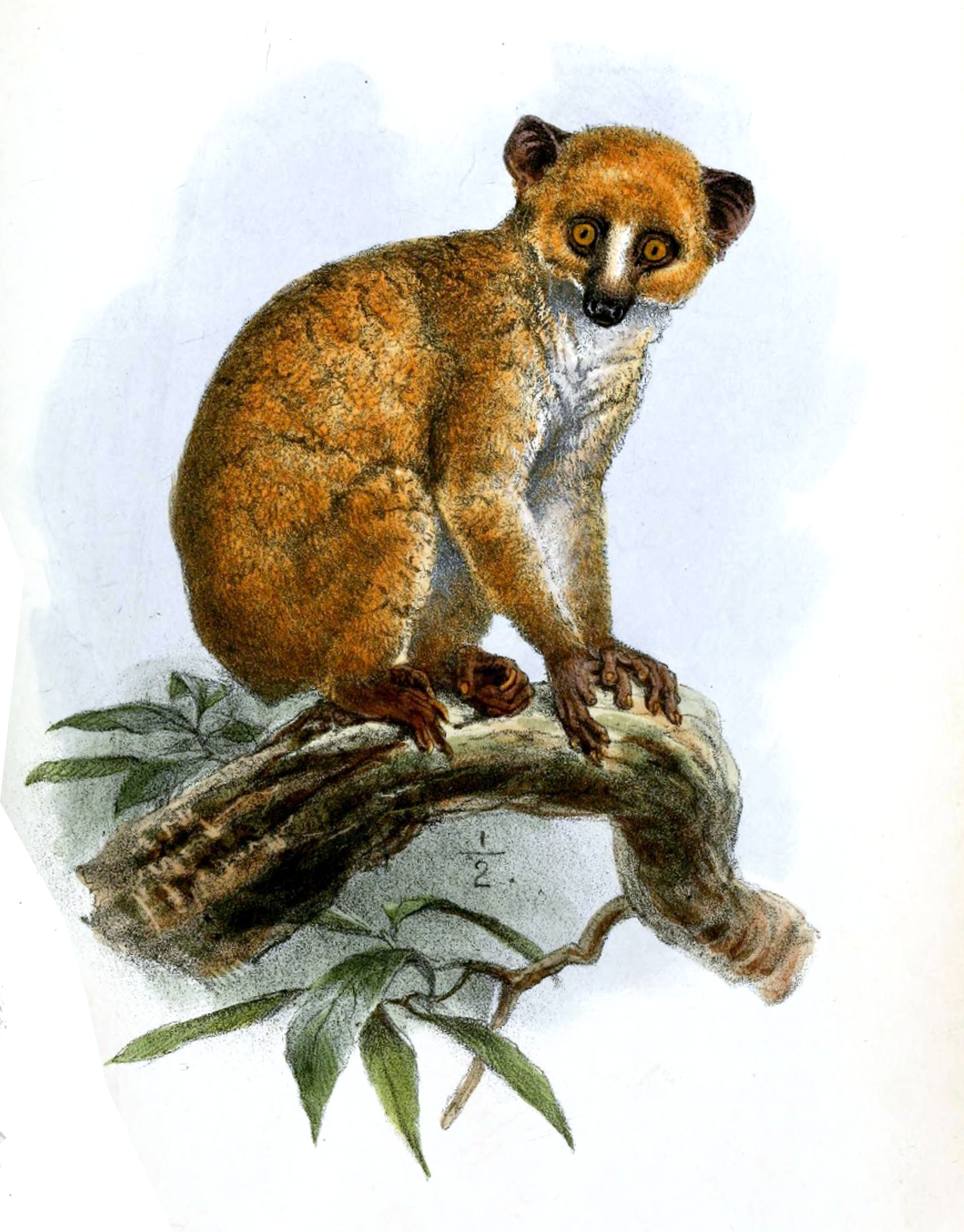
- Calabar angwantibo, Arctocebus calabarensis

Scientific classification
- Kingdom: Animalia
- Phylum: Chordata
- Class: Mammalia
- Infraclass: Placentalia
- Order: Primates
- Suborder: Strepsirrhini
- Family: Lorisidae
- Subfamily: Perodicticinae
- Genus: Arctocebus; J. E. Gray, 1863

Type species
- Perodicticus calabarensis J. A. Smith, 1860

Species
- Arctocebus calabarensis Arctocebus aureus

= Angwantibo =

Golden pottos

Genus of primates

Angwantibos are two species of strepsirrhine primates classified in the genus Arctocebus of the family Lorisidae. They are also known as golden pottos because of their yellow or golden coloration.

Angwantibos live in tropical Africa and their range includes Nigeria, Cameroon north of the Democratic Republic of Congo.

Angwantibos grow to a size of 22 to 30 cm, and have almost no tail at all. They only weigh up to 0.5 kg. Their fur is yellow brown to golden in color. Their snout is more pointed than that of the other lorids and this, along with their round ears, gives it the bear-like appearance that lends them their name in German: Bärenmaki, "bear lemur".

Solitary, nocturnal and arboreal, they prefer the underbrush and the lower layers of the forests. They spend the day hidden in the leaves. Like all lorisids they are characterized by slow movements.

The diet of angwantibos consists predominantly of insects (mostly caterpillars), and occasionally fruits. Owing to their careful movements and their good sense of smell, they can quietly stalk and close-in on their prey and catch it with a lightning-quick movement.

The males mate with all available females whose territory overlaps with theirs. Copulation takes place hanging onto a branch. Gestation lasts 130 days and births are of a single offspring. The juvenile clasps itself first to the belly of the mother and later she may park her offspring on a branch while she goes searching for food. Within three to four months the young are weaned, at about six months it leaves its mother, and at an age of eight to ten months it becomes fully mature. The life expectancy of angwantibos is at most 13 years.

A subplot in Gerald Durrell's first book The Overloaded Ark centres on his attempts to secure an angwantibo for zoological study.

== Species ==
Genus Arctocebus – Gray, 1863 – two species
Common name	Scientific name and subspecies	Range	Size and ecology	IUCN status and estimated population
Calabar angwantibo	A. calabarensis (J. A. Smith, 1860)	Western equatorial Africa	Size: 22–31 cm (9–12 in) long, plus 4–10 cm (2–4 in) tail Habitat: Forest Diet: Insects, as well as fruit and gum	NT Unknown
Golden angwantibo	A. aureus de Winton, 1902	Western equatorial Africa	Size: 22–26 cm (9–10 in) long, plus vestigial tail Habitat: Forest Diet: Insects and fruit	LC Unknown

== Sources ==
- Kingdon, Jonathan (2020). The Kingdon Pocket Guide to African Mammals (2nd ed.). Bloomsbury Publishing. ISBN 978-1-4729-8320-6.
