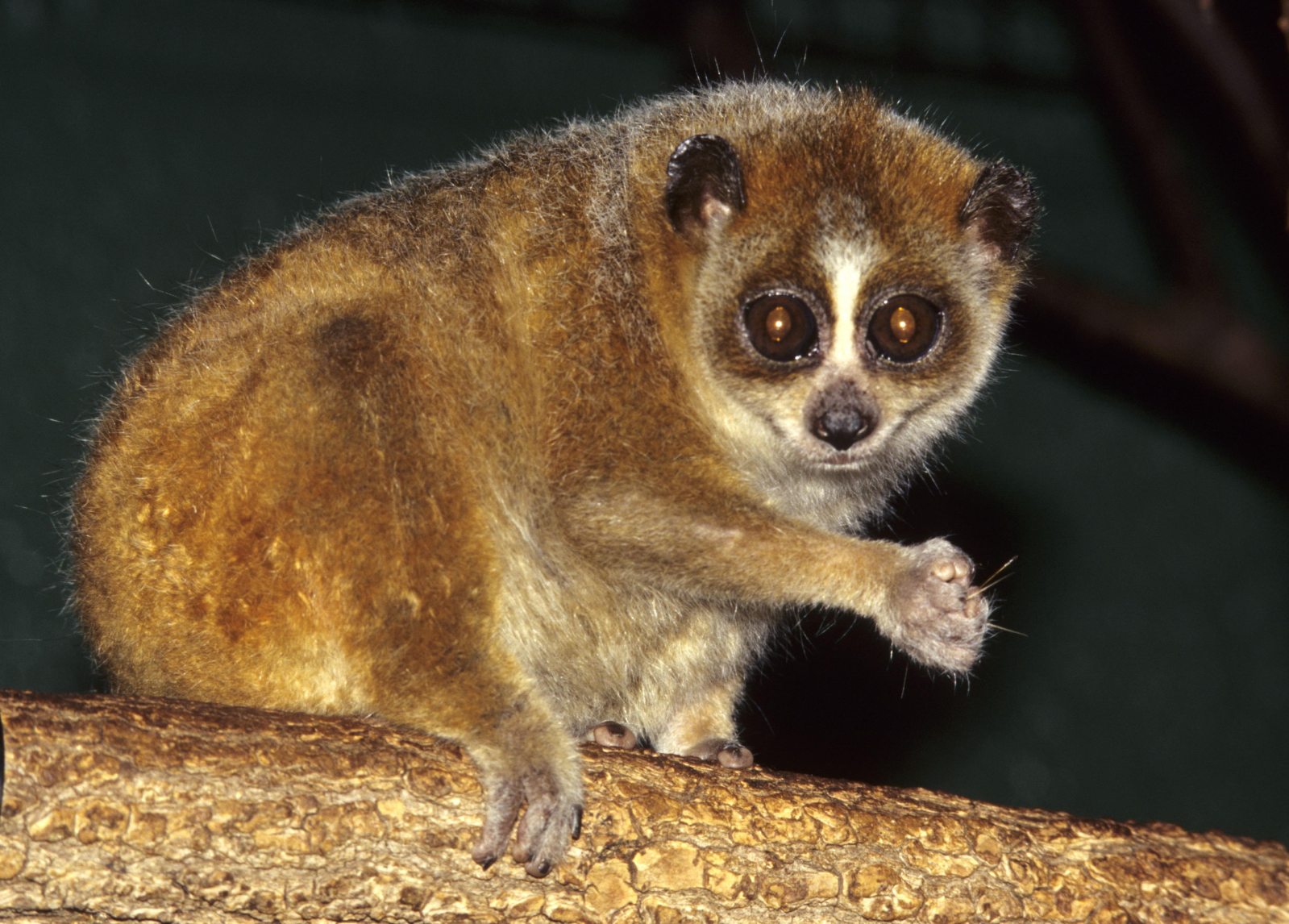
- Pygmy slow loris

Scientific classification
- Kingdom: Animalia
- Phylum: Chordata
- Class: Mammalia
- Order: Primates
- Suborder: Strepsirrhini
- Superfamily: Lorisoidea
- Family: Lorisidae; Gray, 1821

Type genus
- Loris Geoffroy, 1796

Subfamilies
- Lorinae – 3 genera; Perodicticinae – 2 genera
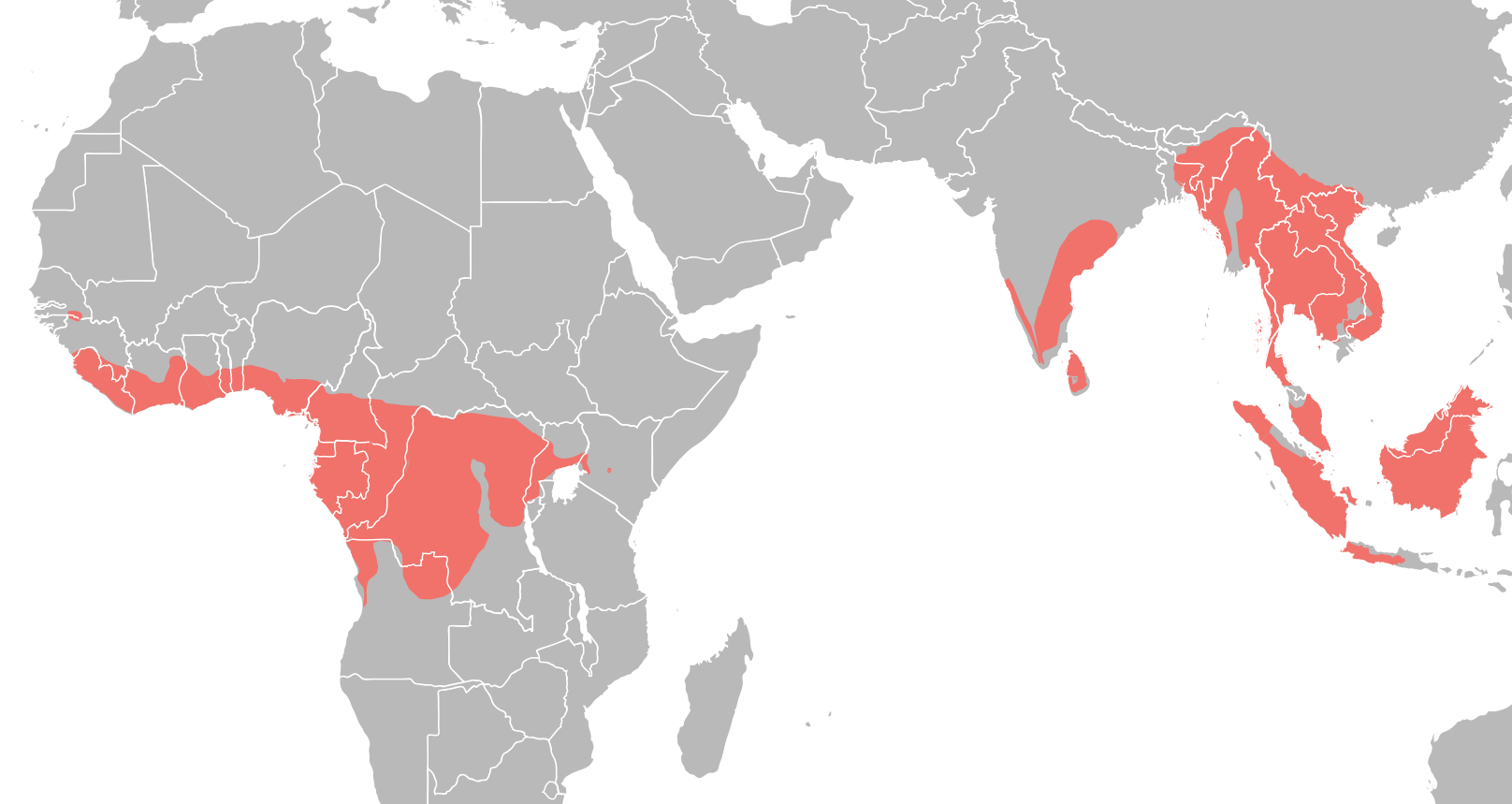
- Lorisidae distribution

Synonyms
- Loridae Jenkins, 1987

= Lorisidae =

Lorisids Temporal range: Early Miocene–Recent

Family of primates

Lorisidae (or sometimes Loridae) is a family of strepsirrhine primates. The lorisids are all slim arboreal animals and comprise the lorises, pottos, and angwantibos. Lorisids live in tropical, central Africa as well as in south and southeast Asia.

== Classification ==
There are five genera and sixteen species of lorisid.

- Order Primates
  - Suborder Strepsirrhini: non-tarsier prosimians
    - Infraorder Lemuriformes
      - Superfamily Lemuroidea
      - Superfamily Lorisoidea
        - Family Lorisidae
          - Subfamily Perodicticinae
            - Genus Arctocebus, angwantibos
            - Genus Perodicticus, pottos
          - Subfamily Lorisinae
            - Genus Loris, slender lorises
            - Genus Nycticebus, slow lorises
            - Genus Xanthonycticebus, pygmy slow loris
        - Family Galagidae: galagos
  - Suborder Haplorrhini: tarsiers, monkeys and apes

== Description ==
Lorisids have a close, woolly fur, which is usually grey or brown, darker on the top side. The eyes are large and face forward. The ears are small and often partially hidden in the fur. The thumbs are opposable and the index finger is short. The second toe of the hind legs has a fine claw for grooming, typical for strepsirrhines. Their tails are short or are missing completely. They grow to a length of 17 to 40 cm and a weight of between 0.3 and 2 kg, depending on the species. Their dental formula is similar to that of lemurs: 2.1.3.32.1.3.3

== Behavior and ecology ==
Lorisids are nocturnal and arboreal. Unlike the closely related galagos, lorisids never jump. Some have slow deliberate movements, whilst others can move with some speed across branches. It was previously thought that all lorisids moved slowly, but investigations using red light proved this to be wrong. Nonetheless, even the faster species freeze or move slowly if they hear or see any potential predator. This habit of remaining motionless whilst in danger is successful only because of the leafy environment of their jungle home, which helps to conceal their true position. With their strong hands they clasp at the branches and cannot be removed without significant force. Most lorisids are solitary or live in small family groups.

Slow lorises from southeast Asia produce a secretion from their brachial gland (a scent gland on the upper arm, between the axilla and elbow), that is licked and mixed with their saliva to form a toxin which may be used for defense. The slender lorises from Sri Lanka and South India also possess these brachial glands, but it is uncertain whether they also synthesize the toxin. The potto (Perodicticus potto) is thought to lack brachial glands, though it produces similar toxic excretions with its anal glands.

Lorisids have a gestation period of four to six months and give birth to two young. These often clasp themselves to the belly of the mother or wait in nests, while the mother goes to search for food. After three to nine months - depending on the species - they are weaned and are fully mature within 10 to 18 months. The life expectancy of lorises can be to up to 20 years.

Lorisids consume insects, bird eggs and small vertebrates as well as fruits and gums.
