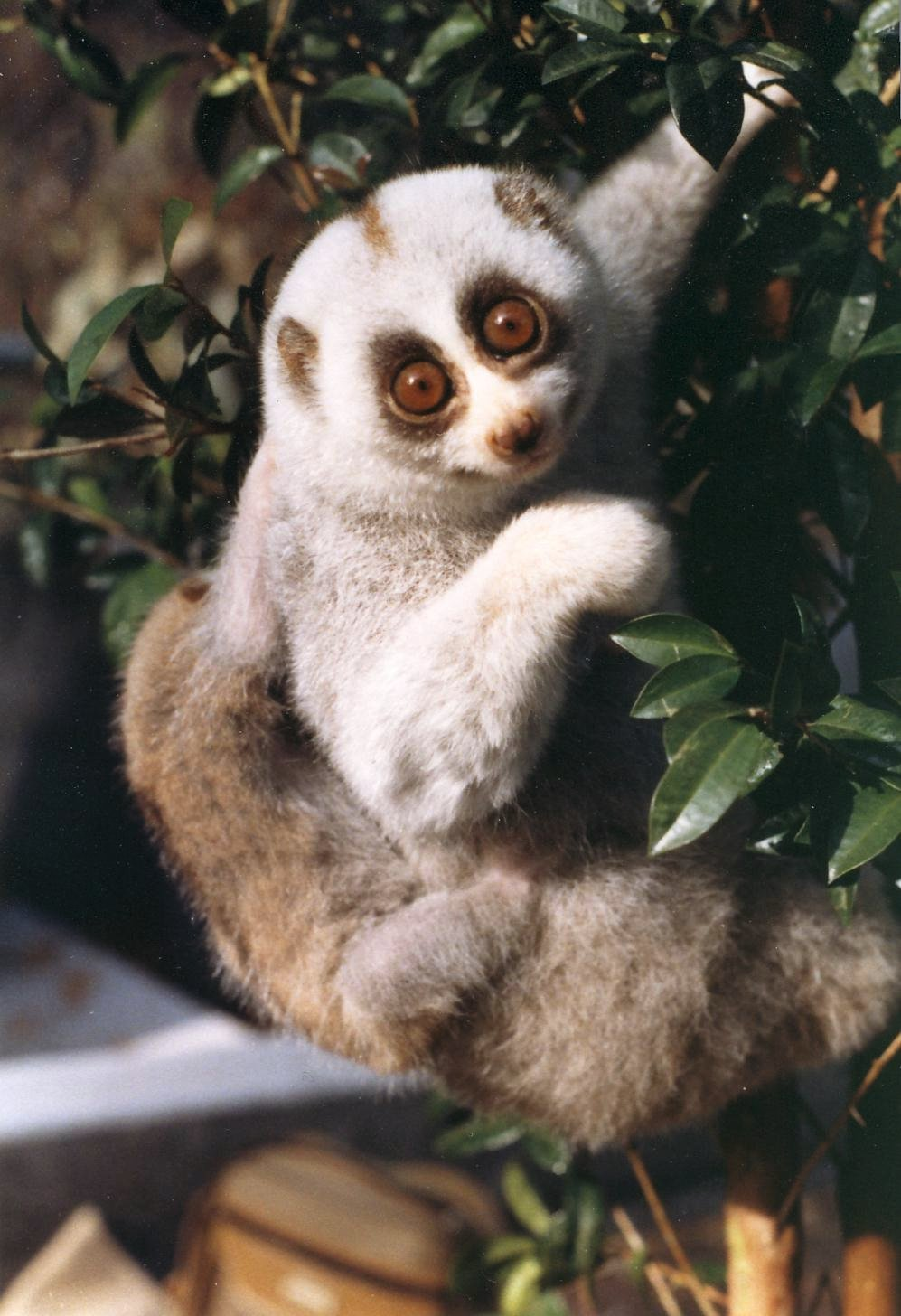

Conservation status
- Endangered (IUCN 3.1)
- CITES Appendix I

Scientific classification
- Kingdom: Animalia
- Phylum: Chordata
- Class: Mammalia
- Infraclass: Placentalia
- Order: Primates
- Suborder: Strepsirrhini
- Family: Lorisidae
- Genus: Nycticebus
- Species: N. bengalensis

Binomial name
- Nycticebus bengalensis (Lacépède, 1800)
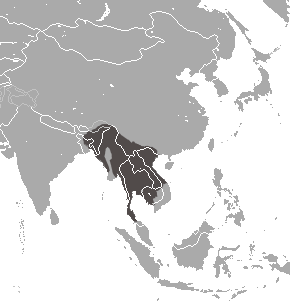
- Range of the Bengal slow loris

Synonyms
- Lori bengalensis Lacépède, 1800; Nycticebus cinereus Milne-Edwards, 1867; Nycticebus tardigradus typicus Lydekker, 1905; Nycticebus tenasserimensis Elliot, 1913; Nycticebus incanus Thomas, 1921

= Bengal slow loris =

Species of primate

The Bengal slow loris (Nycticebus bengalensis) or northern slow loris is a strepsirrhine primate and a species of slow loris native to the Bangladesh, Northeast India, Cambodia, Laos, Burma, Vietnam, southern China, and Thailand. Its geographic range is larger than that of any other slow loris species. Considered a subspecies of the Sunda slow loris (N. coucang) until 2001, phylogenetic analysis suggests that the Bengal slow loris is most closely related to the Sunda slow loris. However, some individuals in both species have mitochondrial DNA sequences that resemble those of the other species, due to introgressive hybridization. It is the largest species of slow loris, measuring 26 to 38 cm (10 to 15 in) from head to tail and weighing between 1 and 2.1 kg (2.2 and 4.6 lb). Like other slow lorises, it has a wet nose (rhinarium), a round head, flat face, large eyes, small ears, a vestigial tail, and dense, woolly fur. The toxin it secretes from its brachial gland (a scent gland in its arm) differs chemically from that of other slow loris species and may be used to communicate information about sex, age, health, and social status.

The Bengal slow loris is nocturnal and arboreal, occurring in both evergreen and deciduous forests. It prefers rainforests with dense canopies, and its presence in its native habitat indicates a healthy ecosystem. It is a seed disperser and pollinator, as well as a prey item for carnivores. Its diet primarily consists of fruit, but also includes insects, tree gum, snails, and small vertebrates. In winter, it relies on plant exudates, such as sap and tree gum. The species lives in small family groups, marks its territory with urine, and sleeps during the day by curling up in dense vegetation or in tree holes. It is not a seasonal breeder, reproducing once every 12–18 months and usually giving birth to a single offspring. For the first three months, mothers carry their offspring, which reach sexual maturity at around 20 months. The Bengal slow loris can live up to 20 years.

The species is listed as endangered on the IUCN Red List, and is threatened with extinction due to growing demand in the exotic pet trade and traditional medicine. It is one of the most common animals sold in local animal markets. In traditional medicine, it is primarily used by wealthy to middle-class, urban women following childbirth, but also to treat stomach problems, broken bones, and sexually transmitted diseases. It is also hunted for food and suffers from habitat loss. Wild populations have declined severely, and it is locally extinct in several regions. It is found within many protected areas throughout its range, but this does not protect them from rampant poaching and illegal logging. Critical conservation issues for this species include enhancing protection measures, stricter enforcement of wildlife protection laws, and increased connectivity between fragmented protected areas.

== Taxonomy and phylogeny ==
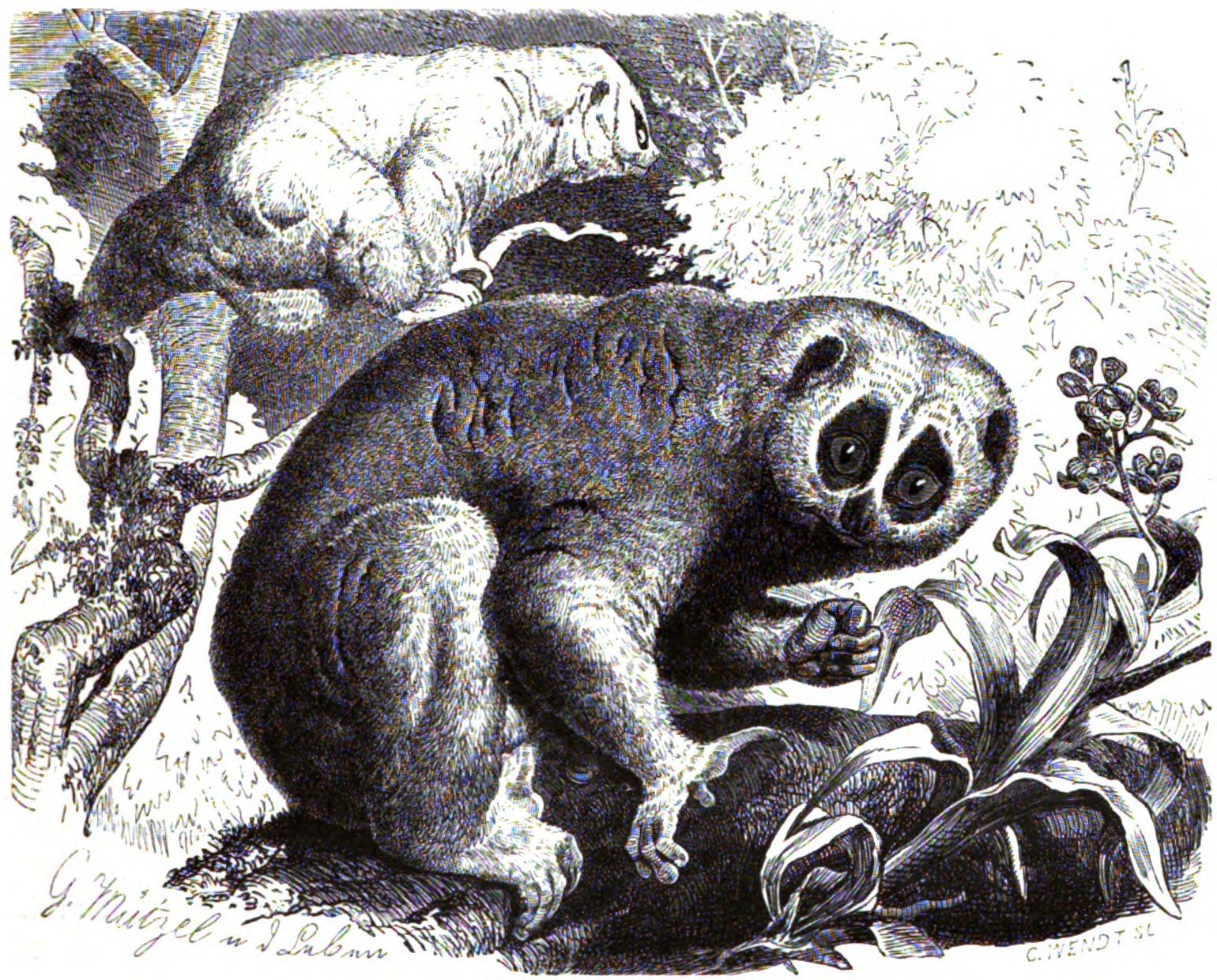
The Bengal slow loris was long considered a subspecies until it was recognized as a distinct species in 2001.

Nycticebus bengalensis, commonly known as the Bengal slow loris or northern slow loris, is a strepsirrhine primate in the slow loris genus, Nycticebus. Formerly considered a subspecies of the Sunda slow loris (N. coucang), it was recognized as a distinct species in 2001 by taxonomist and primatologist Colin Groves. It is difficult to distinguish from the other species in its genus.

To help clarify species and subspecies boundaries, and to establish whether morphology-based classifications were consistent with evolutionary relationships, the phylogenetic relationships within the genus Nycticebus have been investigated using DNA sequences derived from the mitochondrial markers D loop and cytochrome b. Although most of the recognized lineages of Nycticebus (including N. pygmaeus, N. menagensis, and N. javanicus) were shown to be genetically distinct—the analysis suggested that DNA sequences from some individuals of N. coucang and N. bengalensis apparently share a closer evolutionary relationship with each other than with members of their own species. The authors suggest that this result may be explained by introgressive hybridization, as the tested individuals of these two taxa originated from a region of sympatry in southern Thailand. The precise origin of one of the N. coucang individuals was not known. This hypothesis was corroborated by a 2007 study that compared the variations in mitochondrial DNA sequences between N. bengalensis and N. coucang, and suggested that there has been gene flow between the two species.

== Anatomy and physiology ==
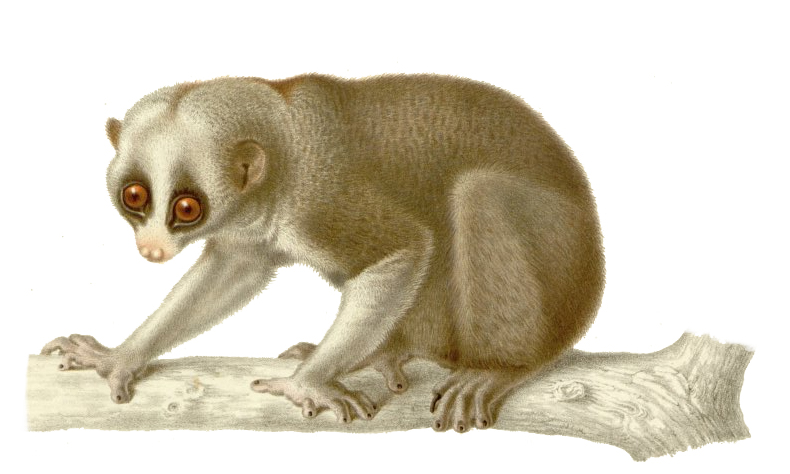
The Bengal slow loris has large eyes, a round head, and short ears, as shown in this illustration from the mid-19th century.

The Bengal slow loris is the largest species of slow loris, weighing 1 to 2.1 kg (2.2 to 4.6 lb), and measuring between 26 and 38 cm (10 and 15 in) from head to tail. It has a skull length of more than 62 mm (2.4 in). It has dense, woolly, brown-gray fur on its back and white fur on its underside. It also has a clear dark stripe that runs up to the top of its head, but does not extend laterally towards the ears. Its forearm and hand are almost white. The limbs of the pelvis vary in color from brown to nearly white, and the feet are always pale. Moulting may cause seasonal variations in the color of the dorsal surface. Like other slow lorises, its tail is vestigial and it has a round head and short ears. It has a rhinarium (the moist, naked surface around the nostrils of the nose) and a broad, flat face with large eyes. Its eyes reflect a bright orange eye shine. On its front feet, the second digit is smaller than the rest; the big toe on its hind foot opposes the other toes, which enhances its gripping power. Its second toe on the hindfoot has a curved "toilet-claw" that the animal uses for scratching and grooming, while the other nails are straight.

In addition to being smaller than the Bengal slow loris, the sympatric Sunda slow loris also differs in its coloring: it does not have the pale areas of the head, nape, and shoulders, and its overall color is a tawny- or golden-brown. The pygmy slow loris (N. pygmaeus) is much smaller, with a skull length less than 55 mm (2.2 in). It also lacks the dark dorsal stripe of the Bengal slow loris, has dark brown fur, and longer ears.

The Bengal slow loris has a small swelling on the ventral side of its elbow called the brachial gland, which secretes a pungent, clear oily toxin that the animal uses defensively by wiping it on its toothcomb. The oil has been analyzed using gas chromatography coupled to mass spectrometry, and it has been shown that almost half of the several dozen volatile or semi-volatile chemicals present do not occur in the closely related pygmy slow loris. The most predominant component was the phenolic compound m-cresol. The authors of the study suggest that the chemically complex oils may help the lorises communicate with each other, allowing them to transmit by scent information about sex, age, health and nutritional status, and dominance.

== Behavior and ecology ==
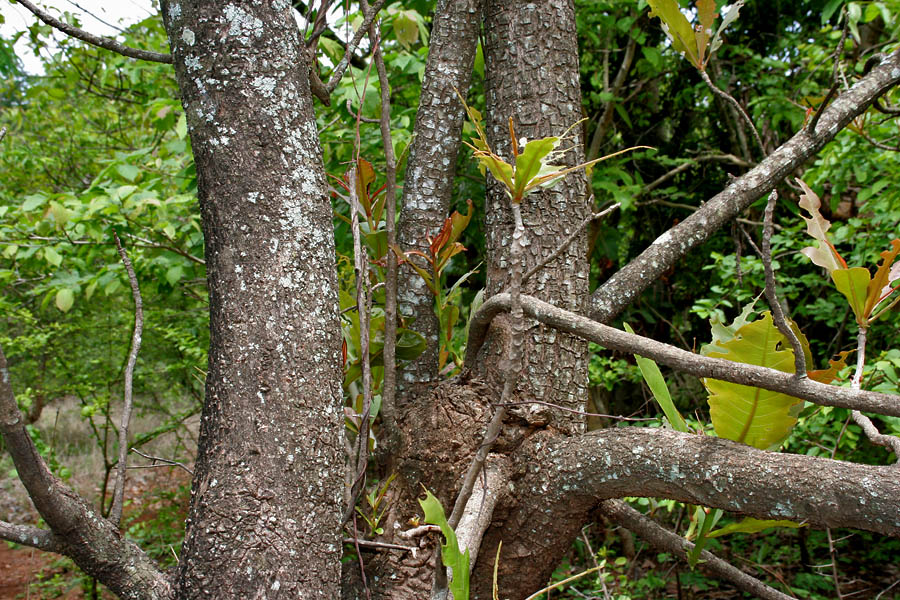
The Bengal slow loris will gouge the bark of the bastard myrobala tree to obtain exudates, an important food source—especially in winter seasons.

The preferred habitats of the Bengal slow loris range across tropical and subtropical regions, and include evergreen and semi-evergreen rainforests with forest edges and continuous, dense canopies. It can also be found in bamboo groves. It prefers habitats with larger diameter, tall trees with a large crown depth (defined as the length along the main axis from the tree tip to the base of the crown); these areas are typically associated with greater food abundance, and decreased risk of predation. Because of its preference for dense forests, it acts as a good indicator of the ecosystem's health.

The species acts as an important seed disperser and pollinator, as well as a prey item for several carnivores. The Bengal slow loris feeds on plant exudates such as sap, gums, resins, and latexes, particularly those from the family Fabaceae. Even though the species does not have keeled nails, it will scrape the plant, actively breaking its surface; this behavior resembles that of marmosets and the fork-marked lemurs. Exudates are also obtained by gouging holes in the bark. The winter food supply consists almost entirely of plant exudates. The bastard myrobala (Terminalia belerica), a deciduous tree common in Southeast Asia, is a preferred source for exudates, but it has also been observed taking plant exudates from a number of families: Moraceae (Artocarpus), Magnoliaceae (Manglietia), Fabaceae (Acacia, Bauhinia), Lecythidaceae (Careya arborea), and Sterculiaceae (Pterospermum). Although it will feed on large insects (such as katydids and crickets), gum, snails, small birds, and reptiles, it is primarily frugivorous. Lianas of the flowering plant genus Bauhinia are a commonly used food source.

A nocturnal animal, the Bengal slow loris has excellent night vision, enhanced by a tapetum lucidum—a layer of tissue in the eye that reflects visible light back through the retina. It sleeps during the day curled up in a ball in dense vegetation or in tree holes. Males and females mark their territory with urine. The species is known to live in small family groups. Animals may practice social grooming.

=== Reproduction ===
The Bengal slow loris is not a seasonal breeder, unlike the pygmy slow loris. Females in an estrous cycle attract males with a loud whistle. Females reproduce every 12–18 months and have a six-month gestation. Because they are not seasonal breeders, females could become pregnant when their offspring are approximately 6 months old, making possible for females to produce two offspring per year. Females typically give birth to a single offspring, although twins rarely occur. This differs from the sympatric pygmy slow loris, which commonly has twins. The mother carries her young about three months before they become independent, although they may be temporarily left on branches while the mother searches for food. Sexual maturity is reached at approximately 20 months of age. The species is known to live up to 20 years.

== Distribution ==
The species has the largest geographic range of all slow loris species and is native to Bangladesh, Northeast India, and Indochina (Cambodia, Laos, Burma, Vietnam, southern China, and Thailand). It is the only nocturnal primate found in the northeast Indian states, which include Assam, Mizoram, Nagaland, Meghalaya, Manipur, and Tripura. It is found in parts of Yunnan and in southwest Guangxi in China, and has been recorded in the Chittagong Hill Tracts in Bangladesh. It is known from 24 protected areas in Vietnam, and is distributed across most of Thailand. In Burma, it has been reported from Bhamo, Sumprabum, Kindat, Chin Hills, Pathein, Thaungdaung, and Pegu; populations in Laos have been recorded in the north, central, and southern portions of the country.

The Bengal slow loris is sympatric (shares its range) with the pygmy slow loris in the southeast of China, Vietnam, and Laos. The Bengal slow loris is also sympatric with the Sunda slow loris on the southern peninsula of Thailand. In 2001, Groves reported the existence of hybrids between these two species in this region.

== Conservation ==
Listed as "Data Deficient" as recently as 2006 on the IUCN Red List, the Bengal slow loris was evaluated in 2020 by the International Union for Conservation of Nature (IUCN) as endangered-a decision based solely on habitat loss due to lack of sufficient field data. It is found within numerous protected areas within its range. However, poaching and illegal logging are rampant while conservation measures are not species-specific. The species can be found in at least 43 protected areas in Northeast India, 14 conservation areas in Laos, and 24 protected areas in Vietnam. It can be found at Lawachara National Park in Bangladesh, and 80% of its range in China is protected. The species has been listed in Schedule I of the Indian Wildlife Protection Act of 1972, and in June 2007, it was transferred, along with all other slow loris species, to CITES Appendix I, which forbids international commercial trade.

The most severe threats facing the species are the wildlife trade (trapping for exotic pets and use in traditional medicine) and deforestation. Slash and burn agriculture has also resulted in the destruction of its habitat, and road construction is another factor in its decline. Hunting has been found to be most severe when nearby urban human populations increase. Enhancing protection measures, enforcing current wildlife protection laws, and improving the connectivity between protected areas are factors considered critical to ensure the survival of this species.

The species is commonly sold as a pet and to zoos throughout Southeast Asia. In Cambodia, it was reported in 2006 as one of the most common mammals found in shops and stalls, found in the hundreds and selling for US$0.85 to US$6.25. In the same year, it was found selling for US$2.50 to US$6.30 at bazaars in China (Mengla County in Yunnan Province) and US$70 in Thailand. The Bengal slow loris is used in traditional medicine in all of these countries, selling for US$15 in Vietnam, and is also eaten in Vietnam. The animal is predominantly used to prepare treatments for women after childbirth, stomach problems, healing wounds and broken bones, and in the treatment of sexually transmitted diseases. Primary users are wealthy to middle-class women in urban areas.

=== Habitat and population trends ===
Throughout its geographic range, slow lorises are in serious decline. Their habitat has been seriously degraded, and growing human populations will add increasing pressure. In countries like Bangladesh, only 9% of the original forest cover was still present in 2000. In northeastern Cambodia, forests are being cleared at an increasing rate, with a loss of 6% of the natural forest between 1999 and 2000. Within those same years, Myanmar and Thailand lost 14% and 26% of their natural forest, respectively. In Vietnam, only 30% of the original forest cover remains due to the deforestation caused by the Vietnam War, and only 10% of that includes closed-canopy forests. Habitat destruction remains rampant, and all slow loris populations within its borders are significantly depleted. Populations have been declared locally extinct in southern Quảng Nam Province and parts of the highlands, and the same is expected in Song Thanh and Kon Cha Rang nature reserves.

In India, dense forest canopy has been depleted by as much as 55% in some areas and is rapidly disappearing. As early as 1987, the Indo-China region had reportedly lost 75% of the natural habitat for slow lorises. In 1992, the population size was estimated between 16,000 and 17,000 individuals, based on available habitat; however, recent publications report that few individuals remain due to a reduced geographic range. The Bengal slow loris may be restricted to a few isolated populations and is in serious threat of becoming locally extinct in parts of Assam and Meghalaya. In Arunachal Pradesh, its population is declining and under threat.

Population density has been estimated between 0.03 and 0.33 individuals per km^{2} in Assam, India, according to a study published in 2006. A survey in 2007 at the Thrisna Wildlife Sanctuary and Sipahijola Wildlife Sanctuary in Tripura, India, yielded an encounter rate of 0.22 individuals/km, with seven of nine sightings occurring within 1.71 km^{2} (0.66 sq mi) and most of the animals found at a height of 8–15 m (26–49 ft) and near the interior of wet, deciduous forest. In 2008, the species abundance was measured at 0.18 individuals/km at Gibbon Wildlife Sanctuary in Assam.

Since the 1990s, China's forests have declined significantly. In Yunnan and Guangxi provinces, primary forests are few and isolated, and secondary forests have been severely degraded. Yunnan has lost 42% of its forests and 2,000 or less slow lorises remain. In Guangxi, the Bengal slow loris is nearly extinct. It has been extirpated in Ningming County and only a few individuals are left in Jingxi, Longzhou, and Pingxiang.

== Predation ==
Known predators of Bengal slow lorises include reticulated pythons, hawk-eagles (Spizaetus cirrhatus), and Bornean orangutans.
