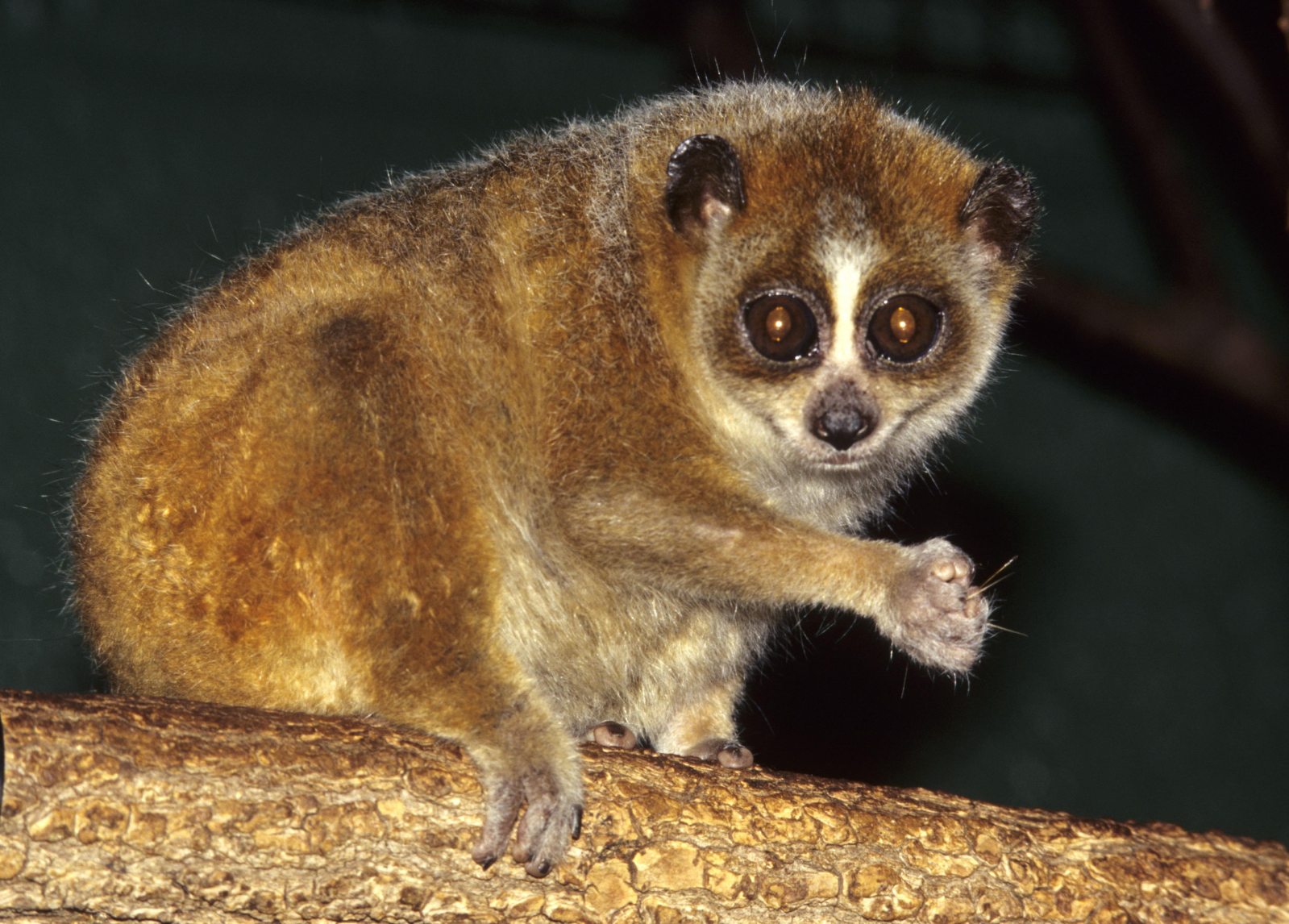

Conservation status
- Endangered (IUCN 3.1)
- CITES Appendix I

Scientific classification
- Kingdom: Animalia
- Phylum: Chordata
- Class: Mammalia
- Order: Primates
- Suborder: Strepsirrhini
- Family: Lorisidae
- Subfamily: Lorinae
- Genus: Xanthonycticebus; Nekaris & Nijman, 2022
- Species: X. pygmaeus

Binomial name
- Xanthonycticebus pygmaeus (Bonhote, 1907)
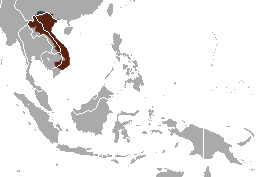
- Pygmy slow loris range

Synonyms
- Nycticebus pygmaeus Bonhote, 1907; Nycticebus intermedius Dao Van Tien, 1960

= Pygmy slow loris =

Species of primate

The pygmy slow loris (Xanthonycticebus pygmaeus) is a species of slow loris found east of the Mekong River in Vietnam, Laos, eastern Cambodia, and China. It occurs in a variety of forest habitats, including tropical dry forests, semi-evergreen, and evergreen forests. It was originally classified within Nycticebus until it was transferred to the genus Xanthonycticebus in 2022. Two species are recognised, the northern pygmy loris X. intermedius from northern Vietnam, Laos and China and the southern pygmy loris X. pygmaeus from southern Vietnam, Laos and Cambodia. The pygmy slow loris is nocturnal and arboreal, crawling along branches using slow movements in search of prey. Unlike other primates, it does not leap. It lives together in small groups usually with one or two offspring. An adult can grow to around 19–23 cm (7.5–9.1 in) long and has a very short tail. It weighs about 450 g (16 oz). Its diet consists of fruits, insects, small fauna, tree sap, and floral nectar. The animal has a toxic bite, which it gets by licking a toxic secretion from glands on the inside of its elbows. The teeth in its lower jaw form a comb-like structure called a toothcomb that is used for scraping resin from tree bark.

The pygmy slow loris mates once every 12–18 months and has one or two offspring after an average gestation period of six months. For the first few days, the young loris clings to the belly of its mother. The offspring will be nursed for an average of 4.5 months, but weaning can sometimes take up to 8 months. The female reaches sexual maturity at about 9 months, while the male reaches maturity by about 18–20 months. The pygmy slow loris is seasonally fertile during the months of July and October. Chemical signals play a role in the reproductive behavior of female pygmy slow lorises. Urine scent markings have a strong characteristic odor and are used to communicate information about social relationships.

The habitat of the pygmy slow loris in Vietnam was greatly reduced due to extensive burning, clearing, and defoliating of forests during the Vietnam War. Extensive hunting for traditional medicines is currently putting severe pressure on Cambodian populations. The pygmy slow loris is seriously threatened by hunting, trade, and habitat destruction; consequently, it is listed as endangered on the IUCN Red List and in Appendix I of the Convention on International Trade in Endangered Species of Wild Fauna and Flora.

== Taxonomy and phylogeny ==
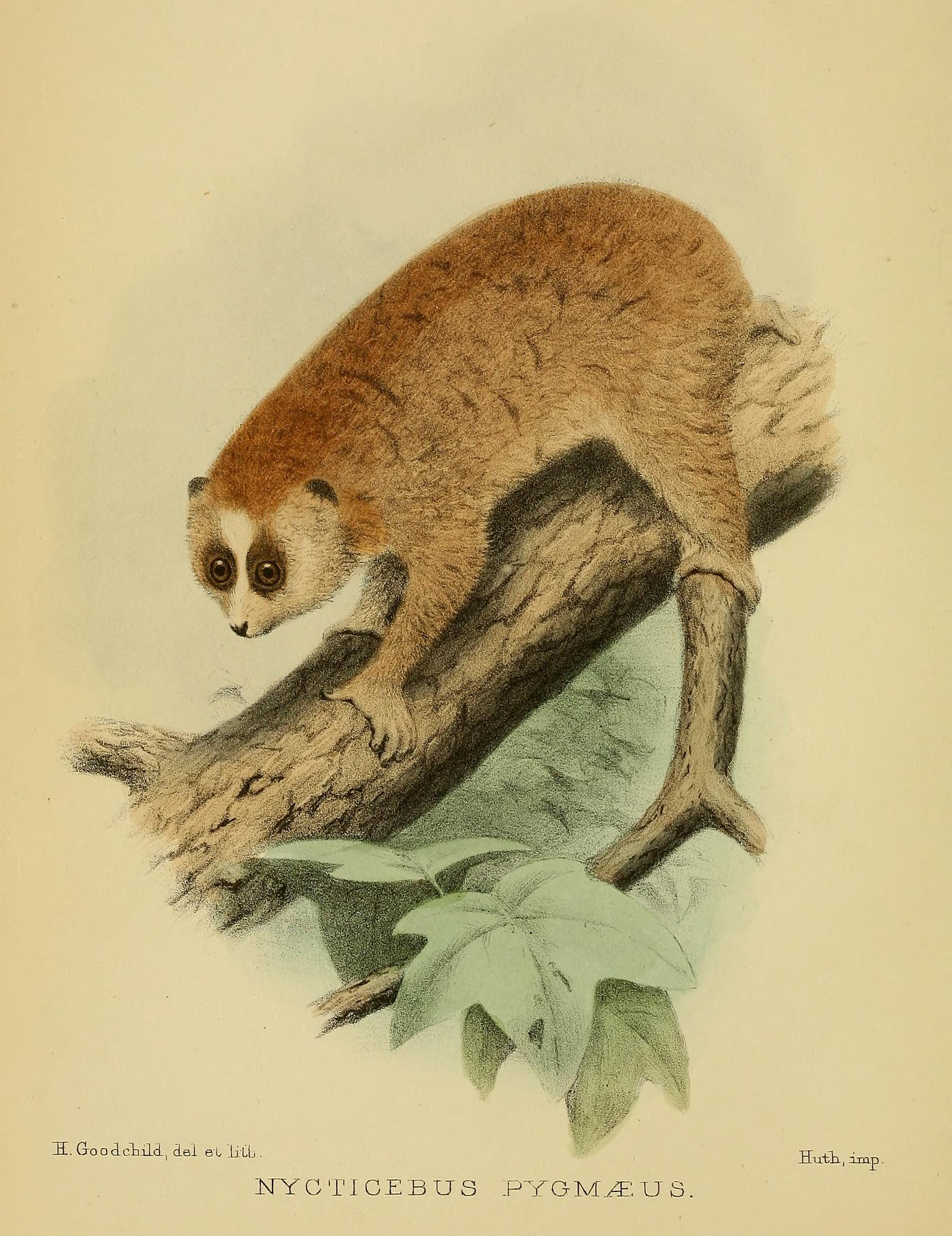
The pygmy slow loris as illustrated in Bonhote's 1907 description of the species

The pygmy slow loris was first described scientifically by J. Lewis Bonhote in 1907. The description was based on a male specimen sent to him by J. Vassal, a French physician who had collected the specimen from Nha Trang, Vietnam (then called Annam, a French Protectorate) in 1905. In 1939, Reginald Innes Pocock combined all slow lorises into a single species, Nycticebus coucang.

In an influential 1953 publication, primatologist William Charles Osman Hill also consolidated all the slow lorises in one species, Nycticebus coucang, and considered other forms distinct at the subspecies level. Osman Hill thus listed Nycticebus coucang pygmaeus, while acknowledging that "it may be deemed necessary to accede this form specific rank." In 1960, Dao Van Tien reported a species from Hòa Bình Province, Vietnam, that he called N. intermedius, but it turned out that his specimens were merely adults of the pygmy slow loris, which had originally been described on the basis of a juvenile. After studying slow lorises from Indochina, primatologist Colin Groves proposed that the pygmy slow loris was morphologically unique enough to be considered a distinct species. The validity of this opinion was later corroborated by studies of chromosomal structure, genetic distance determined by protein variation at polymorphic loci, and mitochondrial DNA restriction enzyme analysis. Nekaris and Nijman (2022) combined morphological, behavioural, karyotypical and genetic data and suggested that pygmy lorises are best placed in their own genus, Xanthonycticebus.

The phylogenetic relationships within the genus Nycticebus have been studied with modern molecular techniques, using DNA sequences derived from the mitochondrial DNA markers D-loop and cytochrome b from 22 slow loris individuals. In this analysis, most of the recognized lineages of Nycticebus, including the pygmy slow loris, were shown to be genetically distinct, and the species was shown to have diverged earlier than the other slow loris species, beginning perhaps 2.7 million years ago. Analysis of nucleotide sequence diversity from individuals taken from the boundary areas between southern China and Vietnam (a region of sympatry between the pygmy slow loris and the Bengal slow loris) show that the pygmy slow loris is not subject to the same introgressive hybridization as the Bengal slow loris (N. bengalensis). The authors of the study suggest that the low polymorphism of pygmy slow lorises may be due to a founder effect, and that the individuals they used in the study originate from an ancestor that lived in middle or southern Vietnam between 1860 and 7350 years ago.

== Description ==
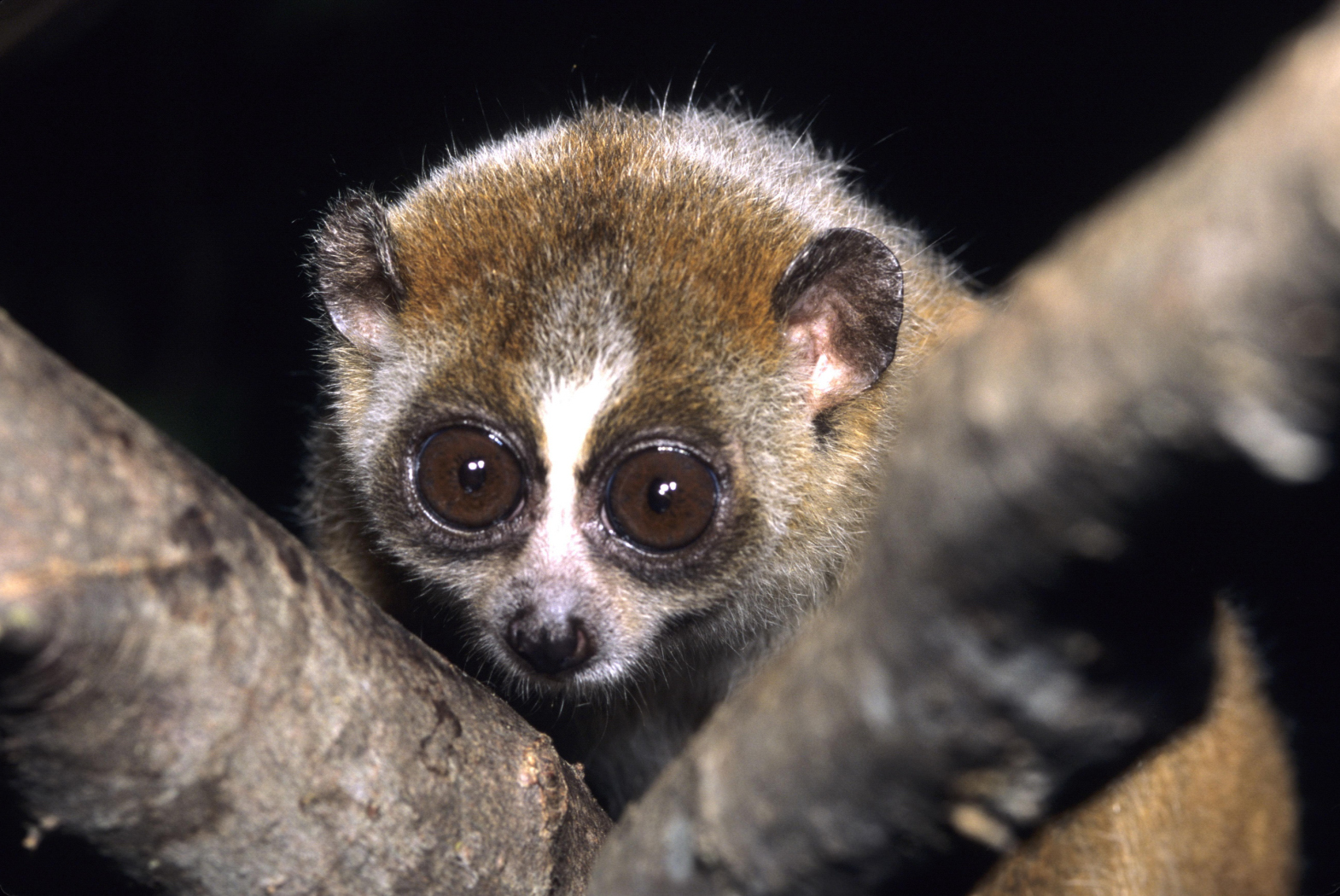
Facial features of the pygmy slow loris

The pygmy slow loris has a head and body length (measured from the top of the head to the base of the tail) of 195–230 mm (7.7–9.1 in); there is no significant difference in size between the sexes. The length of the skull is less than 55 mm (2.2 in). The tail is short, averaging 1.8 cm (0.71 in) in length. The bodyweight ranges between 360 and 580 g (13 and 20 oz), with an average mass of 420 g (15 oz) for males and 428 g (15.1 oz) for females. There are, however, large seasonal variations in bodyweight, and individuals up to 700 g (25 oz) have been recorded. The animal tends to have significantly higher bodyweights during the winter months, about 50 percent higher than the lowest values in the summer. The weight gains, achieved largely by increasing food intake, are triggered by changes in the length of the day and night. This seasonal change in bodyweight occurs in both sexes, in both pregnant and non-pregnant females—an adaptation thought to help ensure survival during winter when food resources become scarce. The species has distinctive teeth morphology: its third molar is triangular in outline and only slightly smaller than the first molar; its second molar is the largest. The incisors and canines on its lower jaw are procumbent (tilt forward) and together form a toothcomb that is used in grooming and feeding.

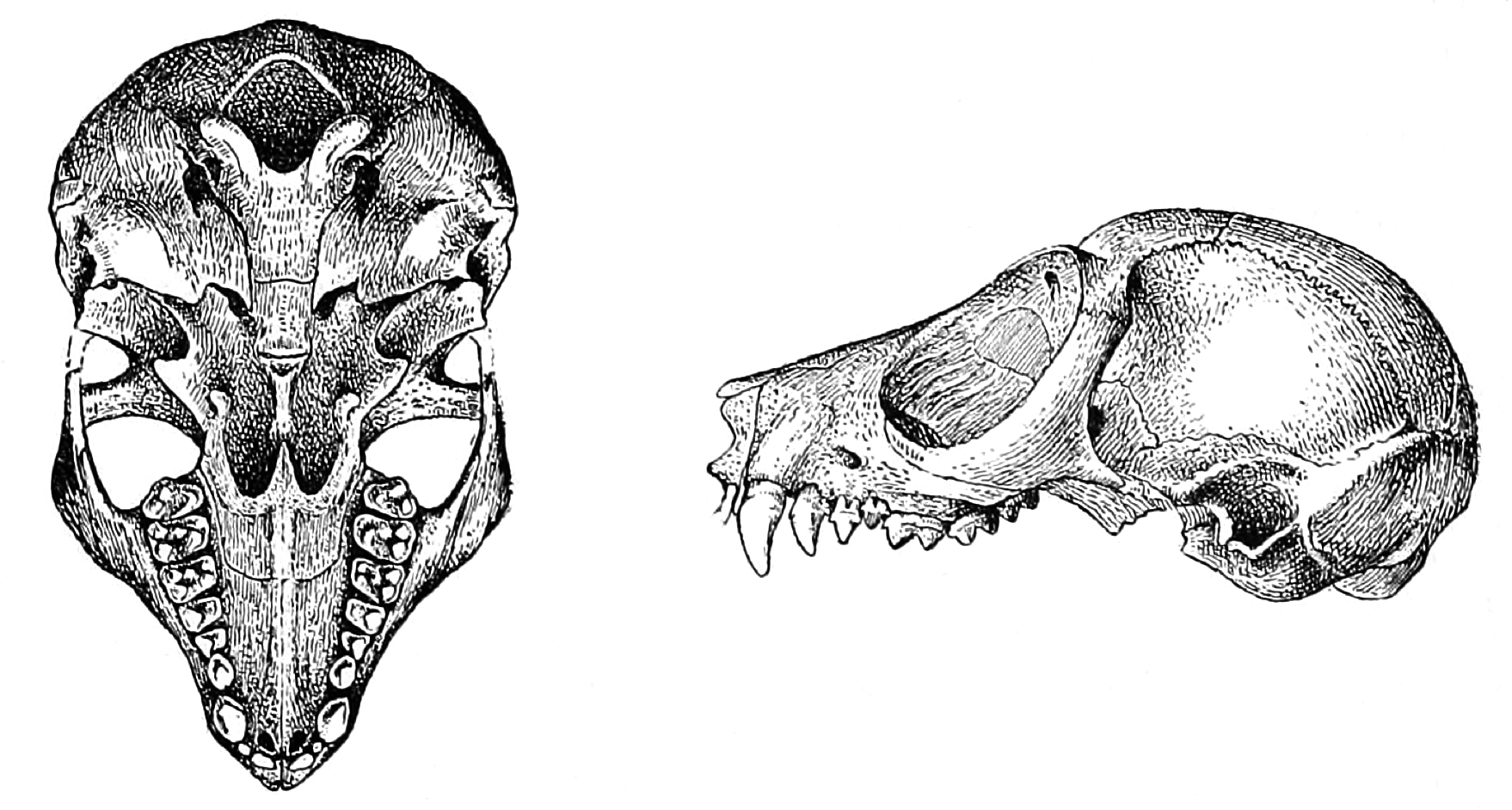
Palatal (left) and lateral (right) views of a pygmy slow loris skull

Like other strepsirrhine primates, the pygmy slow loris has tapeta lucida in its eyes to assist with night vision. In adults, the rings circling the eyes are seal brown; they are darker in young individuals. There is a white stripe extending from the nose to the forehead, and the sides of the head and upper lip are silvery gray, while the rest of the face and top of the head is rufous. It has small black ears, typically about 23 mm (0.91 in) long, which do not have fur on the tips. On the dorsal side of the animal, a rufous to brownish-black stripe runs from the nape to the middle of the lower back. The upper parts, including the shoulders and upper back, are russet to reddish-buff to brownish, and are sometimes "frosted" with silvery gray white hairs. The presence or absence of a dorsal stripe and silvery hair tips appear to be a seasonal variation and have led some to postulate the existence of an additional species, N. intermedius, although DNA analysis has since confirmed this to be an adult version of the pygmy slow loris. The pygmy slow loris has buffy flanks, paler than the back. The upper sides of the arms are ochraceous, and have silvery hairs mingled with the darker ones. The buff legs are also tipped with silvery white hairs. The underparts are plumbeous (lead-colored) at the base, with ochraceous apical portions. The hands and feet are silvery white, with yellowish-white nails. Foot length is relatively consistent, averaging about 45 mm (1.8 in).

The pygmy slow loris has a diploid chromosome number of 2n=50. Although the banding patterns on the chromosomes of all slow lorises are similar, this species may be distinguished from the Bengal slow loris (N. bengalensis) by distinct differences in the number and location of nucleolus organizer regions.

== Distribution and habitat ==
The pygmy slow loris is distributed east of the Mekong River in Vietnam, eastern Cambodia, Laos, and Yunnan province in southern China. In Laos, populations have been recorded in Phou Khaokhoay, Nam Kading, Nam Theun, Nakai–Nam Theun, Khammouane Limestone, Dakchung Plateau, and Bolaven Northeast. In Vietnam, the pygmy slow loris was widespread throughout the country, but concern is increasing with conservation and rehabilitation efforts in Cat Tien National Park. Its encounter rate, determined from two field studies from Laos and Vietnam combined, was 0.05–0.08 lorises/km. In Cambodia, this value ranged from 0 in Mondulkiri Protected Forest to 0.10 in Phnom Prich Wildlife Sanctuary. In China, it has been recorded only in Pingbian, Hekou, Jinping, and Lüchun counties of Yunnan. It inhabits semi-evergreen, secondary, and Temperate broadleaf and mixed forests.

== Behavior and ecology ==
The pygmy slow loris is nocturnal, although it is least active on cold, moonlit nights and is generally active on dark nights, regardless of temperature. In the wild, it is normally encountered alone, or in small groups of two to four individuals. Males use scent marking to defend territories and mark their boundaries. Females prefer to mate with males whose scent is familiar. Males will also countermark—mark over or adjacent to another individual's mark deposited earlier—to advertise competitive ability to females. Females actively prefer countermarking males to males whose odors have been countermarked.

The pygmy slow loris produces an apocrine secretion on scent glands near their elbow (brachial glands). This clear liquid, when mixed with its saliva, creates a volatile, noxious toxin. When startled, the slow loris licks its brachial glands and applies the secretion to its head. The oily secretion contains a complex mixture of volatile and semi-volatile components; one chemical analysis indicated over 200 components were present. One of the components is a member of the secretoglobin family of proteins, and similar to an allergenic protein found in cat dander. The similarity between the brachial gland secretions and domestic cat allergens may account for anaphylaxis in susceptible individuals.

Vocalizations of the pygmy slow loris include a short whistle, mother-infant contact calls, and a whistling sound produced during estrus.

=== Reproduction ===
The female is mildly aggressive to her suitors during estrus, and will often lunge at males, usually after a long period of being approached and followed. Vocalizations during mating include a whistling sound, most commonly by the female, usually during June and August, coinciding with female estrus. Other vocalizations recorded during estrus include chittering and growling. The testosterone levels of the males are seasonal, with peaks coinciding with female estrogen peaks.

The pygmy slow loris can conceive by 18 months and give birth to its first offspring by two years of age. Breed registry entries show that the youngest male to sire offspring was around 18 months of age, and the youngest female conceived at 16 months. Gestation length is 184–200 days, and the lactation period lasts 123–146 days. Offspring are weaned at about 24 weeks of age. The pygmy slow loris is monoestrous, experiencing a single four- to five-day period of reproductive activity between late July and early October in captivity, with births occurring from early February to mid-March. As a result, opportunities for mating are rare, and females rely heavily on scent to assess mate quality. Females show a strong preference for familiar-smelling males over novel-smelling males. Research on the process of sexual selection in primates suggests that the exclusive presence of one male's scent in the area is a reliable cue that he is capable of defending the area and/or preventing rival males from marking. Pygmy slow lorises usually have a litter size of one or two; separate studies have reported frequencies of twinning as either 50% or 100% of births. Data collected from a seven-year captive breeding program indicates that they have a skewed birth sex ratio of 1 female to 1.68 males. Because they must divide time equally between offspring, mothers of twins spend less time engaging in social grooming and play with their young, which may lead to a lower infant survival rate. Mothers will "park" their young at one week of age while foraging, and the young begin following their mothers at about two weeks. The life span of the pygmy slow loris is about 20 years.

=== Diet ===
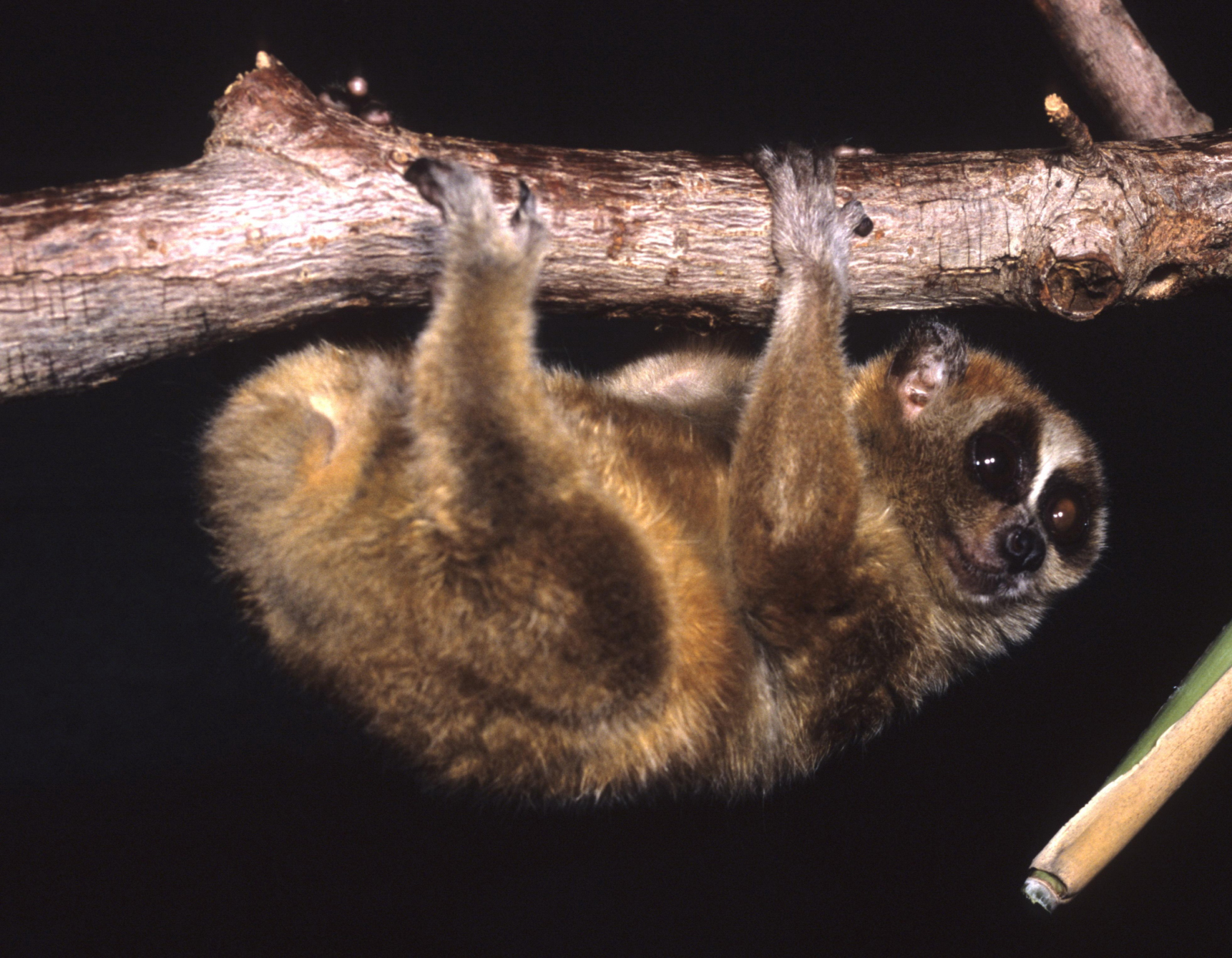
Insect prey can be captured while hanging upside-down from a branch.

The pygmy slow loris is omnivorous, feeding on termites, ants, other insects, and fruit. Insects are captured with one or both hands while standing or hanging upside-down from a branch. Insect prey is typically consumed at heights less than 10 m (33 ft). A Vietnamese study concluded that the diet of the pygmy slow loris consists largely of tree exudates (gum) (63%) and animal prey (33%), with other food types making up the remainder. A study on recently reintroduced individuals found similar results—40% insects, 30% gum, and 30% other exudates. The pygmy slow loris will gouge trees to feed on the released exudates. Although tree gum is not as nutrient-rich as its preferred diet, it is available year-round. The pygmy slow loris is a specialized gummivore, a trait that helps it overcome difficulties in finding food during times of shortage. Unable to leap from tree to tree, the pygmy slow loris has a restricted range from which it may obtain food sources. Having generalist dietary preferences allows them to overcome difficult environmental conditions; gum allows them to live at a low energy level with a reduced metabolism. Trees from which exudates are eaten are from the following families: Sapindaceae (Sapindus), Euphorbiaceae (Vernicia), Fabaceae (Saraca), Anacardiaceae (Spondias), and Burseraceae. Feeding on gum takes place over a time period ranging from one to twenty minutes and involves intense licking, sometimes accompanied by audible scratching and bark-breaking sounds. Feeding on exudates usually occurs at heights over 8 m (26 ft). The seasonal color variation that occur in the dorsal stripe of Vietnamese individuals may be related to the need to engage in exudate feeding.

The diet of the pygmy slow loris is seasonal. In north Vietnam, for example, the winter is characterized by low rainfalls and temperatures as low as 5 °C in the north of its range, when there is little growth of vegetation in forests, few insects, and limited food resources. The pygmy slow loris will also consume insects that have been exposed by its bamboo-gouging activities. It will use its toothcomb to clean an area of lichens and fungi prior to gouging. The animals conserve energy in the colder winter months by reducing movement, often to the point of complete inactivity.

== Conservation ==
The pygmy slow loris has declined in numbers as a result of extensive habitat degradation throughout its range, including north-eastern Cambodia, the Yunnan Province of China, and Vietnam. In Yunnan province, nearly all primary evergreen forests have vanished and secondary forests have been heavily degraded; as of 2005, forest cover has been reduced by 42% since the mid-1990s. The use of defoliants, such as Agent Orange, during the Vietnam War and the ongoing clearing of forests in Vietnam have resulted in a considerable loss of habitat. As of 2003, the forest cover had been reduced to 30% of its original area, with only 10% of the remaining forest consisting of the closed-canopy forests preferred by the pygmy slow loris.

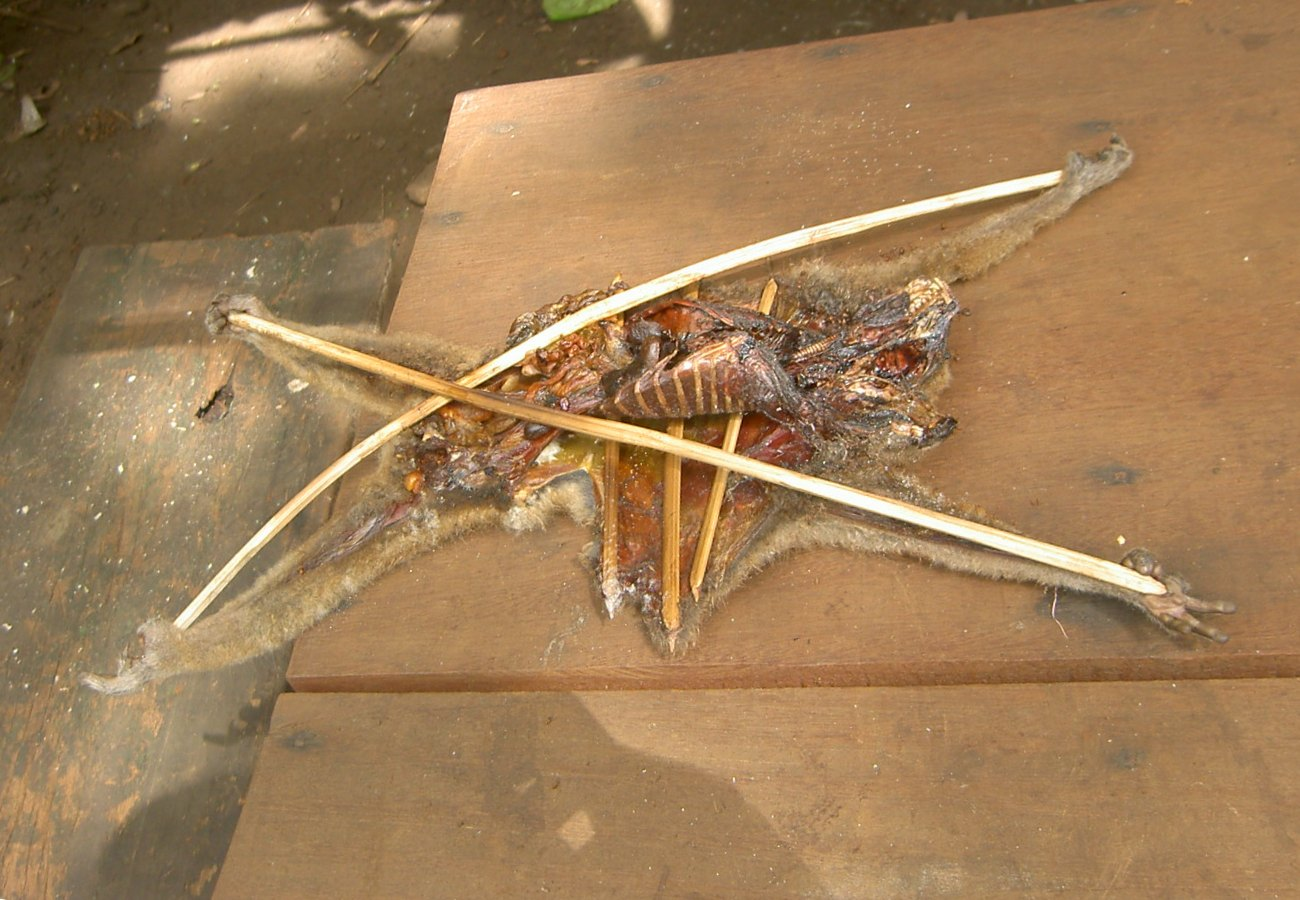
The pygmy slow loris is captured for use in traditional medicine throughout its range.

Due to a combination of unstable political situations in its range, and its nocturnal, arboreal lifestyle, population data for the pygmy slow loris are scarce. The population in China has been estimated at less than 500 individuals. In the 1980s, one estimate placed the population at roughly 72,000 individuals, while another estimate from the same period placed the number around 600–700 individuals. This enormous discrepancy underlines the difficulty to calculate population size without detailed field studies. In Laos, the wildlife status report of 1999 describes the species as "little known" and "common", based on availability of potential habitat. In 2020 the IUCN classified the pygmy slow loris as endangered, as did the Vietnam Red Data Book the same year. The European Union (EU) (2005) describes the population status in Laos as "apparently widespread, but not common anywhere".

In addition to habitat destruction, the pygmy slow loris is seriously threatened by hunting and trade. Within its geographic range and neighbor countries, the trade in the pygmy slow loris has recently increased due to economic changes and human population growth, and the trend is expected to continue. Decreased sightings in the field and at animal markets indicate that wild populations are being depleted since the low reproduction rate of the pygmy slow loris cannot keep pace with these large-scale off-takes. Accordingly, conservationists and field biologists fear local extinctions in the near future. Between 1998 and 2006, 70% of pygmy slow lorises seized by authorities died before reaching a sheltering zoo, resulting in replacement demand and additional captures from the wild.

Within the whole Indochinese region, populations of the pygmy slow loris have drastically decreased as a result of military activities, defoliant spraying, logging, and massive off-takes, especially in Vietnam. It has been extirpated in the northern part of this country due to the belief that it is a crop pest. The demand of the pet and the medicinal markets is further aggravating the situation, which is reflected by its abundance in many local markets. This demand has recently increased due to human population growth and improved economic conditions within the region. According to CITES, this activity is considered unsustainable.

The population in southern China has been reduced to a few hundred individuals, and by another report, may be locally extinct. The decreasing number of pygmy slow lorises for sale corroborates reports of rapid declines in Vietnamese populations. By 2007, field sightings were becoming scarce, and there were reports that it had disappeared from large parts of its range, particularly in areas with intense logging and agriculture. In Cambodia, widespread declines have been associated with increases in hunting pressure during 2001 and 2002. In one field survey, three areas with high encounter rates in early 2008 were resurveyed in late 2008 and 2009, but no individuals were encountered. This change was thought to be due to both high hunting pressures and gold mine development.

Both the Bengal slow loris and pygmy slow loris are found in more than 20 protected areas, although their populations are either low or insufficiently recorded. The pygmy slow loris is protected in most of its range states: in Cambodia, China, and Vietnam. This makes hunting and capture illegal, and in China and Vietnam, possession and storage are also illegal. Under Vietnamese law it has had the highest level of wildlife protection since 1992, all exploitation and use of the pygmy slow loris is illegal. However, enforcement is poor while minor penalties have little deterring effect. In terms of international protection, the species was elevated to Appendix I of CITES in 2007. In addition, since October 2001, the European Union prohibits imports for all wild specimens of pygmy slow loris from Laos and Cambodia for conservation reasons.

The species has been recorded in at least 6 national parks and 12 nature reserves. In China, Daweishan, Fenshuiling, and Huanglianshan Reserve maintained approximately 80% of that country's population of the species in 2007. However, the species is still vulnerable to hunting, even in protected areas. In Laos, the species has been recorded in seven National Biodiversity Conservation Areas.

In Vietnam, confiscated pygmy lorises are usually taken to the Endangered Primate Rescue Centre in Cúc Phương National Park, to be reintroduced into the wild. Non-experts may find it difficult to distinguish between the pygmy slow loris and the Sunda slow loris, as both have similarly reddish fur, which is variable in colors. In international shipments, pygmy lorises may be even mixed up with pottos or lemurs.

=== Trade ===
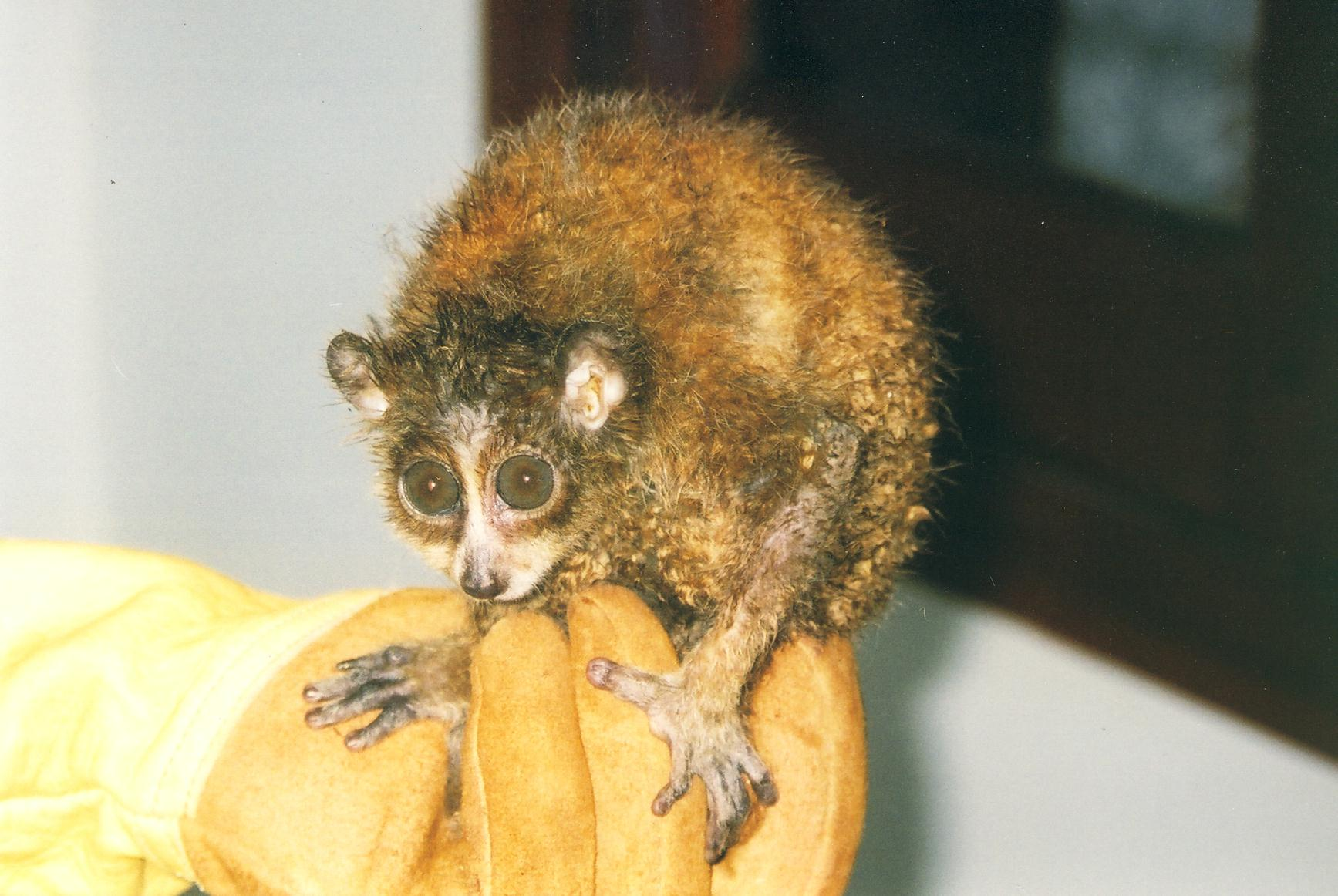
Pygmy slow lorises obtained from animal markets suffer from stress, neglect, malnutrition, and infection. As a consequence, they seldom live long.

The pygmy slow loris is traded mainly for its purported medicinal properties, for the pet trade, or, to a lesser extent, as food for local consumption. According to a 2003 report, the animals were sold for 30,000–50,000 Vietnamese đồng (US$1.50–2.50 or €1.10–1.80). Other reports have found them to cost US$2–10. In Cambodia, the species is used in Traditional Khmer Medicine. Surveys conducted at Cambodian markets showed that the species was the third most common mammal for sale, offered at prices ranging from US$0.85–6.25 (€0.65–4.70). In Vietnam, the pygmy slow loris is used for food, medicine, and often as a pet and is among the most frequently sold species. Formerly, hundreds of pygmy lorises were traded monthly in major markets, but recently numbers seem to have decreased, due to shortages in supply. In southern Vietnam, lorises are among the most popular wildlife dishes in wildlife meat restaurants.

Exporting countries reported a total of 111 pygmy slow lorises traded internationally between 1977 and 2004, whereas importing countries reported 131 animals. In Laos, large numbers of native lorises are exported to Vietnam. In Japan, pet shops occasionally offer pygmy slow lorises for US$2,000–3,800 (€1,500–2,800).

There are also parts and derivatives of pygmy lorises in trade, such as the skin and the hair. All parts of the animal are used in traditional Khmer medicine. In Vietnam, medicine such as bone glue of monkey, is mainly produced by local people, but a smaller portion is also destined for restaurants or sold to visitors. The species is especially used for the assumed medicinal value of its hair. Traders have reported that they have difficulty keeping pace with demand—one trader claimed to have sold nearly 1,200 pygmy slow lorises during 2001–2002. In Cambodia, the deeply rooted tradition of using the Bengal and pygmy slow loris in traditional medicine is widespread, and the pygmy slow loris is the most commonly requested animal in traditional medicine shops in Cambodia's capital, Phnom Penh.

Illegal trade routes are known to exist from Cambodia, to Laos, Thailand, and Vietnam, with much of this trade destined for China. Surveys from 1998 and 1999 show that 80 to 90 animals were imported from Vietnam though Hekou Port into Yunnan province, making it the most commonly recorded animal in the surveys. China is the primary destination of most Vietnamese slow lorises, although they are also smuggled to other countries, including Taiwan. In one noted incident, 102 animals were confiscated during transit to Ho Chi Minh City in August 1993; of these, only four survived. Pygmy lorises may cost up to US$400 on the Taiwanese pet market. In the USA, occasionally, pygmy lorises smuggled from Vietnam have been confiscated. The Endangered Primate Rescue Centre reports that the pygmy slow loris is the most often rescued species, which reflects their abundance in trade. In Europe, illegal purchases have been reported from Germany, the Netherlands, Poland, and Moscow.

== In captivity ==
The first documented pygmy slow loris in North America was kept at Hawaii's Honolulu Zoo in 1968. In 1986, about 37 pygmy lorises were exported from Vietnam and Laos to Sweden. A year later, several pairs caught from the wild were transferred to zoos in Cincinnati, San Diego, and the Duke Lemur Center. In 1994, the Association of Zoos and Aquariums established a Species Survival Plan for the species, following a proposal by the Global Captive Action Plan for Primates to create a breeding program to maintain its genetic diversity. As of 2008, the captive population in North America had grown to 74 individuals, with most of them born at the San Diego Zoo; as of 2013, the species is the most common lorisid primate kept in North American zoos. About 175 pygmy lorises live in breeding facilities worldwide.
