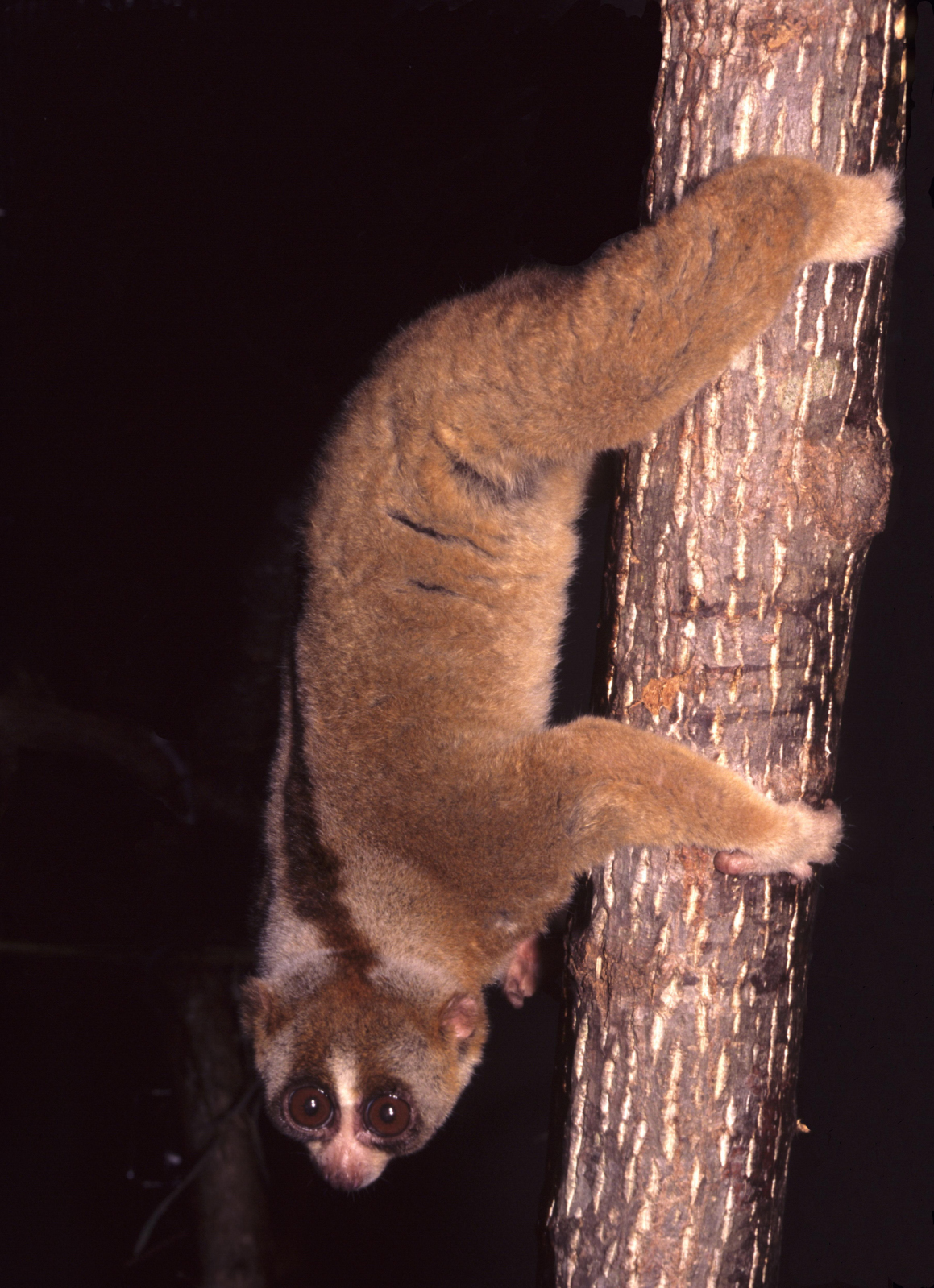

Conservation status
- Endangered (IUCN 3.1)
- CITES Appendix I

Scientific classification
- Kingdom: Animalia
- Phylum: Chordata
- Class: Mammalia
- Order: Primates
- Suborder: Strepsirrhini
- Family: Lorisidae
- Genus: Nycticebus
- Species: N. coucang

Binomial name
- Nycticebus coucang (Boddaert, 1785)
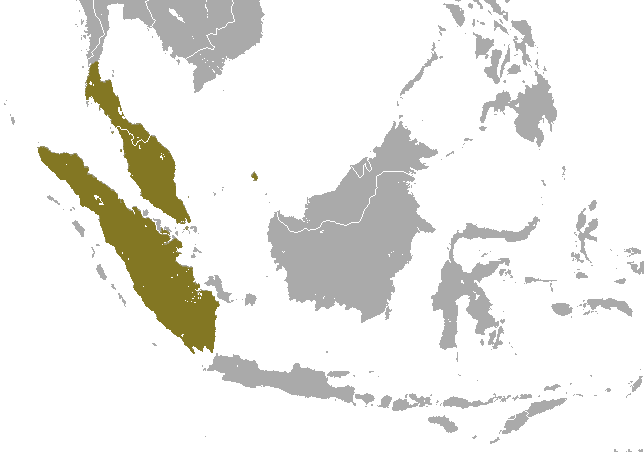
- Sunda slow loris range

Synonyms
- Bradylemur tardigradus var. B. (Lesson, 1840); Kra Buku (Raffles 1821); Lemur tardigradus Raffles, 1821: (Not Linnaeus, 1758); N. coucang brachycephalus Sody, 1949; N. c. buku Robinson, 1917 (Note: In 1917, Robinson used the name buku, attributed to Ruffles 1821; however, the name buku as originally applied did not refer to a loris.); N. c. hilleri Stone and Rehn, 1902; N. c. insularis Robinson, 1917; N. c. natunae Stone and Rehn, 1902; N. Sumatrensis Ludeking, 1867: (nomen nudum); N. tardigradus var malaiana Anderson, 1881; N. t. malayanus (Lydekker, 1904); Tardigradus coucang Boddaert, 1785: (no locality)

= Sunda slow loris =

Species of primate found in South East Asia

The Sunda slow loris (Nycticebus coucang), or greater slow loris, is a strepsirrhine primate and a species of slow loris native to Indonesia, West Malaysia, southern Thailand and Singapore. It measures 27 to 38 cm (11 to 15 in) from head to tail and weighs between 599 and 685 g (21.1 and 24.2 oz). Like other slow lorises, it has a wet nose (rhinarium), a round head, small ears hidden in thick fur, a flat face, large eyes and a vestigial tail.

The Sunda slow loris is nocturnal and arboreal, typically occurring in evergreen forests. It prefers rainforests with continuous dense canopies and has an extremely low metabolic rate compared to other mammals of its size. Its diet consists of sap, floral nectar, fruit and arthropods, and will feed on exudates such as gum and sap by licking wounds in trees. Individuals are generally solitary, with one study showing only 8% of its active time was spent near other individuals. It has a monogamous mating system with the offspring living with the parents. It sleeps during the day, rolled up in a ball in hidden parts of trees above the ground, often on branches, twigs, palm fronds, or lianas. The species is polyoestrous, usually giving birth to a single offspring after a gestation period of 192 days. The young disperses between 16 and 27 months, generally when it is sexually mature.

The species is listed as endangered on the IUCN Red List. It is threatened with extinction due to a growing demand in the exotic pet trade, and has become one of the most abundant primate species on sale at Indonesian pet markets. Its teeth are often pulled out before being sold as pets which can result in infection and/or death. Lack of teeth makes reintroduction to the wild impossible. It also suffers from habitat loss, which has been severe in the areas in which it is found.

== Etymology ==
The common name, Sunda slow loris, refers to the Sunda Islands, a group of islands in the western part of the Malay Archipelago where it is found. Another common name for the species is the greater slow loris. The specific name, coucang, derives from kukang, its common name in Indonesia. It is commonly known as malu-malu, meaning "shy" in Indonesian, and also as bukang or Kalamasan. It is sometimes called kuskus, because local people do not distinguish between the slow loris and cuscus, a group of Australasian possums. In Malaysia they are sometimes known as kongkang or kera duku; kera is Malay for monkey while duku is the fruit-bearing tree, Lansium parasiticum. In Thailand, it is called ling lom (ลิงลม), which translates as "wind monkey".

== Taxonomy and phylogeny ==
The Sunda slow loris was first described (in part) in 1785 by the Dutch physician and naturalist Pieter Boddaert under the name Tardigradus coucang. However, its discovery dates to 1770, when the Dutchman Arnout Vosmaer (1720–1799) described a specimen of it as a type of sloth. Vosmaer gave it the French name "le paresseux pentadactyle du Bengale" ("the five-fingered sloth of Bengal"), but Boddaert later argued that it was more closely aligned with the lorises of Ceylon (now Sri Lanka) and Bengal.

Between 1800 and 1907, several other slow loris species were described, but in 1953 the primatologist William Charles Osman Hill, in his influential book, Primates: Comparative Anatomy and Taxonomy, consolidated all the slow lorises into a single species, N. coucang. In 1971 Colin Groves recognized the pygmy slow loris (N. pygmaeus) as a separate species, and divided N. coucang into four subspecies. In 2001 Groves opined that there were three species (N. coucang, N. pygmaeus, and N. bengalensis), and that N. coucang itself had three subspecies (Nycticebus coucang coucang, N. c. menagensis, and N. c. javanicus). These three subspecies were promoted in 2010 to species status—the Sunda slow loris, the Javan slow loris (N. javanicus) and Bornean slow loris (N. menagensis). Species differentiation was based largely on differences in morphology, such as size, fur color, and head markings. (At the end of 2012, the Bornean slow loris was itself divided into four distinct species.)

When Étienne Geoffroy Saint-Hilaire defined the genus Nycticebus in 1812, he made the Sunda slow loris the type species. This was questioned in 1921 by British zoologist Oldfield Thomas, who noted that there was some confusion over which specimen was used as the type specimen. Instead, he suggested that the type specimen was actually the Bengal slow loris, Lori bengalensis Lacépède, 1800. There was further confusion during the 1800s when Boddaert's Tardigradus coucang was routinely mistaken for Carl Linnaeus' Lemur tardigradus – a species he had described in the 10th edition of Systema Naturæ (1758) The fact that Lemur tardigradus was actually a slender loris remained obscured until 1902, when mammalogists Witmer Stone and James A. G. Rehn finally cleared the air.

The species has 50 chromosomes (2n=50), and it genome size is 3.58 pg. Of its chromosomes, 22 are metacentric, 26 are submetacentric, and none are acrocentric. Its X chromosome is submetacentric, and its Y chromosome is metacentric.

To help clarify species and subspecies boundaries, and to establish whether morphology-based classifications were consistent with evolutionary relationships, the phylogenetic relationships within the genus Nycticebus have been investigated using DNA sequences derived from the mitochondrial markers D-loop and cytochrome b. Although most of the recognized lineages of Nycticebus (including the pygmy slow loris (N. pygmaeus), Bornean slow loris (N. menagensis) and the Javan slow loris (N. javanicus)) were shown to be genetically distinct, the analysis suggested that DNA sequences from selected individuals of Sunda slow loris (N. coucang) and Bengal slow loris (N. bengalensis) shared a closer evolutionary relationship with each other than with other members of their own respective species. The authors suggest that this result may be explained by introgressive hybridization, as the tested individuals of these two taxa originated from a region of sympatry in southern Thailand; the precise origin of one of the N. coucang individuals was not known. This hypothesis was corroborated by a 2007 study that compared the variations in mitochondrial DNA sequences between N. bengalensis and N. coucang, and suggested that there has indeed been gene flow between the two species.

== Anatomy and physiology ==
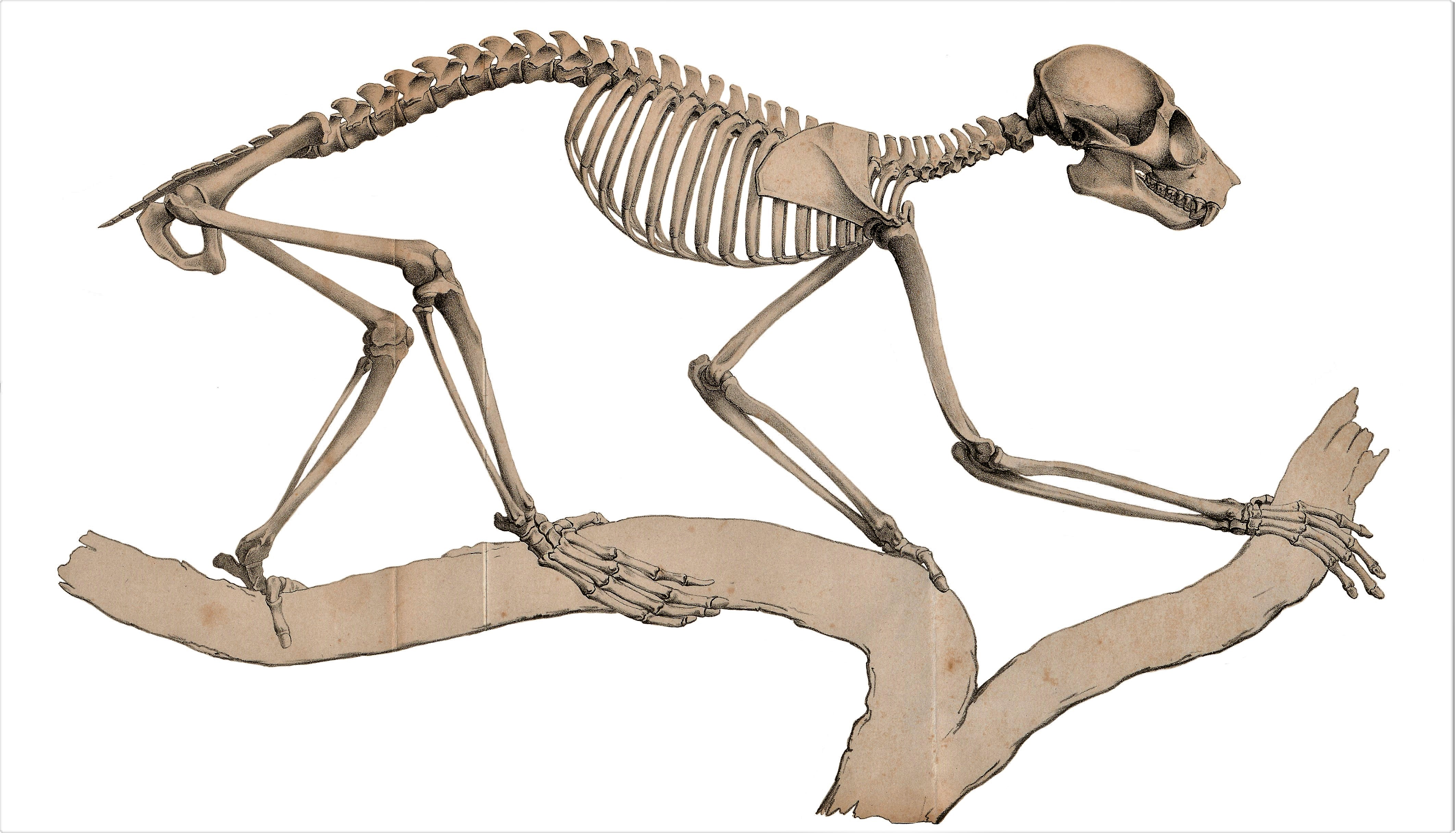
Skeleton

The Sunda slow loris has dark rings around its large eyes, a white nose with a whitish strip that extends to the forehead and a dark stripe that stretches from the back of the head along the spine. Its soft, thick, woolly fur ranges from light brown to deep reddish brown, with a lighter underside. The species is distinct from the Bengal slow loris due to the dark inverse teardrop markings around the eyes which meet the dark dorsal stripe on the back of the head. It tends to have a much more distinct white stripe between the eyes, more distinct dark coloring around the eyes, and a browner coat than the Bengal slow loris which is larger, grayer, and shows less contrast. The Sunda slow loris has less white facial coloring than the much smaller pygmy slow loris. Local color variations are known to occur.

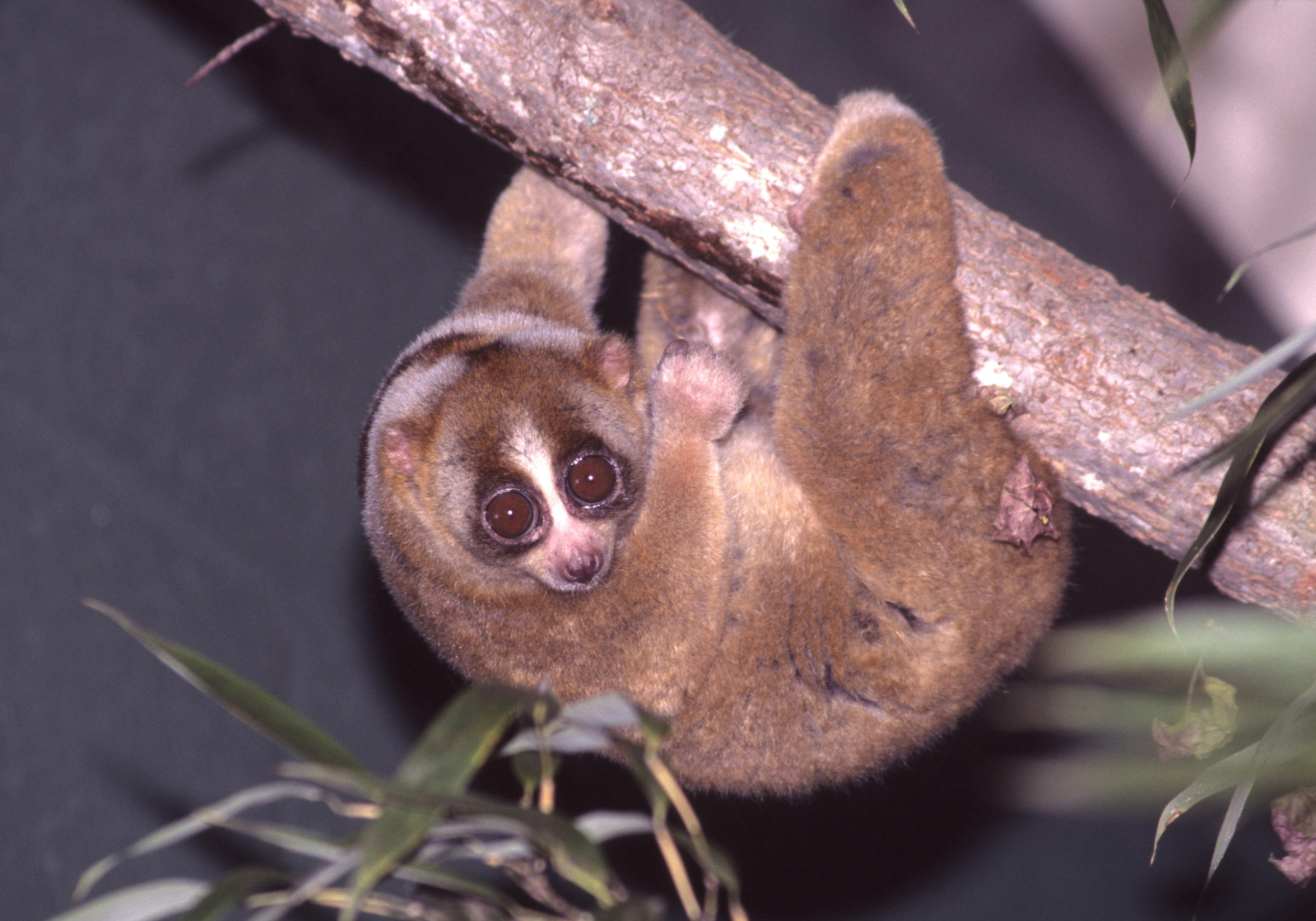
The Sunda slow loris generally holds branches with at least three limbs at one time.

It measures between 27 and 38 centimetres (11 and 15 in) and weighs 599 and 685 grams (21.1 and 24.2 oz). Unlike the Bengal slow loris, the Sunda slow loris does not show sexual dimorphism by weight. The vestigial tail, hidden beneath the fur, is reduced to a stump. It has a toothcomb, six forward-facing teeth on the bottom jaw, which includes the lower incisors and the canine teeth. The structure is generally used for grooming in other strepsirhine primates, but lorises also use it to scrape off gum when foraging. It has a shortened second digit, and the hands have a strong grip. Like other lorises, it excretes a strong-smelling liquid from glands beneath its arms which is used in communication.

One major distinguishing feature between all loris species is locomotion: the Sunda slow loris moves slowly through trees on all four limbs, typically with three limbs attached to a support at a time. Its movement has been described as unique; similar to crawling, or as if it was climbing in every direction, the Sunda slow loris changes direction or moves between branches with little noise or change in speed. In captivity, about a quarter of its time is spent moving quadrupedally, a quarter suspended or hanging, a quarter climbing, and a quarter clasping multiple branches (bridging). It may hang below a branch by one or both feet for long periods of time.

== Behavior and ecology ==
Like other slow lorises, the Sunda slow loris is an arboreal and nocturnal primate, resting by day in the forks of trees, or in thick vegetation and feeding on fruit and insects by night. Unlike other loris species, it remains in trees most of its life: while the Bengal slow loris will often sleep on the ground, the Sunda slow loris sleeps in a ball in branches or foliage. It usually sleeps alone but has been observed to sleep with several conspecifics (individuals of the same species), including other adults. Adults live in overlapping ranges of 0.004 to 0.25 km^{2} (0.0015 to 0.0965 mi^{2}).

Despite its slow metabolism rate, the Sunda slow loris has a high-energy diet. Its slow lifestyle may be due to the energy costs of detoxifying certain secondary plant compounds in many genera of food plants their diets. The largest amount of time is spent eating phloem sap (34.9%), floral nectar and nectar-producing plant parts (31.7%), and fruits (22.5%). It also consumes gums and arthropods such as spiders and insects. Gum is taken by licking wounds on trees. They are also known to feed on molluscs, including the giant land snail Achatina fulica, and birds' eggs.

All slow loris species produce a toxin in glands on the insides of their elbows. This is spread across their bodies and those of their offspring using the toothcomb while grooming. When threatened with predators, the Sunda slow loris can bite, roll into a ball exposing its toxic saliva-covered fur, or roll up and drop from the trees. However, the primary method of predator avoidance is crypsis, whereby it hides. The Asiatic reticulated python, the changeable hawk-eagle and the Sumatran orangutan have been recorded as predators of the Sunda slow loris.

=== Social systems ===
The Sunda slow loris may fit into the monogamous single male/single female social system, though are mainly known to be solitary. One study showed only 8% of the species' active time was spent near other individuals. Where home ranges overlap, spatial groups are formed. These groups consist of one male, one female and up to three younger individuals. The interactions between these individuals are largely friendly; they include allogrooming, following, pant-growling, and click-calling, although social behaviors only make up around 3% of the activity budget. When it comes into contact with conspecifics from other home ranges there is usually no reaction as home ranges are not defended. In captivity however, it can be aggressive with other individuals. Males have shown antagonistic behaviors such as attacks, pursuits, threats, assertion, fighting, and subordination. The fighting often results in serious injury. Despite this, they are known to be generally sociable in captivity, with allogrooming being the most common social behavior.

=== Communication ===
There are eight distinct call types made by Sunda slow loris adults, which can be divided into two categories: contact and contact-seeking calls such as whistles and short keckers (a social play and attention-seeking call), and aggressive and defensive calls such as long keckers, screams, snarls and grunts. Because they rely on crypsis to avoid predators, they do not make alarm calls. Infants emit clicks and squeaks when disturbed. During estrus, females make whistle calls when in visual contact with a male. When exploring new environments and during handling, it makes ultrasonic vocalisations out of the human hearing range.

Olfactory communication is very important in this species. It has roles in alerting others of the identity, physical state and position of the individual. It is also important in reproduction. Like other slow lorises, the Sunda slow loris has glands on its elbows that exude oils. The gland is licked to spread scent and is thought to have evolved for communication, but it is toxic to humans. If the person is allergic to the animal they can go into shock and could even die. It also has glands on its anus and can signal conspecifics by perineal rubbing which deposits urine. When it locates the scent of another slow loris it may rub its face on the substrate where the scent was found. The Sunda slow loris may grin or bare its teeth. When stressed, infants may grin, while adults bear their teeth to show aggression or fear, but also during play.

=== Reproduction ===
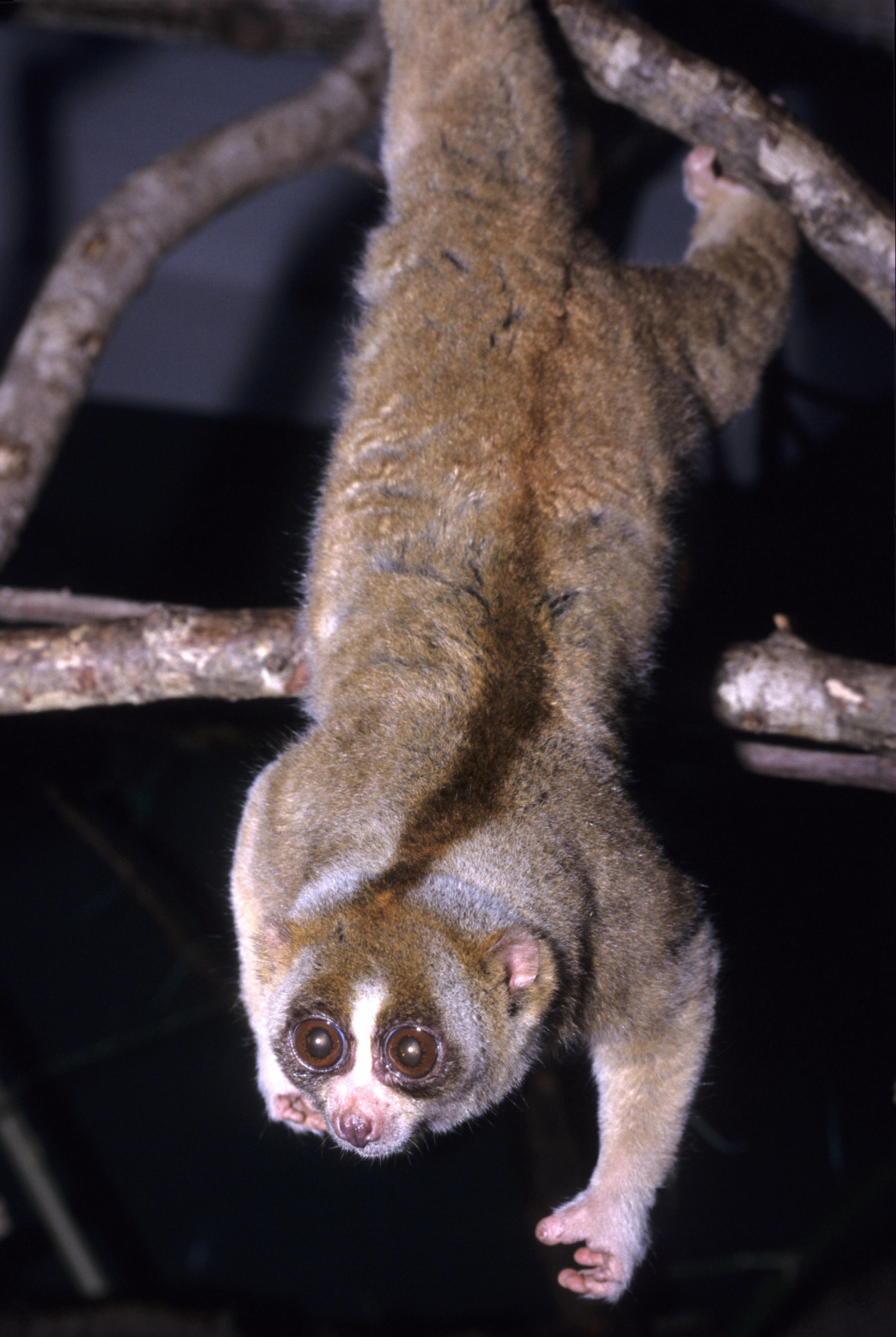
Females hang from branches during copulation.

Reproduction is one of the few times the Sunda slow loris aggregates with conspecifics, as it is largely solitary. One study recorded that the most slow lorises ever seen together was six; this appeared to be a female in estrus and five males following her. This may suggest a more promiscuous mating system, where females mate with more than one male. Despite this, its testis size is small compared with similar sized promsimians, which is indicative of monogamy. In the wild the mating system of the Sunda slow loris is thought to vary between populations.

Sexual maturity is reached between the ages of 18 and 24 months in females, and can be reached by 17 months in males. It is polyestrous, having many periods of sexual receptivity during a year. In captivity however, there is a clear birth peak between March and May. It has been observed that reproductive patterns of captive prosimians in the northern hemisphere are altered. The estrus cycle lasts 29–45 days, with most copulations occurring on the same day.

Females in estrus are followed by males, with copulation initiated by the female. The female will hang from a branch and may vocalise. The male will hold the female and the branch and copulate with her. Urine-marking and vocalising are also used by the female to solicit mating. The male may create a mating plug following copulation.

The gestation period averages 192.2 days, after which one young is born, although twinning has been observed. Both males and females will disperse in the wild, this occurs between 16 and 27 months.

== Distribution and habitat ==
The Sunda slow loris is found in continuous canopy tropical rainforests. It is adaptable and will also live in other types of habitat. It is found in Indonesia, on the islands of Sumatra, Batam and Galang in the Riau Archipelago, and Tebing Tinggi Island and Great Natuna (Bunguran) in the Natuna Islands; in Malaysia on the Malay Peninsula and Pulau Tioman; in the southern peninsular of Thailand; and Singapore.

Despite being presumed extinct in Pulau Tioman, records indicate that slow lorises may still inhabit the island. The facial markings and morphology of the Tioman slow loris are substantially different from mainland individuals, which hints at the potential distinctiveness of the population.

The Sunda slow loris is sympatric (shares its range) with the Bengal slow loris in Thailand and hybridisation has occurred.

== Conservation ==
According to the 2020 International Union for Conservation of Nature (IUCN) Red List assessment, the Sunda slow loris was evaluated as endangered. In June 2007 it was transferred from CITES Appendix II to Appendix I, indicating a true concern about the state of international trade in this species, an act now forbidden by international law. It is also protected by Indonesian law, though the law does not seem to be strictly enforced. Its population size is unknown and further studies need to be carried out to confirm their conservation status.

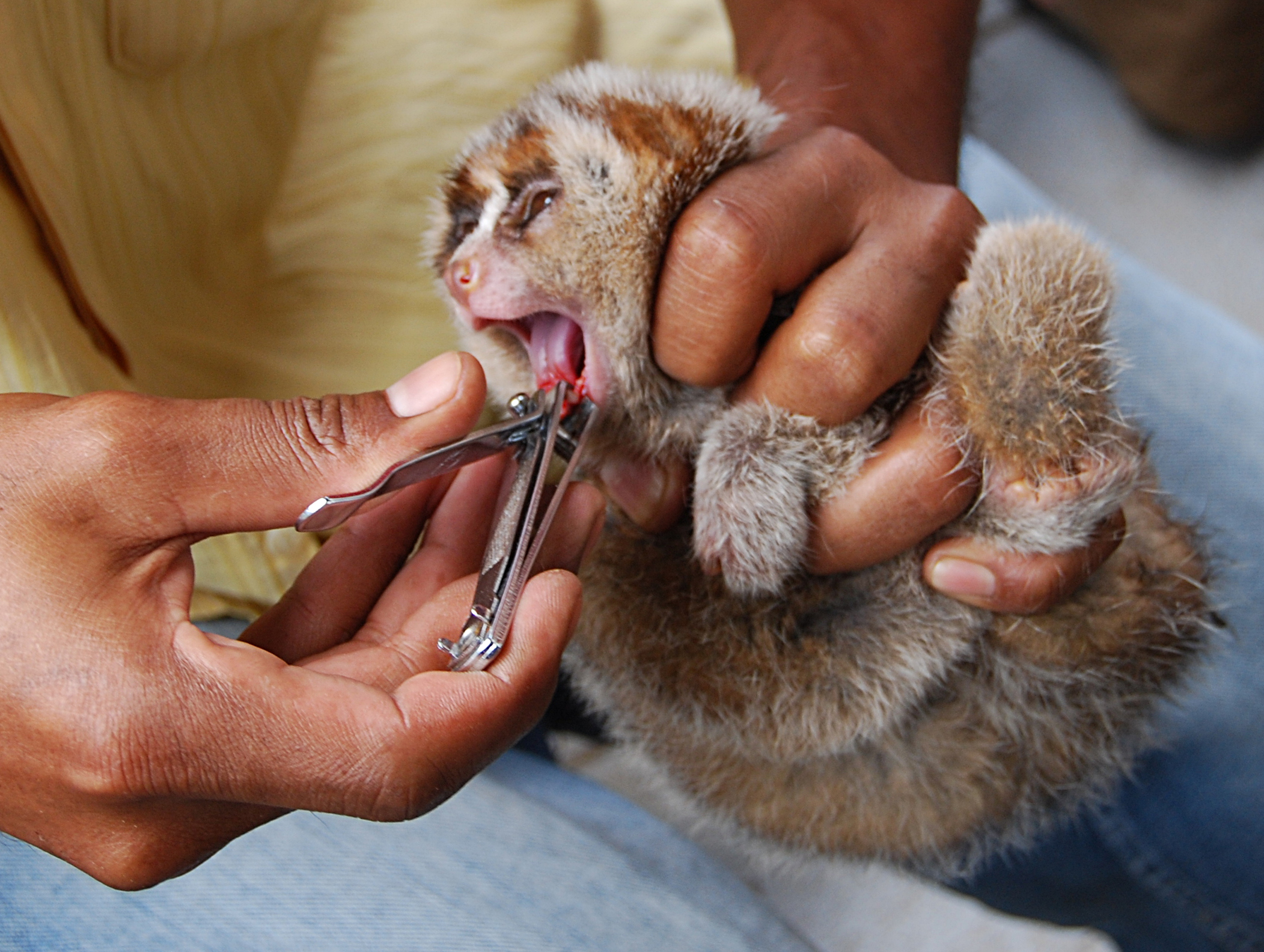
Removing or clipping slow loris teeth can lead to infection and death.

The Sunda slow loris is greatly threatened by the pet trade, and is sold as an exotic pet throughout southeast Asia. The slow lorises are the most commonly traded protected primates in southeast Asia. When sold as a pet it often will have its teeth pulled out to prevent injury to the owner. This may cause dental infections which have up to a 90% death rate. Once it has lost its teeth, reintroduction to the wild is impossible. Due to a very high mortality rate in captivity due to stress, improper nutrition and infection, the pet trade is inflated by replacements. With a greater purchasing power, the increasing human populations in the species' range could have an even more serious impact.

The Sunda slow loris is further threatened by gathering for illegal traditional medicine. The fur is reported to heal wounds, the flesh to cure epilepsy, eyes are used in love potions, and the meat is reported to cure asthma and stomach problems. It is also killed as a crop pest. Severe habitat loss and degradation over large areas of its range have caused large population declines, even though the species is more adaptable to anthropogenic habitats than other primates in the region. The resulting fragmentation has restricted species dispersal as it depends on continuous canopy cover to move from tree to tree.
