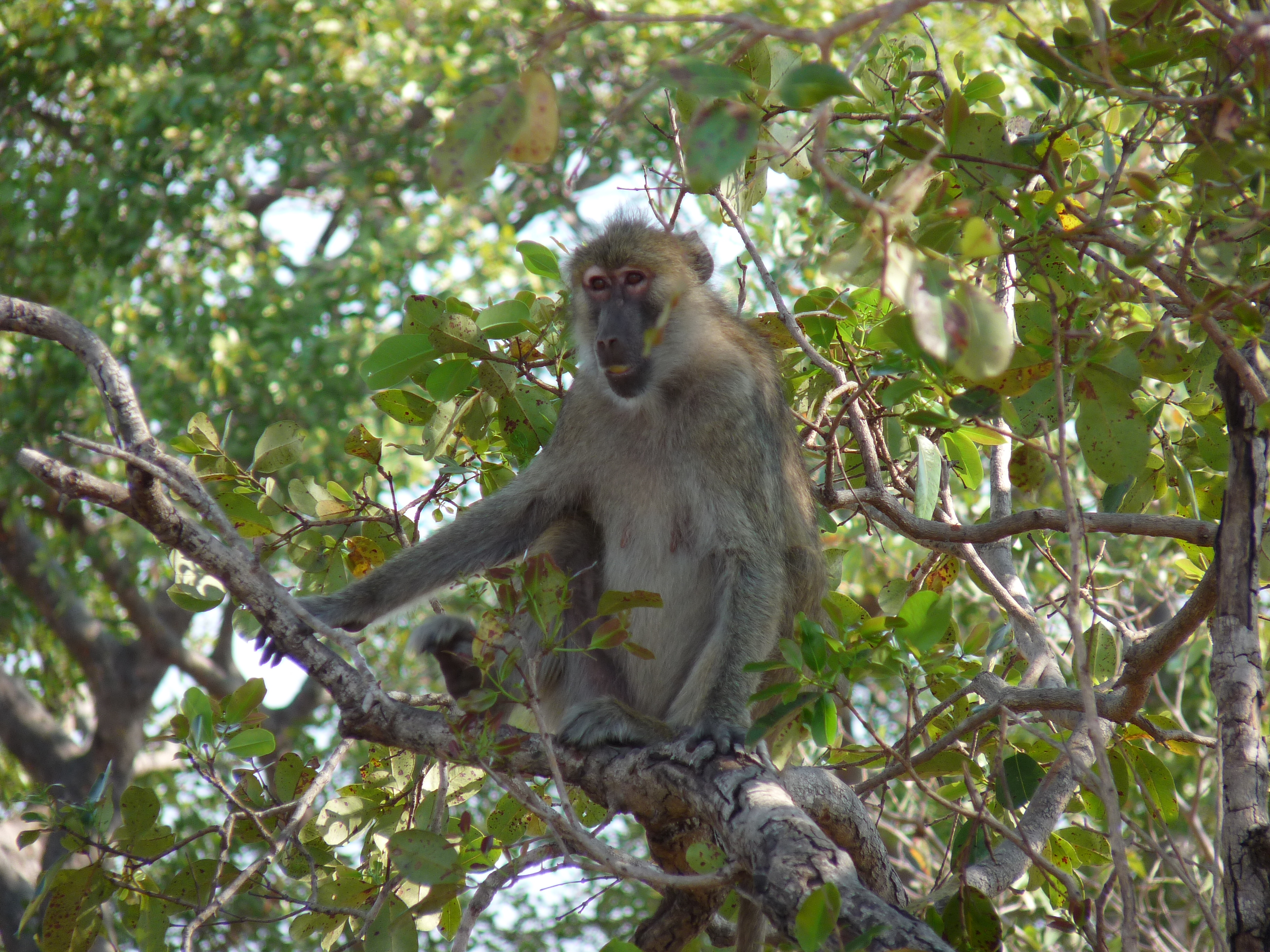

Conservation status
- Least Concern (IUCN 3.1)

Scientific classification
- Kingdom: Animalia
- Phylum: Chordata
- Class: Mammalia
- Infraclass: Placentalia
- Order: Primates
- Family: Cercopithecidae
- Genus: Papio
- Species: P. kindae

Binomial name
- Papio kindae Lönnberg, 1919

= Kinda baboon =

Species of monkey

The Kinda baboon (Papio kindae) is a species of baboon present in the miombo woodlands of Angola, the Democratic Republic of the Congo, Zambia, and possibly western Tanzania. It was once considered a subspecies of the yellow baboon (P. cynocephalus), then distinct enough to merit status as full species (P. kindae) under the phylogenetic species concept.

It is named after the town in southern DRC where the type-locality was found.

== Description ==
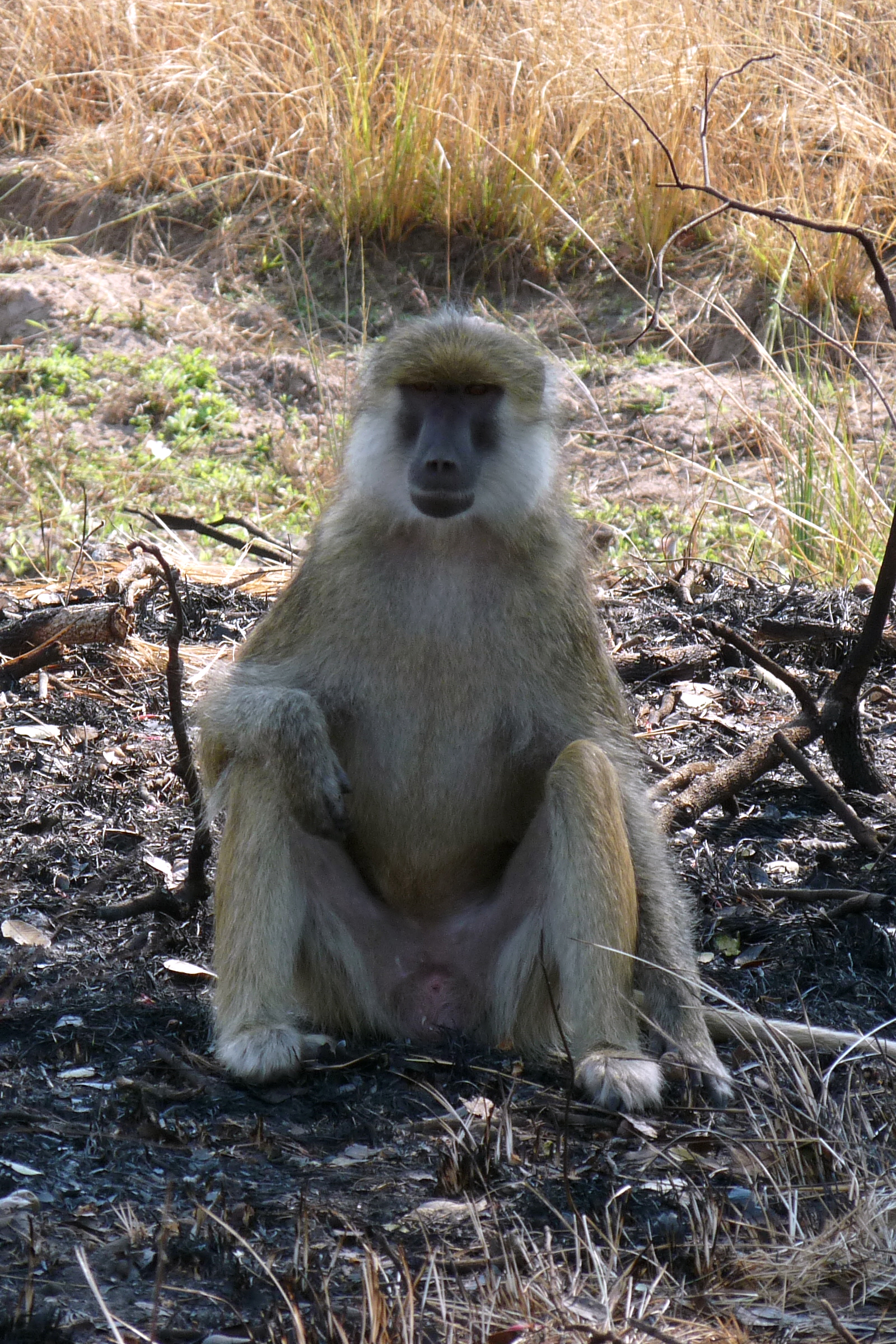
P. kindae in Kafue National Park, Zambia

The Kinda baboon is golden in color with a light build and slender, lanky appearance. Their fur is somewhat longer and is less coarse and much softer compared to other baboon species. It is the smallest of all baboons; adult males are about the size of adult females of other baboon species. The Kinda baboon is also characterized by a shorter snout and pink circles around the eyes. Infants are usually born with white hair rather than black, typical of other baboons. Sexual dimorphism in Kindas is more moderate than in any other baboon species.

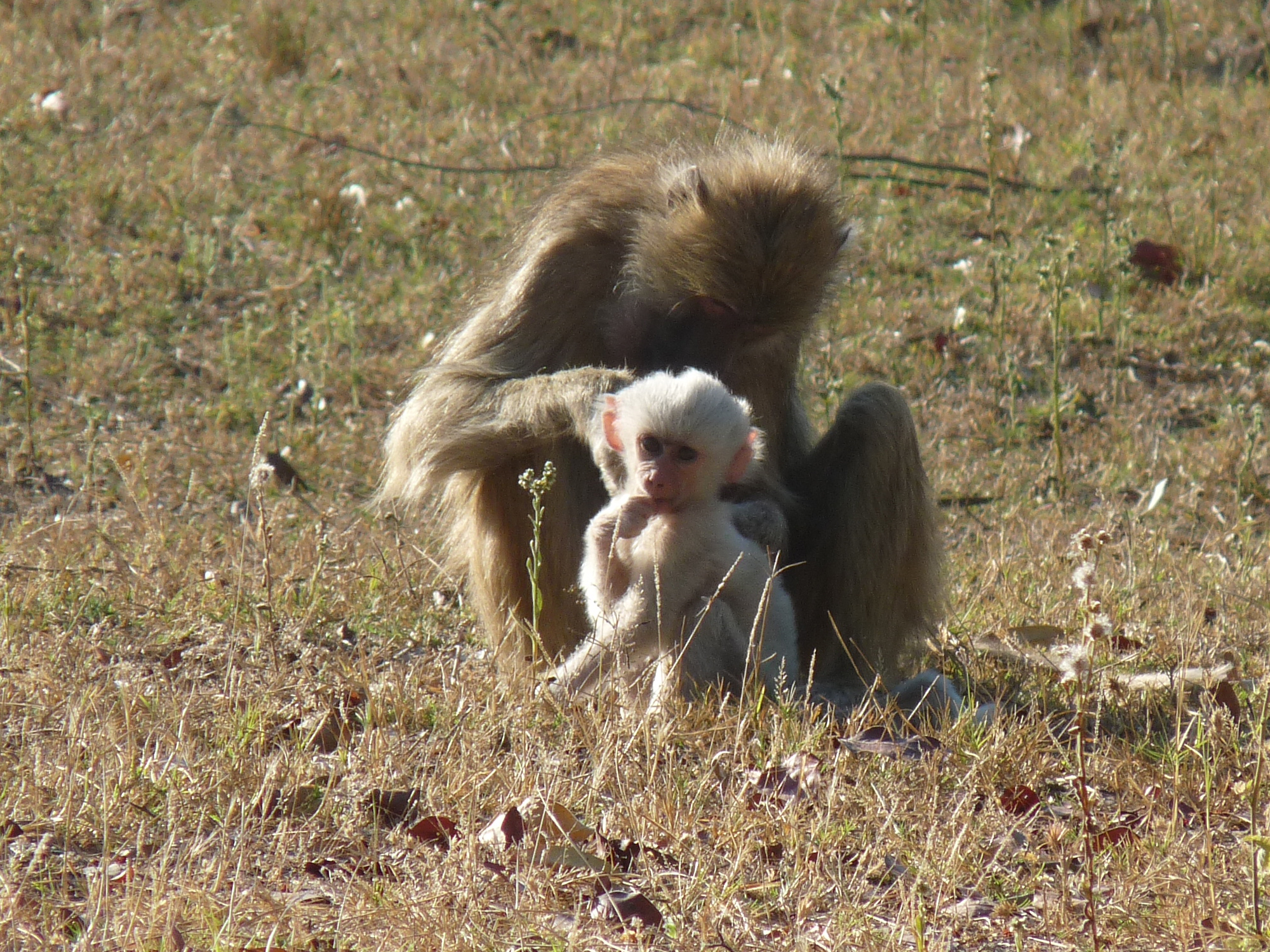
White infant with mother in Kafue National Park, Zambia

=== Hybrid species ===
Baboons in between the size of the Kinda baboon and the yellow baboon are present in northeastern Zambia, and possibly in northern Malawi and southwestern Tanzania as well. Such a broad area of intergradation has been taken as evidence of substantial genetic exchange between the two taxa.

Kinda baboons hybridise with chacma baboons in Kafue National Park in southern Zambia.

== Behaviour ==
The Kinda baboons live in multisexual groups, similar to olive and yellow baboons. These are often much larger, often comprising over 100 baboons. Compared to all other baboon species, Kindas are unusually docile and uniquely characterized by high levels of male investment in male-female social relationships. Strict social hierarchy with female permanent rank obtained from the mother was observed as in other species. Males join new groups and may rise in rank, but violent confrontations are mostly avoided.
