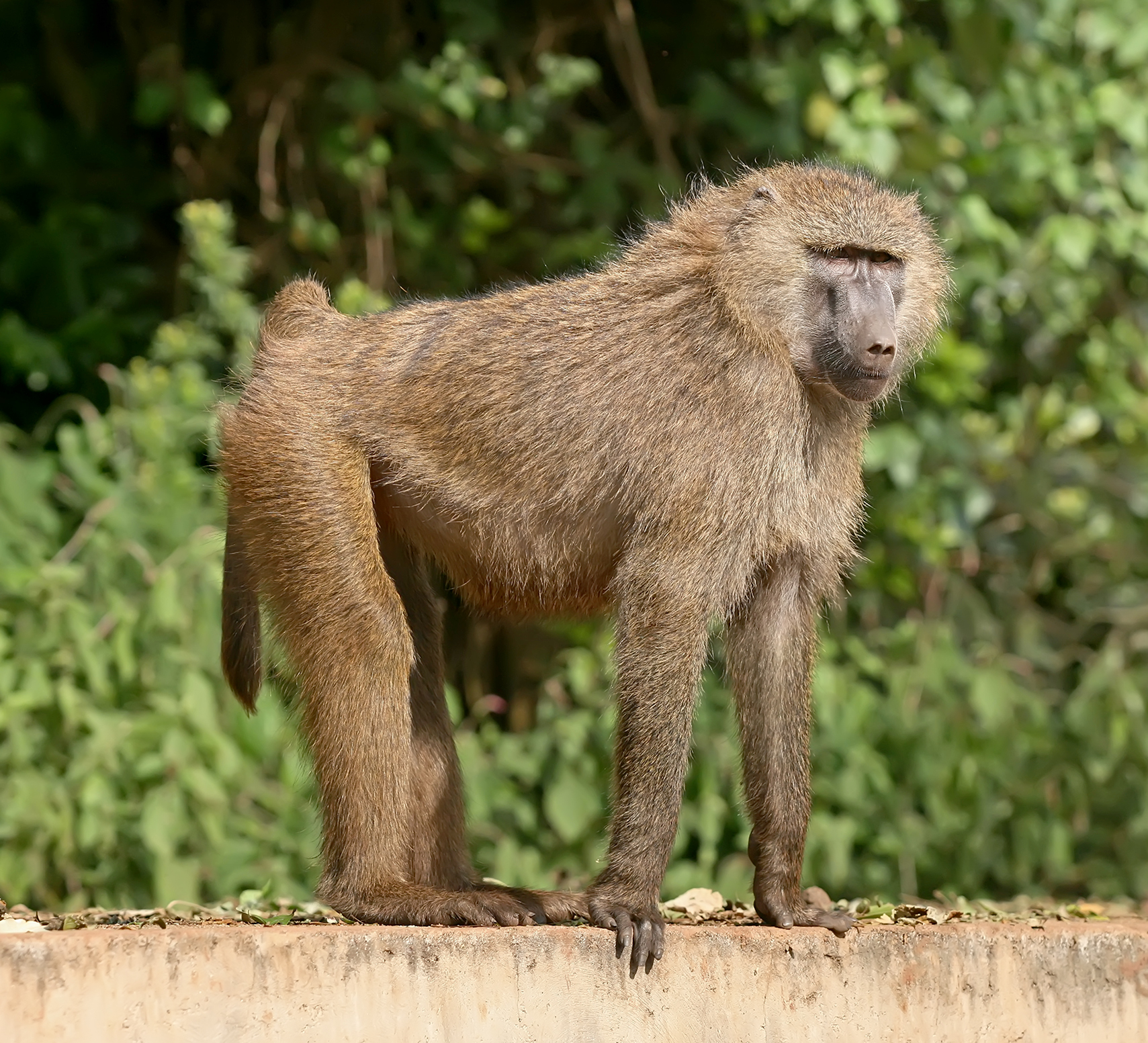
- Olive baboon
- Yellow baboon calls recorded in Kenya

Scientific classification
- Kingdom: Animalia
- Phylum: Chordata
- Class: Mammalia
- Order: Primates
- Family: Cercopithecidae
- Tribe: Papionini
- Genus: Papio; Erxleben, 1777

Type species
- Cynocephalus papio Desmarest, 1820

Species
- Papio hamadryas Papio papio Papio anubis Papio cynocephalus Papio ursinus Papio kindae

Synonyms
- Cynocephalus G. Cuvier and É. Geoffroy, 1795 (non Boddaert, 1768: preoccupied); Chaeropitheus Gervais, 1839; Hamadryas Lesson, 1840 (non Hübner, 1804: preoccupied); Comopithecus J. A. Allen, 1925

= Baboon =

Baboon Temporal range: 2.0–0 Ma Early Pleistocene – Recent

Genus of mammals

Baboons are primates comprising the genus Papio, one of the 23 genera of Old World monkeys, in the family Cercopithecidae. There are six species of baboon: the hamadryas baboon, the Guinea baboon, the olive baboon, the yellow baboon, the Kinda baboon and the chacma baboon. Each species is native to one of six areas of Africa and the hamadryas baboon is also native to part of the Arabian Peninsula. Baboons are among the largest non-hominoid primates and have existed for at least two million years.

Baboons vary in size and weight depending on the species. The smallest, the Kinda baboon, is 50 cm (20 in) in length and weighs only 14 kg (31 lb), while the largest, the chacma baboon, is up to 120 cm (47 in) in length and weighs 40 kg (88 lb). All baboons have long, dog-like muzzles, heavy, powerful jaws with sharp canine teeth, close-set eyes, thick fur except on their muzzles, short tails, and nerveless, hairless pads of skin on their protruding buttocks called ischial callosities that provide for sitting comfort. Male hamadryas baboons have large white manes. Baboons exhibit sexual dimorphism in size, colour, and canine teeth development.

Baboons are diurnal and terrestrial, but sleep in trees, or on high cliffs or rocks at night, away from predators. They are found in open savannas and woodlands across Africa. They are omnivorous and their diet consists of a variety of plants and animals. Their principal predators are Nile crocodiles, leopards, lions and hyenas. Most baboons live in hierarchical troops containing harems. Baboons can determine from vocal exchanges what the dominance relations are between individuals.

In general, each male can mate with any female; the mating order among the males depends partly on their social rank. Females typically give birth after a six-month gestation, usually to one infant. The females tend to be the primary caretaker of the young, although several females may share the duties for all of their offspring. Offspring are weaned after about a year. They reach sexual maturity around five to eight years. Males leave their birth group, usually before they reach sexual maturity, whereas most females stay in the same group for their lives. Baboons in captivity live up to 45 years, while in the wild they average between 20 and 30 years.

== Taxonomy ==
Six species of Papio are recognized, although there is some disagreement about whether they are really full species or subspecies.

Genus Papio – Desmarest, 1820 – six species
Common name	Scientific name and subspecies	Range	Size and ecology	IUCN status and estimated population
Chacma baboon	P. ursinus (Kerr, 1792) Three subspecies: P. u. griseipes (Gray-footed chacma); P. u. ruacana (Ruacana chacma); P. u. ursinus (Cape chacma)	Southern Africa	Size: 50–115 cm (20–45 in) long, plus 45–72 cm (18–28 in) tail Habitat: Forest, savanna, shrubland, grassland, rocky areas, and desert Diet: Fruit, leaves, gum, insects, eggs, seeds, flowers, grass, roots, tubers, and small vertebrates	LC Unknown
Guinea baboon	P. papio (Desmarest, 1820)	Western Africa	Size: 50–115 cm (20–45 in) long, plus 45–72 cm (18–28 in) tail Habitat: Forest, savanna, grassland, and inland wetlands Diet: Roots, tubers, bulbs, corms, small vertebrates, fruit, and seeds	NT Unknown
Hamadryas baboon	P. hamadryas (Linnaeus, 1758)	Horn of Africa and southwestern Arabian Peninsula	Size: 61–77 cm (24–30 in) long, plus 38–61 cm (15–24 in) tail Habitat: Shrubland, grassland, and rocky areas Diet: Fruit, gum, insects, eggs, seeds, flowers, grass, rhizomes, corms, roots, tubers, and small vertebrates	LC Unknown
Kinda baboon	P. kindae Lönnberg, 1919	Central Africa (in green)	Size: 55–84 cm (22–33 in) long, plus 38–66 cm (15–26 in) tail Habitat: Forest, savanna, and shrubland Diet: Omnivorous; primarily fruit	LC Unknown
Olive baboon	P. anubis (Lesson, 1827)	Equatorial Africa	Size: 61–84 cm (24–33 in) long, plus 31–60 cm (12–24 in) tail Habitat: Forest, savanna, shrubland, and grassland Diet: Fruit, gums, insects, eggs, seeds, flowers, grass, rhizomes, corms, roots, tubers, and small vertebrates	LC Unknown
Yellow baboon	P. cynocephalus (Linnaeus, 1766) Two subspecies: P. c. cynocephalus (Common yellow baboon); P. c. ibeanus (Ibean baboon)	Eastern Africa (in red)	Size: 50–115 cm (20–45 in) long, plus 45–72 cm (18–28 in) tail Habitat: Shrubland, savanna, and forest Diet: Grass, sedges, seeds, fruit, roots, leaves, buds, bark, flowers, insects, and small vertebrates	LC Unknown

Previously five species of baboon were recognised; the Kinda baboon has gained support for its species status after phylogenetic studies of all members of Papio. Many authors distinguish P. hamadryas as a full species, but regard all the others as subspecies of P. cynocephalus and refer to them collectively as "savanna baboons". This may not be helpful: it is based on the argument that the hamadryas baboon is behaviorally and physically distinct from other baboon species, and that this reflects a separate evolutionary history. However, recent morphological and genetic studies of Papio show the hamadryas baboon to be more closely related to the northern baboon species (the Guinea and olive baboons) than to the southern species (the yellow and chacma baboons).

=== Fossil record ===
In 2015 researchers found the oldest baboon fossil on record, dated at 2 million years old.

== Characteristics ==
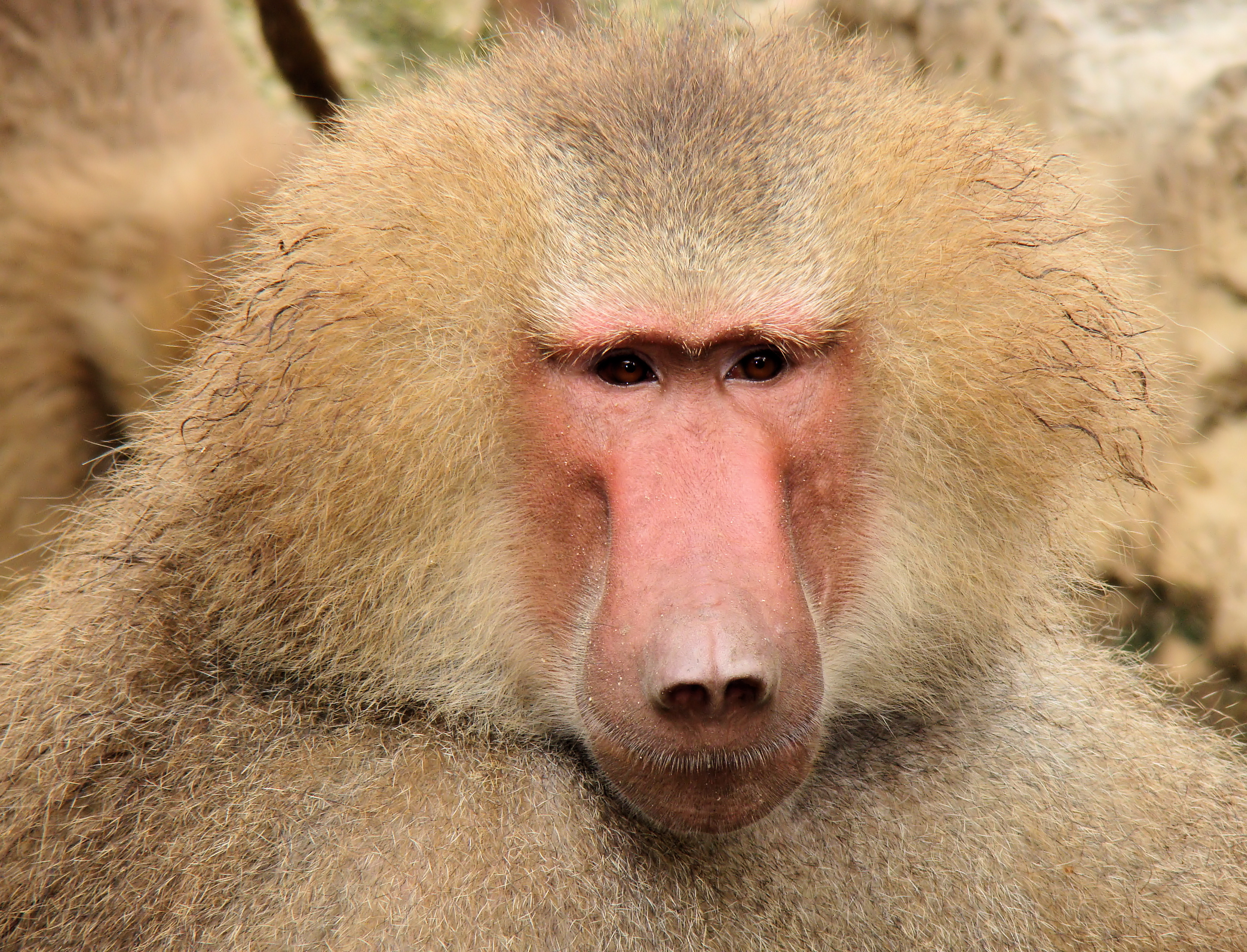
Face of a hamadryas baboon (Papio hamadryas)

All baboons have long, canine-like muzzles, heavy, powerful jaws with sharp canine teeth, close-set eyes, thick fur except on their muzzles, short tails, and rough, hairless pads of skin on their protruding buttocks, called ischial callosities. These calluses are nerveless and provide for the sitting comfort of the baboon.

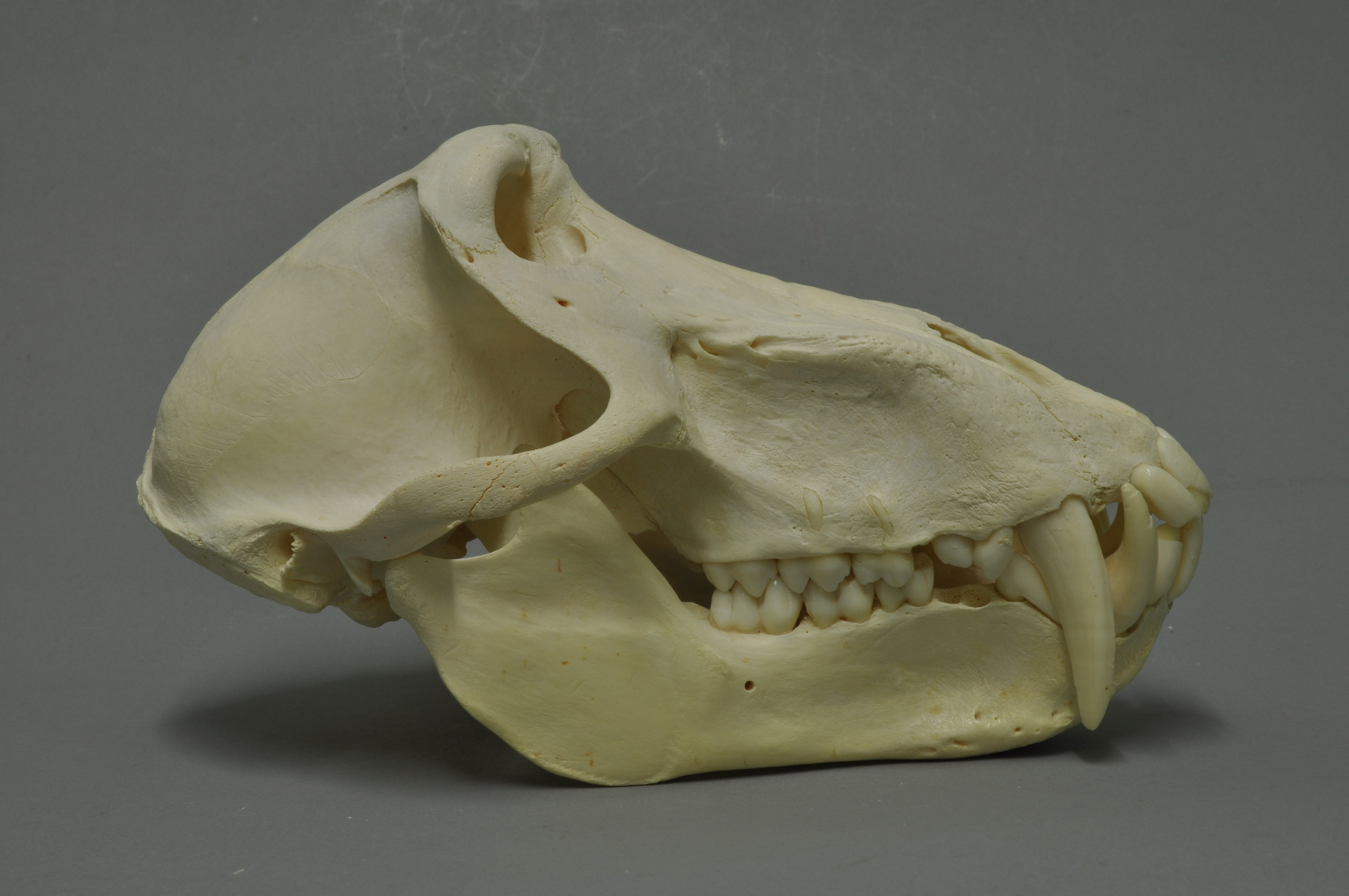
Chacma baboon skull

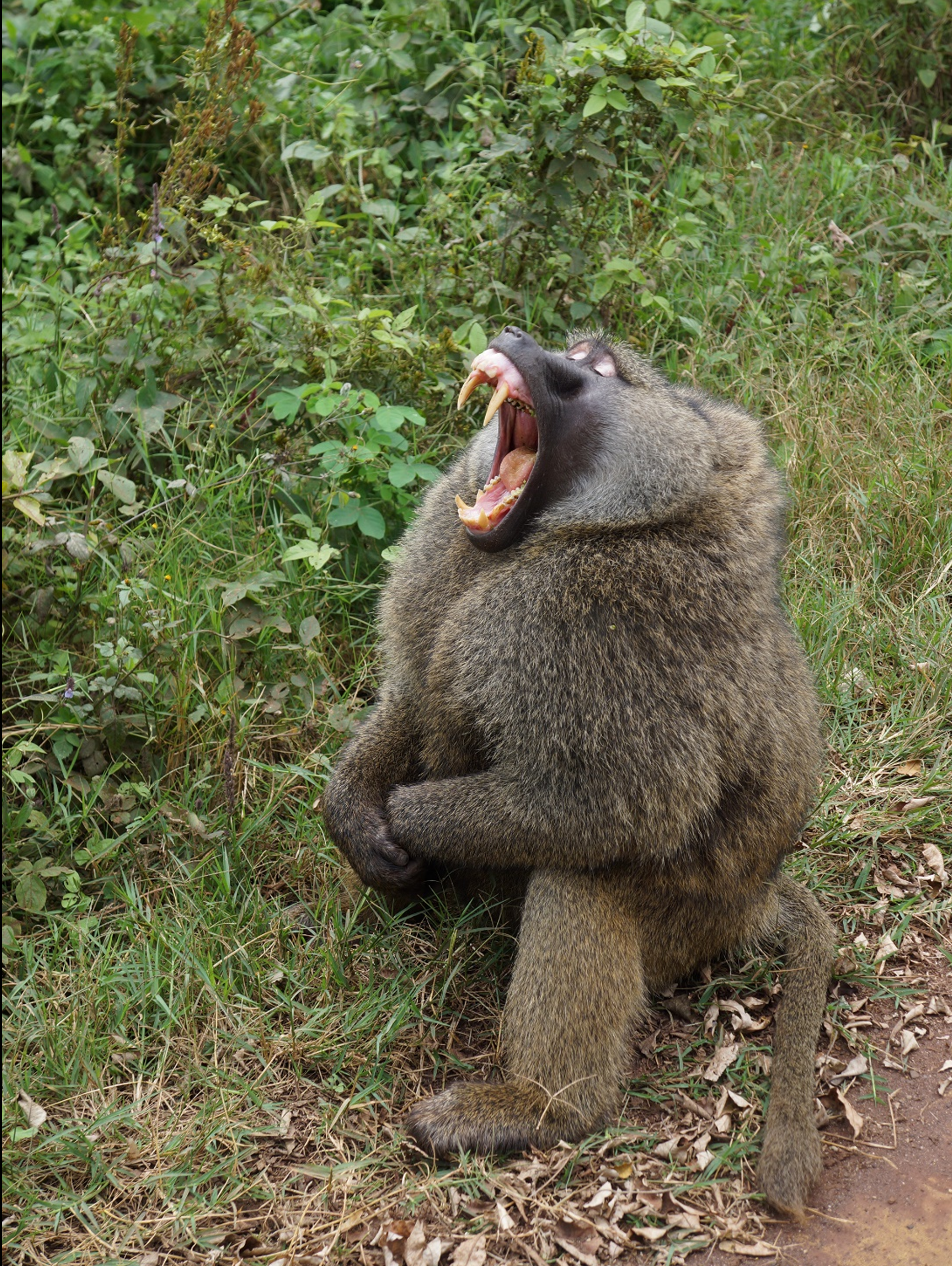
Male olive baboon showing his canines, Ngorongoro National Park, Tanzania, 2014.

All baboon species exhibit pronounced sexual dimorphism, usually in size, but also sometimes in colour. Males have much larger upper canines compared to females and use them to threaten or intimidate other baboons and predators. Males of the hamadryas baboon species also have large white manes.

== Behavior and ecology ==
=== Habitat and prey ===
Baboons are terrestrial (ground dwelling) and are found in open savannah, open woodland and hills across Africa. They are omnivorous, highly opportunistic feeders and will eat virtually anything, including grasses, roots, seeds, leaves, bark, fruits, fungus, insects, spiders, worms, fish, shellfish, rodents, birds, vervet monkeys, and small antelopes. They are foragers and are active at irregular times throughout the day and night. They often raid human dwellings, and in South Africa they break into homes and cars in search of food. Baboons will also raid farms, eating crops and preying on sheep, goats and poultry.

=== Predators ===
Other than humans, the principal predators of baboons are leopards, lions, and spotted and striped hyenas. They are considered a difficult prey for the leopard, though, which is mostly a threat to young baboons. Large males will often confront them by flashing their eyelids, showing their teeth by yawning, making gestures, and chasing after the intruder/predator. Although they are not a prey species, baboons have been killed by the black mamba snake. This usually occurs when a baboon accidentally rouses the snake.

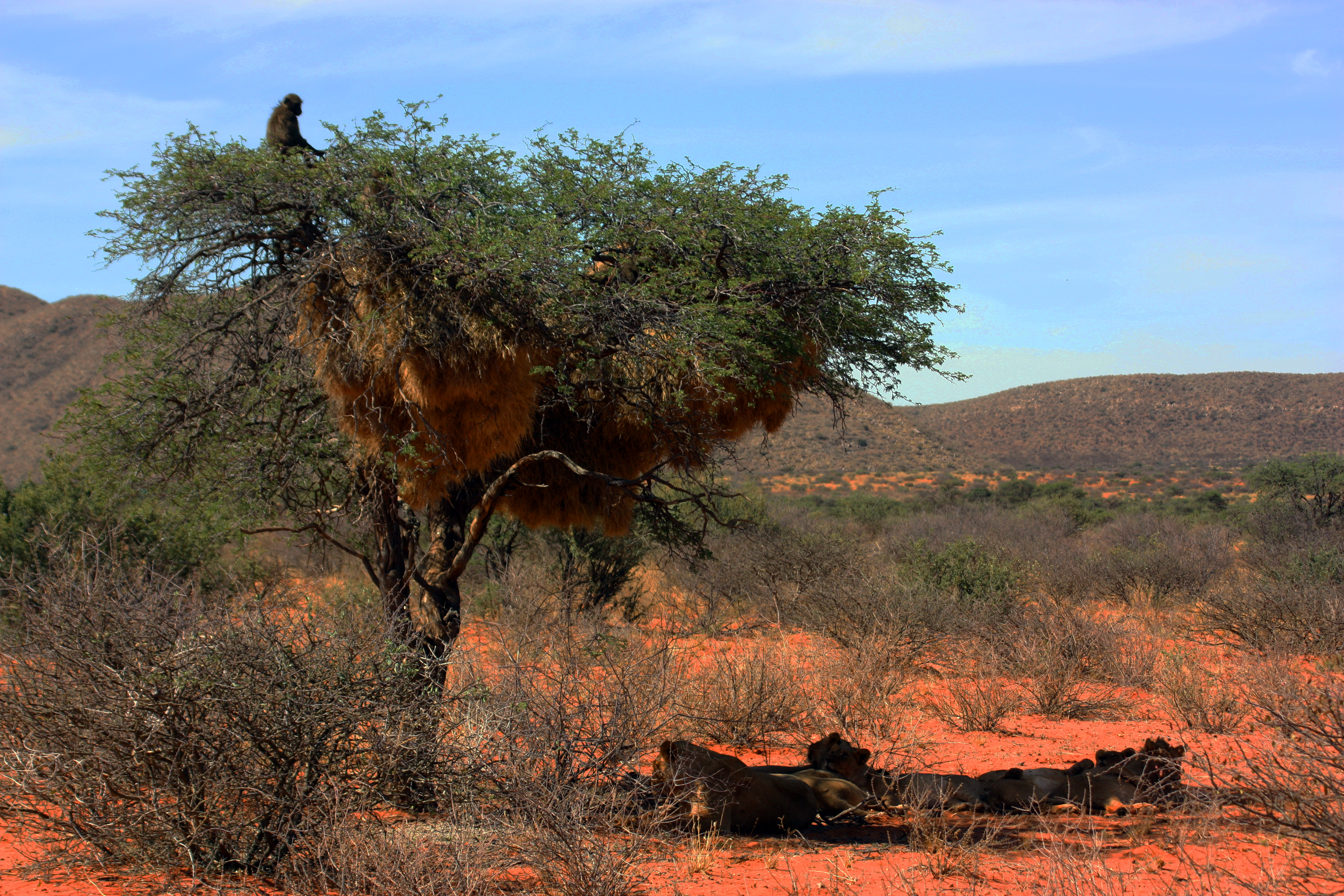
Baboons caught up a tree by Kalahari lions (1 of 3)

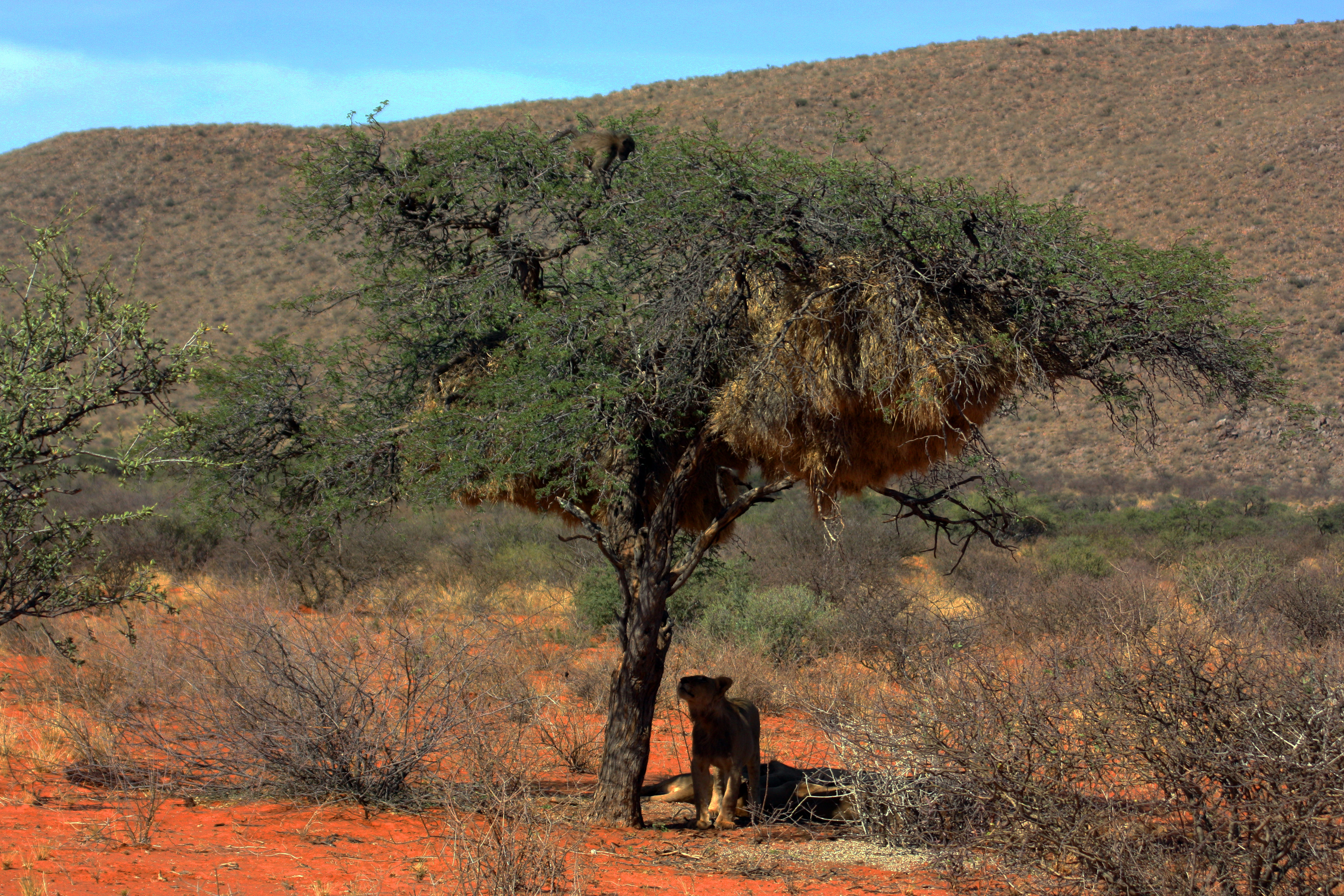
Baboons caught up a tree by Kalahari lions (2 of 3)

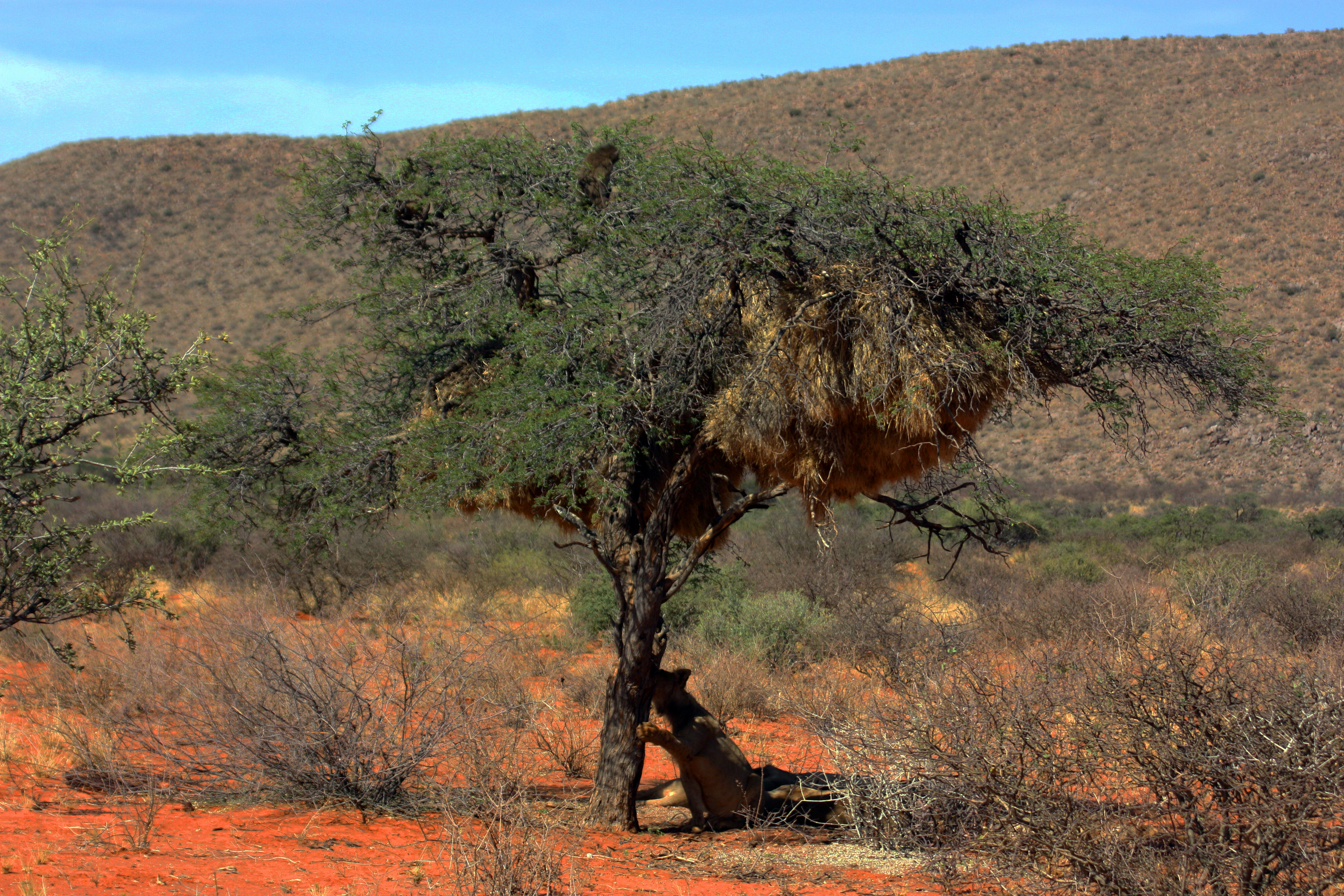
Baboons caught up a tree by Kalahari lions (3 of 3)

=== Social systems ===
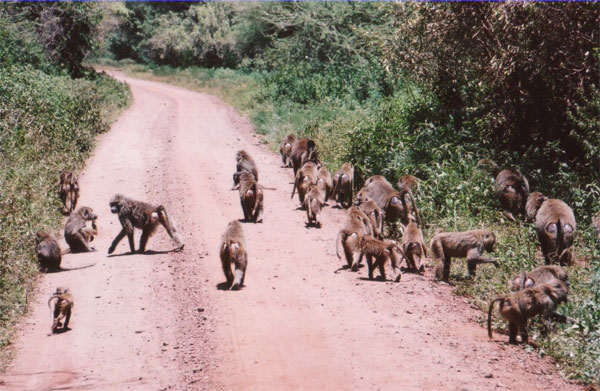
A troop of baboons

The collective noun for baboons is "troop". Most baboons live in hierarchical troops. Group sizes are typically around 50 animals, but can vary between 5 and 250, depending on species, location and time of year. The structure within the troop varies considerably between hamadryas baboons and the remaining species, sometimes collectively referred to as savanna baboons. The hamadryas baboons often appear in very large groups composed of many smaller harems (one male with four or so females), to which females from elsewhere in the troop are recruited while they are still too young to breed. Other baboon species have a more promiscuous structure with a strict dominance hierarchy based on the matriline. The hamadryas baboon group will typically include a younger male, but he will not attempt to mate with the females unless the older male is removed. In the harems of the hamadryas baboons, the males jealously guard their females, to the point of grabbing and biting the females when they wander too far away. Despite this, some males will raid harems for females. Such situations often cause aggressive fights between the males. Visual threats usually accompany these aggressive fights. These include a quick flashing of the eyelids accompanied by a yawn to show off the teeth. Some males succeed in taking a female from another's harem, called a "takeover". In several species, infant baboons are taken by the males as hostages, or used as shields during fights.

Baboons can determine from vocal exchanges what the dominance relations are between individuals. When a confrontation occurs between different families or where a lower-ranking baboon takes the offensive, baboons show more interest in this exchange than those between members of the same family or when a higher-ranking baboon takes the offensive. This is because confrontations between different families or rank challenges can have a wider impact on the whole troop than an internal conflict in a family or a baboon reinforcing its dominance.

Baboon social dynamics can also vary; Robert Sapolsky reported on a troop, known as the Forest Troop, during the 1980s, which experienced significantly less aggressive social dynamics after its most aggressive males died off during a tuberculosis outbreak, leaving a skewed gender ratio of majority females and a minority of low-aggression males. This relatively low-aggression culture persisted into the 1990s and extended to new males coming into the troop, though Sapolsky observed that while unique, the troop was not an "unrecognizably different utopia"; there was still a dominance hierarchy and aggressive intrasexual competition amongst males. Furthermore, no new behaviours were created amongst the baboons, rather the difference was the frequency and context of existing baboon behaviour.

=== Mating ===
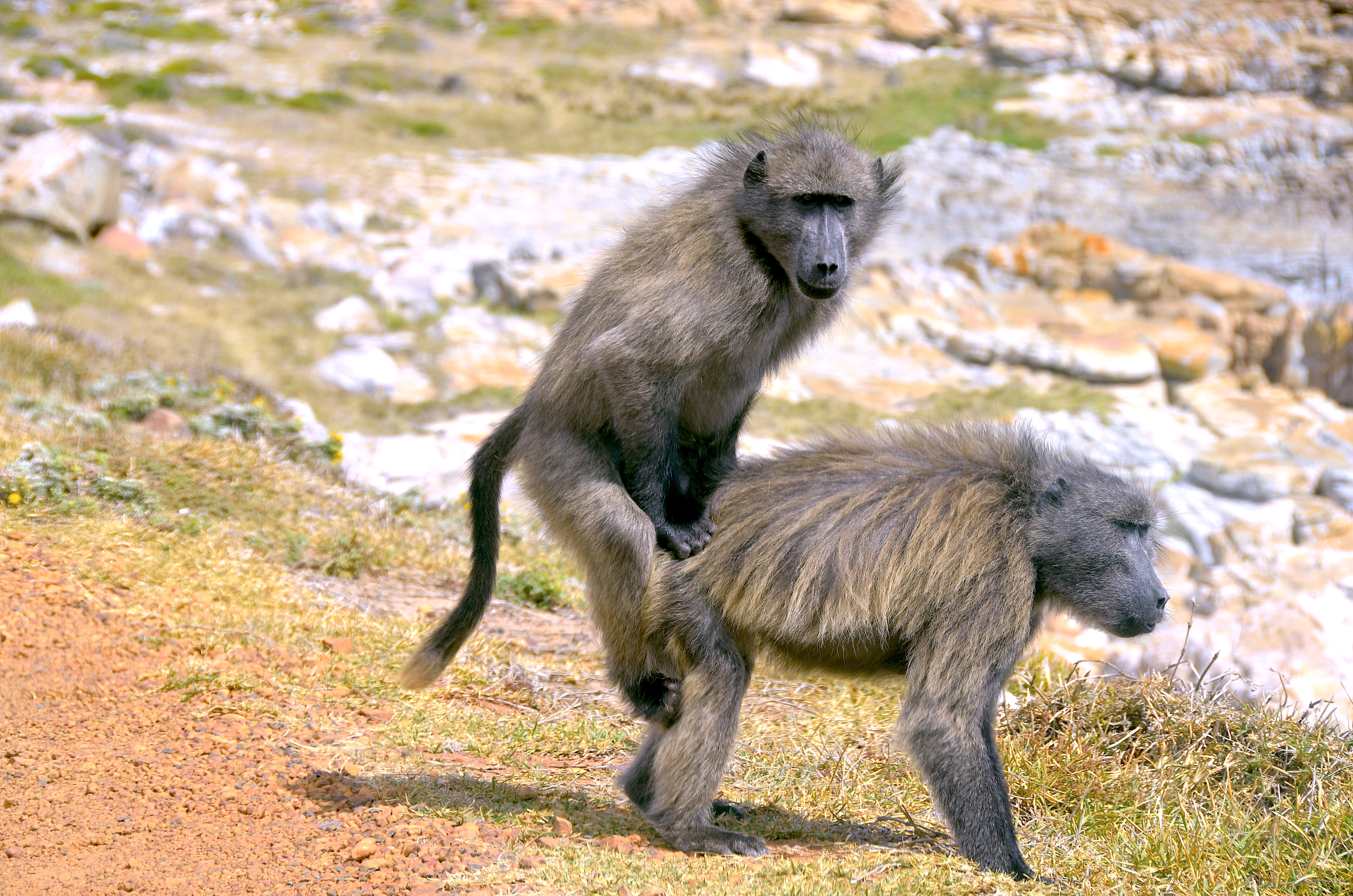
Chacma baboons mating at Cape Point in South Africa

Baboon mating behavior varies greatly depending on the social structure of the troop. In the mixed groups of savanna baboons, each male can mate with any female. The mating order among the males depends partially on their social ranking, and fights between males are not unusual. There are, however, more subtle possibilities; in mixed groups, males sometimes try to win the friendship of females. To garner this friendship, they may help groom the female, help care for her young, or supply her with food. The probability is high that those young are their offspring. Some females clearly prefer such friendly males as mates. However, males will also take infants during fights to protect themselves from harm. A female initiates mating by presenting her swollen rump to the male's face.

In a wild baboon population of the Amboseli ecosystem in Kenya, inbreeding is avoided by mate choice. Inbreeding avoidance through mate choice is thought to only evolve when related possible sexual partners frequently encounter each other and there is a risk of inbreeding depression.

=== Birth, rearing young, and life expectancy ===
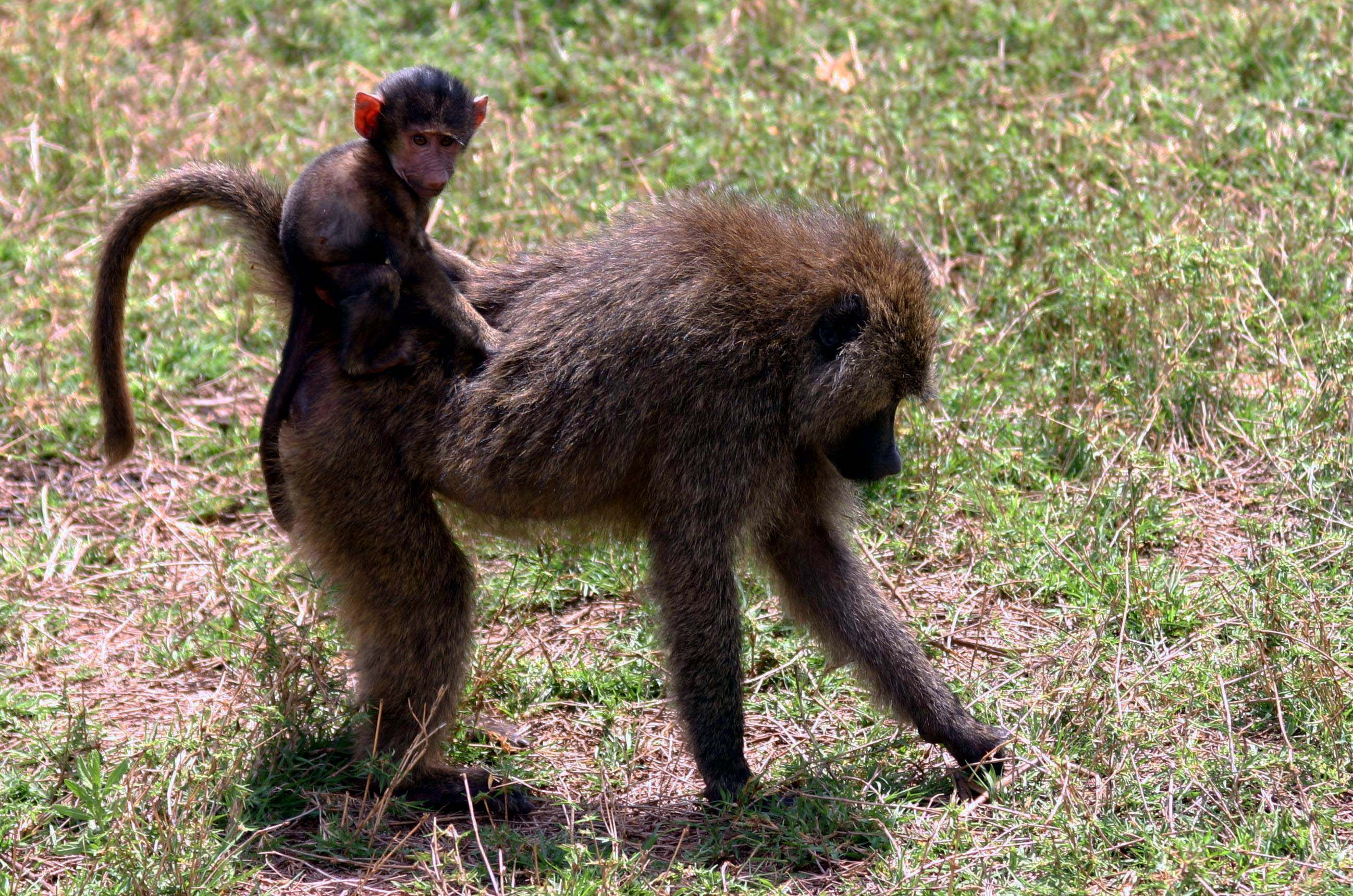
Young olive baboon on the back of its mother, Lake Manyara National Park, Tanzania

Females typically give birth after a six-month gestation, usually to a single infant; twin baboons are rare and usually do not survive. The young baboon weighs approximately 400 g and has a black epidermis when born.

The females tend to be the primary caretaker of the young, although several females will share the duties for all of their offspring. After about one year, the young animals are weaned. They reach sexual maturity in five to eight years. Baboon males leave their birth group, usually before they reach sexual maturity, whereas females are philopatric and stay in the same group their whole lives.

Baboons in captivity have been known to live up to 45 years, while in the wild their life expectancy is between 20 and 30 years.

== Relationship with humans ==
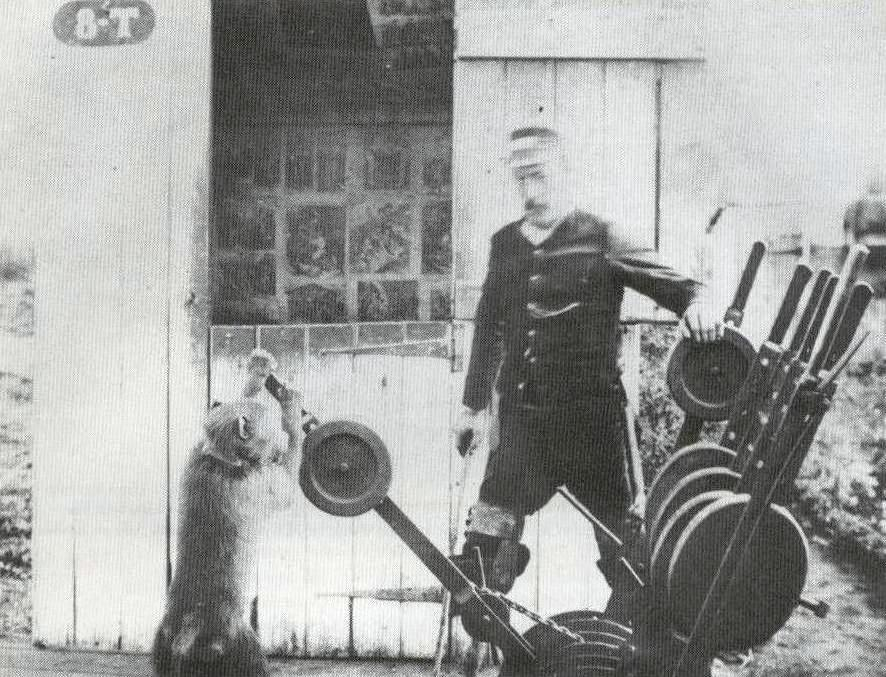
Jack, a trained baboon, operating a railway junction for a disabled signalman in Uitenhage, 1884

In Egyptian mythology, Babi was the deification of the hamadryas baboon and was therefore a sacred animal. It was known as the attendant of Thoth, hence also being known as the sacred baboon.

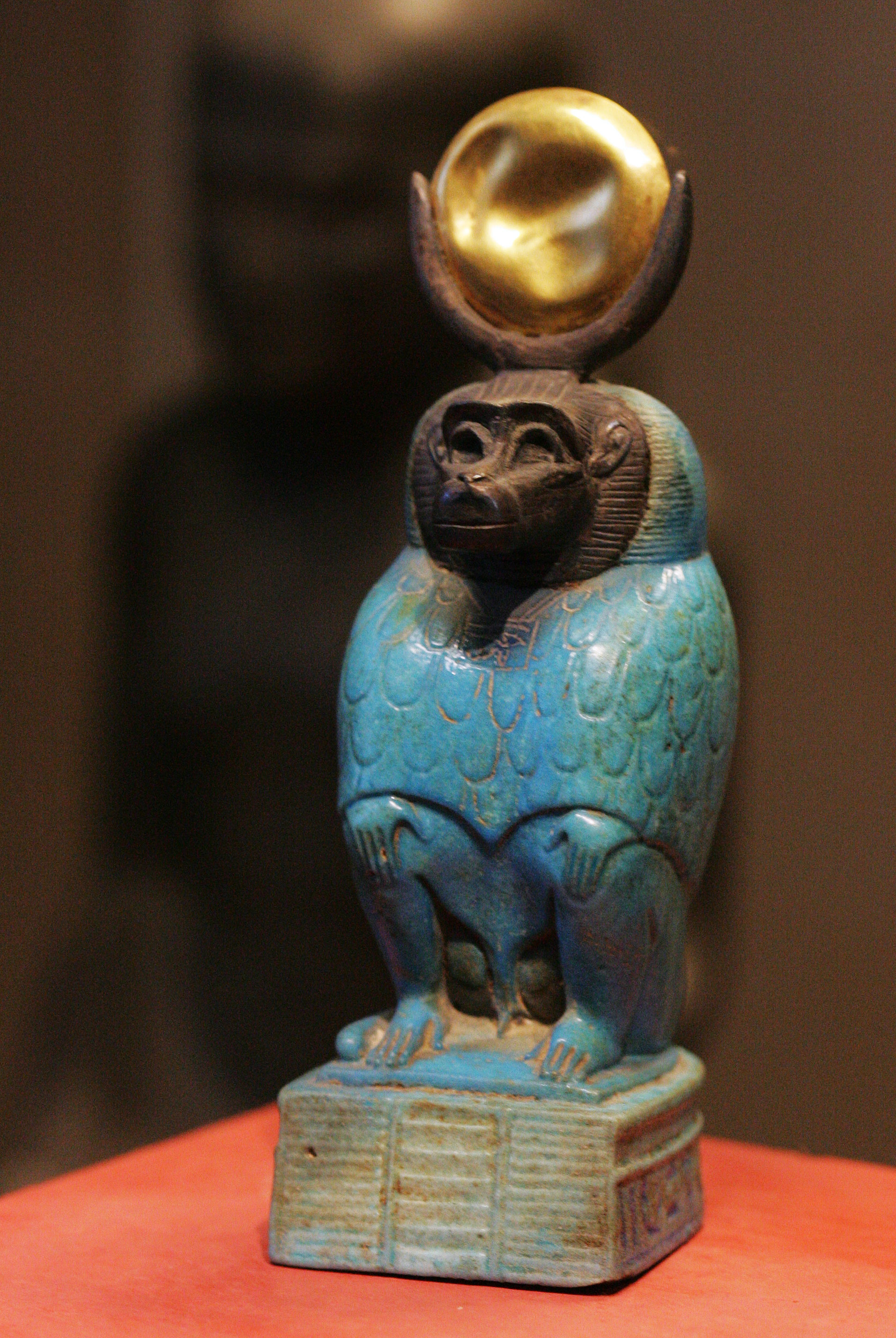
Faience statue of Thoth as baboon depicted with the moon-disk on his head.

The 2009 documentary Baboon Woman examines the relationship between baboons and humans in South Africa. Baboons are often feared by local people due to their aggressive nature. In South Africa, many have associated baboons with the occult and bad luck. Baboons have often been blamed for attacking humans, even though humans are more likely to attack them or invade their territory. Farmers in Wollo Province, Ethiopia, have reported conflict with olive baboons in grazing lands.

== Diseases ==
Some strains of the Herpesvirus papio family of viruses infect baboons. Their effects on humans are unknown. Humans infected with Mycobacterium tuberculosis can transmit the disease to the primates upon close proximity. Pathogens have a high likelihood of spreading through humans and species of nonhuman primates, such as baboons.

== See also ==
- Amboseli Baboon Research Project
- List of historical monkeys
- Parapapio

== Sources ==
- Kingdon, Jonathan (2014). Mammals of Africa. Vol. II: Primates. A & C Black. ISBN 978-1-4081-8991-7.
- Kingdon, Jonathan (2015). The Kingdon Field Guide to African Mammals (Second ed.). Bloomsbury Publishing. ISBN 978-1-4729-2531-2.
