= Jack (baboon) =

Chacma baboon and mobility aid (died 1890)

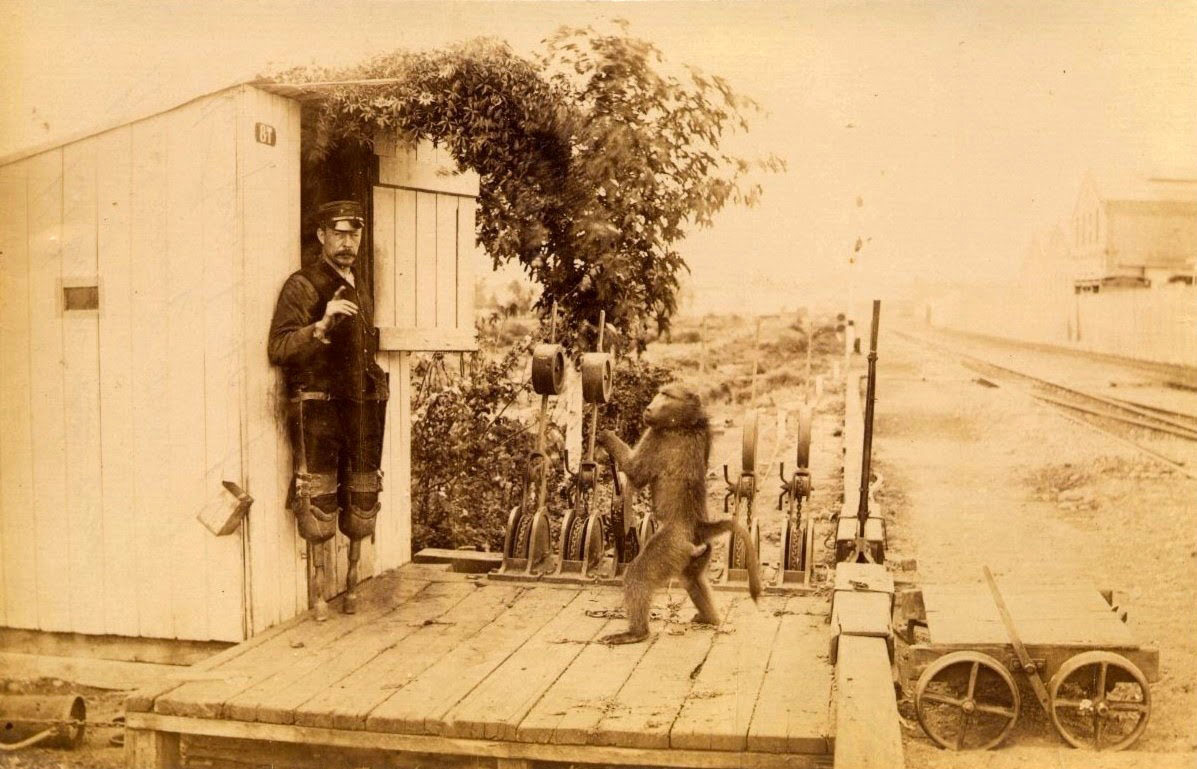
- James Wide (left) with Jack
- Species: Chacma baboon
- Sex: Male
- Died: 1890; Uitenhage, Cape Colony
- Cause of death: Tuberculosis
- Resting place: Albany Museum
- Occupation: Assistant to a disabled railway signalman
- Notable role: Railway signaller
- Years active: 9
- Owner: James Wide

Jack (died 1890) was a chacma baboon who assisted a disabled railway signalman, James Wide, in South Africa.

== Biography ==
Jack worked with double-leg amputee James Edwin Wide, who worked as a signalman for the Cape Town–Port Elizabeth Railway service. James "Jumper" Wide had been known for jumping between railcars until an accident where he fell and lost both of his legs below the knee.

Wide first encountered Jack at the Uitenhage market in 1881, where the young monkey was helping a merchant by leading an oxcart. Struggling to maintain employment, Wide approached the merchant and convinced him to sell Jack, who was about 2 years old. Wide then trained Jack to push his wheelchair and to operate the railways signals under supervision.

Jack was approximately 4 feet and 6 inches tall when standing on his hind legs. He was strong enough to pull even the heaviest ("distant") signal. He also proved capable of understanding Wide's needs by observation, leading him to help in unexpected ways. For instance, Wide needed to routinely bring engine-drivers a padlock key when they needed to refuel. After watching Wide struggle in walking back and forth to deliver the key, Jack suddenly started picking it up himself, giving it to the drivers when needed, and returning it to its nail.

Shortly after starting work at the trailway, a rider complained that a baboon was changing railway signals at Uitenhage near Port Elizabeth, and officials launched an investigation. After testing the baboon's skills, the railway decided to employ him, and his position became official. Jack was paid twenty cents a day, and half a bottle of beer each week. It is widely reported that in his nine years of employment with the railway company, he never made a single mistake.

Jack died of tuberculosis in 1890. His skull is in the collection of the Albany Museum in Grahamstown.

According to a letter published in Nature,

Jack acted as a railwayman at Uitenhage in the Cape... The story was originally documented by the Rev. George Howe in 1890, and later by F. W. Fitzsimons, director of the Port Elizabeth Museum. Fitzsimons' account... is published in the Cape Mercury of 29 May 1923. It relies on an interview with Wide, the written statements of 25 witnesses, filed in the museum collection, and on Howe's evidence.

== Popular culture ==
Railway Jack: The True Story of an Amazing Baboon, written by KT Johnson and illustrated by César Samaniego, is a children's book published by Captone in 2019. It is based on extensive research by the author, including documentation provided by descendants of George B. Howe.

Jack was mentioned on the second series of XFM Radio's The Ricky Gervais Show by producer Karl Pilkington as part of his regular feature, "Monkey News". His recounting of the story was broadly accurate, but co-hosts Ricky Gervais and Stephen Merchant quickly disregarded the account.

== See also ==
- List of individual monkeys

== Sources ==
- Cheney, Dorothy L.; Seyfarth, Robert M. (2008). Baboon Metaphysics: The Evolution of a Social Mind. University of Chicago Press. ISBN 978-0226102443.
- Conway Morris, Simon (2003). Life's Solution: Inevitable Humans in a Lonely Universe. Cambridge University Press. p. 242. ISBN 9781139440806.
- Nisbet, E. G. (October 1990). "Jack of all trades". Nature. 347 (6295): 704. Bibcode:1990Natur.347..704N. doi:10.1038/347704a0.
- Wallechinsky, David (1975). The People's Almanac. Doubleday. p. 697. ISBN 9780385040600.
