= Baboon Woman =

2009 British wildlife documentary film

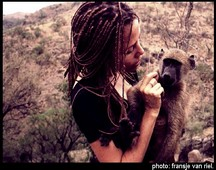
- Starring: Karin Saks
- Country of origin: United Kingdom
- No. of episodes: 1

Production
- Running time: 60 minutes (including commercials)

Original release
- Network: Five
- Release: April 21, 2009 – present

Baboon Woman is a wildlife documentary starring Karin Saks.

== Background ==
In South Africa, baboons have historically been treated as pests and are persecuted. As human development continues to encroach on natural habitats, the war between humans and non-human primates in South Africa, is increasing. Non-lethal methods to manage perceived "problem" non-human primates are encouraged by a number of baboon experts in South Africa.

== Premise ==
When Karin receives an ill baby baboon named Kajika to foster, his potential future to be returned into the wild is followed, resulting in him interacting with two wild troops. One of these troops naturally starts to accept him when he begins to interact with individuals who visit the land where Karin, her partner and a number of rescued non-human primates reside.

The documentary focuses on Karin's work with baboons; she observes their behaviour, fosters their young, and has a passion about them.

It includes an interview with a woman of San descent who describes a time when the San lived in harmony with baboons, shared their food and learnt about medicinal herbs from them, illustrating a potential for harmonious co-existence that has been replaced with a modern-day culture that attempts to eliminate any species that threatens the economic interests of modern society. An interview with Karin's colleague Gareth Patterson who is best known for his work with lions, echoes the theme of conflict between the environment and human development, supporting Saks' work which Patterson describes as "pioneering".

In the documentary she describes how interacting closely with baboons has revealed a lost part of the self; this is illustrated in a diary excerpt written when she first interacted with a wild troop of baboons while releasing a foster baby orphan;

"My mind’s forest had formed new paths, heading towards a profound new worldview. Near a small town called Naboomspruit in 1998 where I’d been introducing my foster baboon infant – Gismo – to a troop of 17 chacma baboons on a private reserve named Mosdene, something internal had stirred and woken up. Admittedly, it was a personal journey. One that life had blessed me in particular with, but it spoke of much more, offering a unique glimpse into our place within the rest of nature. More importantly, it revealed what we’d lost and how to retrieve it."

— Karin Saks
