= The Cape Mercury =

The Cape Mercury was a newspaper that operated from King Williams Town in the Cape Colony, from 1875 to 1947.

It was founded by the brothers William and George Hay, during a time of great economic and social expansion at the Cape. The paper was edited by William Hay from its founding in 1875, until 1885, and was at the time the only English daily newspaper published from that town. It was also contracted by John Tengo Jabavu to publish his Xhosa newspaper, Imvo.
