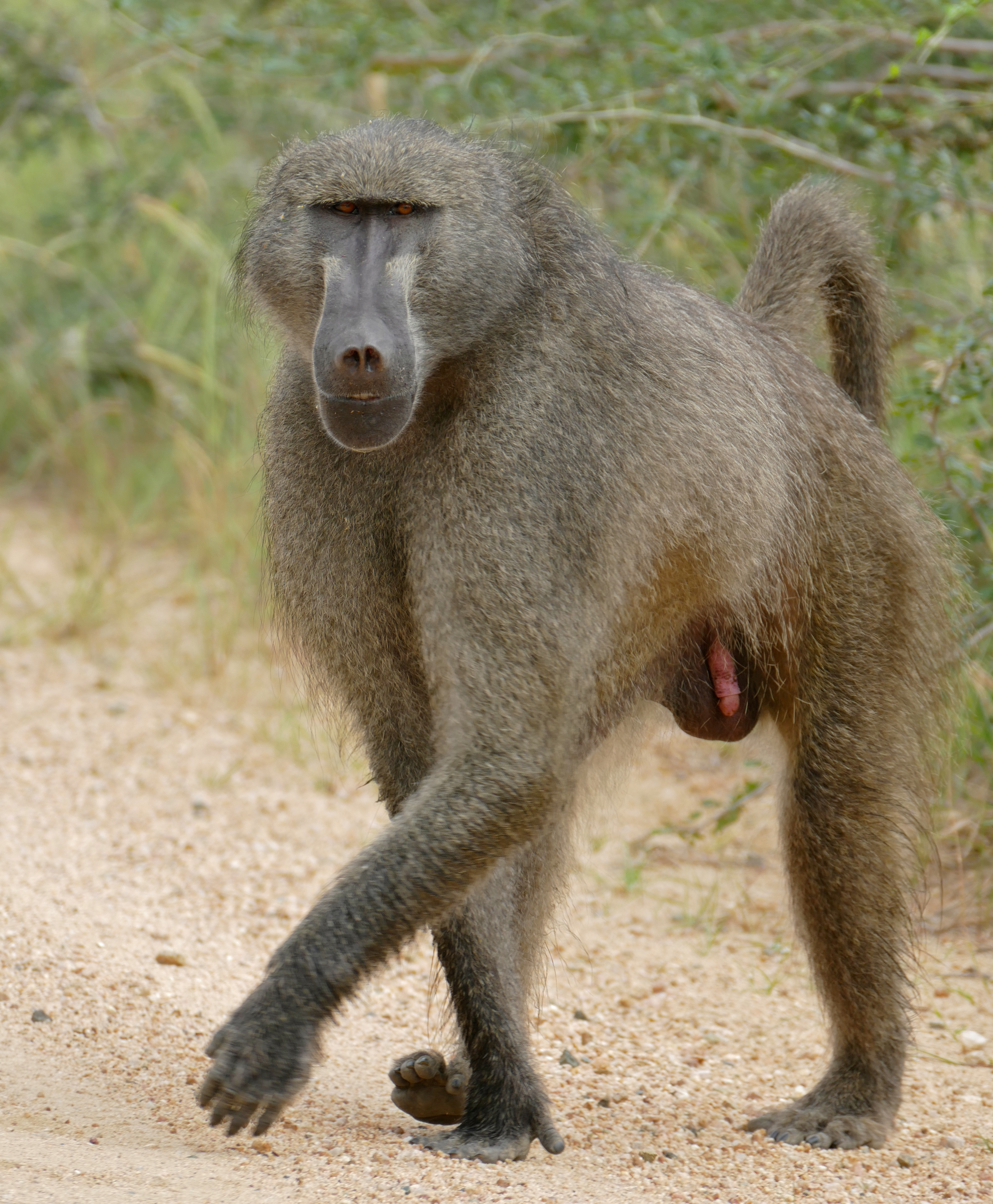
- Chacma baboon male on the S140 road east of Orpen, Kruger National Park, South Africa

Conservation status
- Least Concern (IUCN 3.1)

Scientific classification
- Kingdom: Animalia
- Phylum: Chordata
- Class: Mammalia
- Order: Primates
- Family: Cercopithecidae
- Genus: Papio
- Species: P. ursinus

Binomial name
- Papio ursinus (Kerr, 1792)

Subspecies
- 3 subspecies, see text
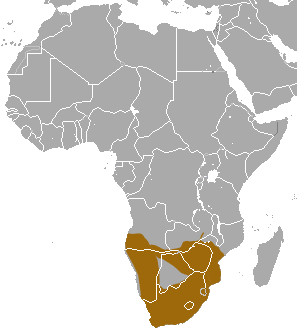
- Geographic range

Audio
- Calls

= Chacma baboon =

Species of Old World monkey

The chacma baboon (Papio ursinus), also known as the Cape baboon, is, like all other baboons, from the Old World monkey family. It is one of the largest of all monkeys. Located primarily in southern Africa, the chacma baboon has a wide variety of social behaviours, including a dominance hierarchy, collective foraging, adoption of young by females, and friendship pairings. These behaviors form parts of a complex evolutionary ecology. In general, the species is not threatened, but human population pressure has increased contact between humans and baboons. Hunting, trapping, and accidents kill or remove many baboons from the wild, thereby reducing baboon numbers and disrupting their social structure.

== Taxonomy ==
Due to hybridization between different baboon (Papio) populations across Africa, authors have occasionally grouped the entire radiation as a single species, the hamadryas baboon, Papio hamadryas. Arbitrary boundaries were then used to separate the populations into subspecies. Other authors once considered the chacma baboon a subspecies of the yellow baboon, Papio cynocephalus, although it is now recognised as a separate species, Papio ursinus. The chacma baboon has two or three subspecies, depending on which classification is followed. Grubb et al. (2003) lists two subspecies, while Groves (2005) in Mammal Species of the World listed three. This article follows Groves (2005) and describes three distinct subspecies. In the Grubb et al. (2003) paper, P. u. raucana was believed to be synonymous with P. u. ursinus.

- Papio ursinus ursinus Kerr, 1792 – Cape chacma (found in southern South Africa)
- P. ursinus griseipes Pocock, 1911 – Gray-footed chacma (found in northern South Africa to southern Zambia)
- P. ursinus raucana Shortridge, 1942 – Ruacana chacma (found from Namibia to southern Angola, but not accepted by all authorities as distinct.
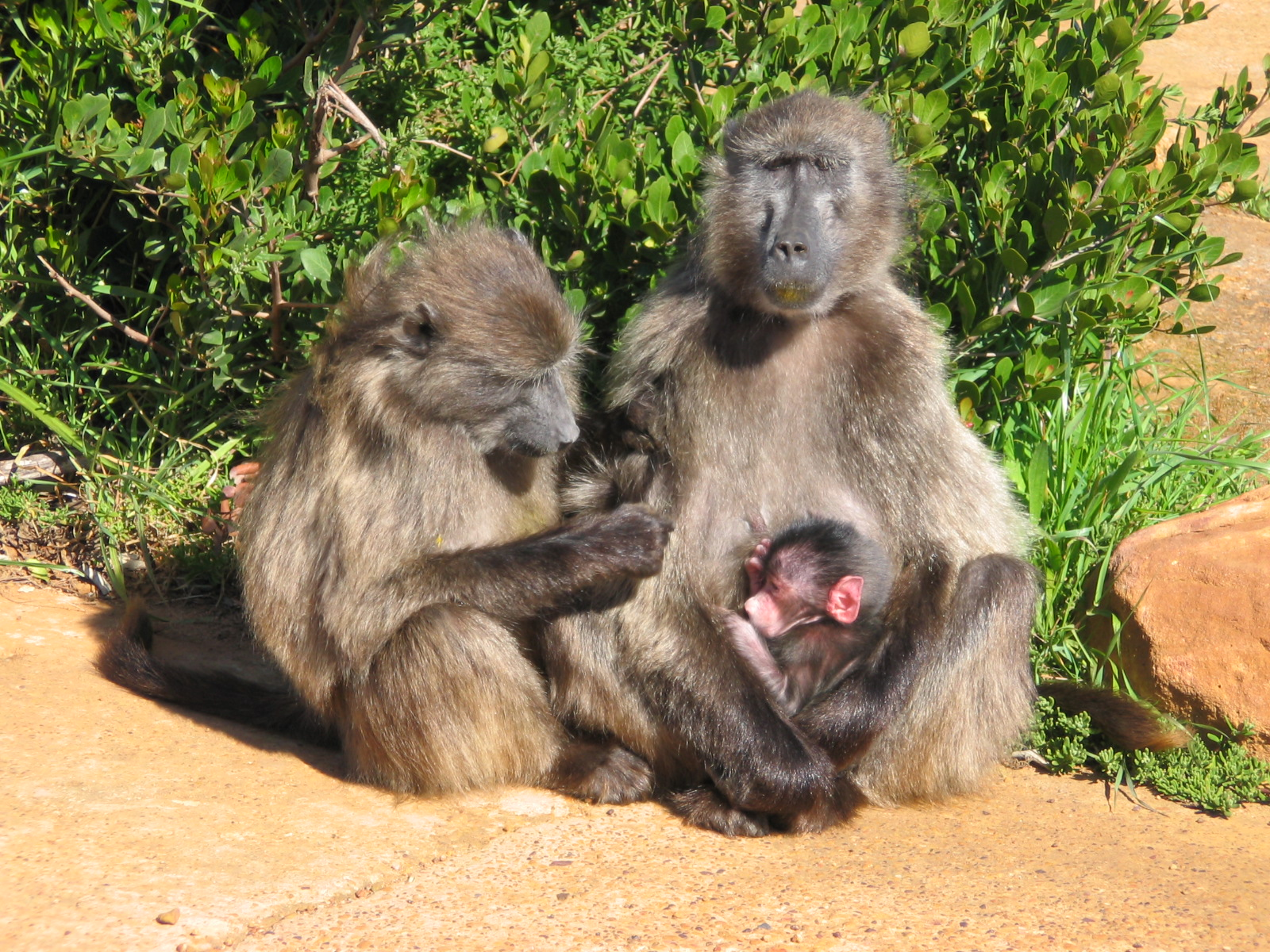
P. u. ursinus
Cape of Good Hope, South Africa

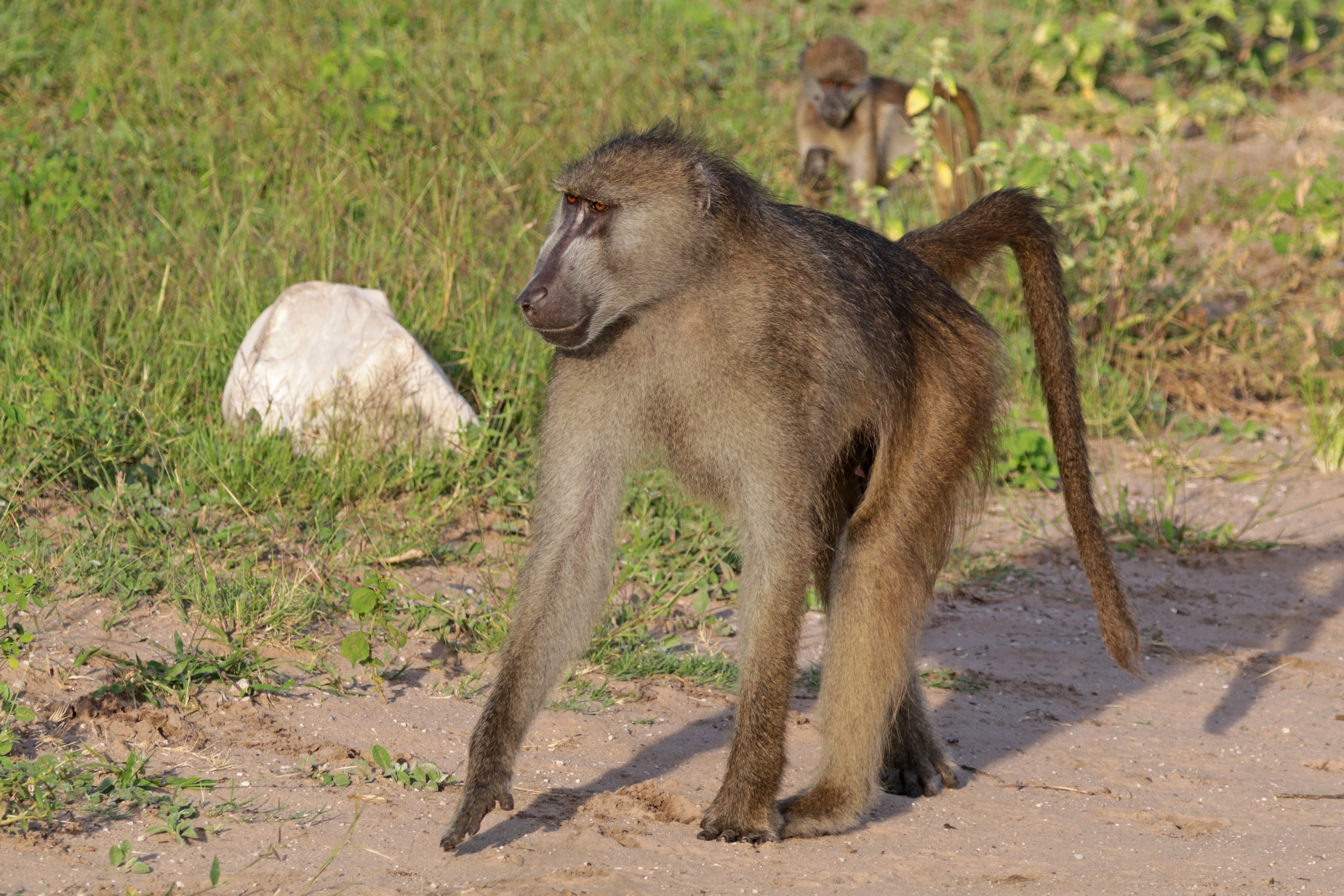
Male P. u. griseipes
Chobe National Park, Botswana

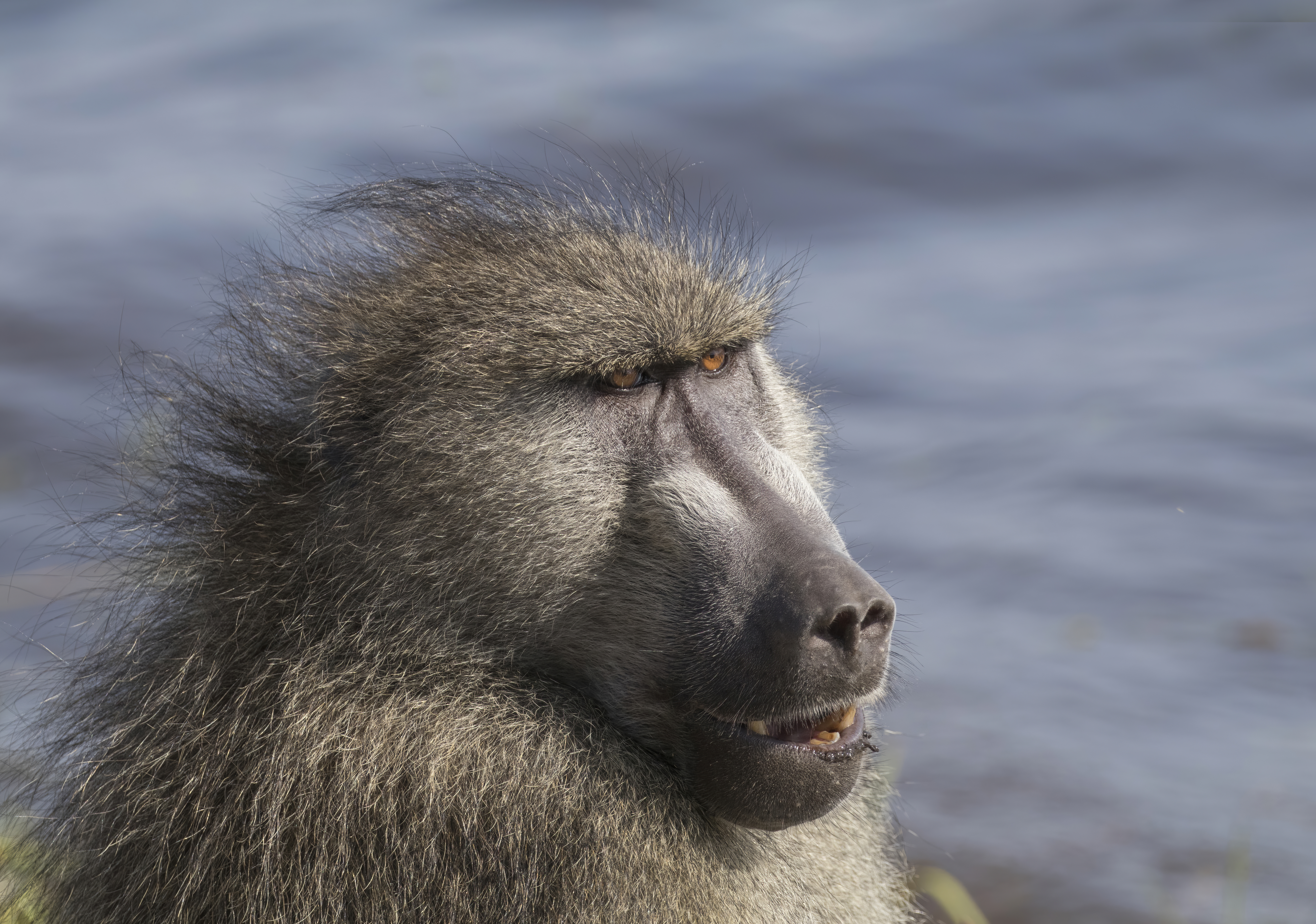
Male P. u. griseipes
Chobe National Park

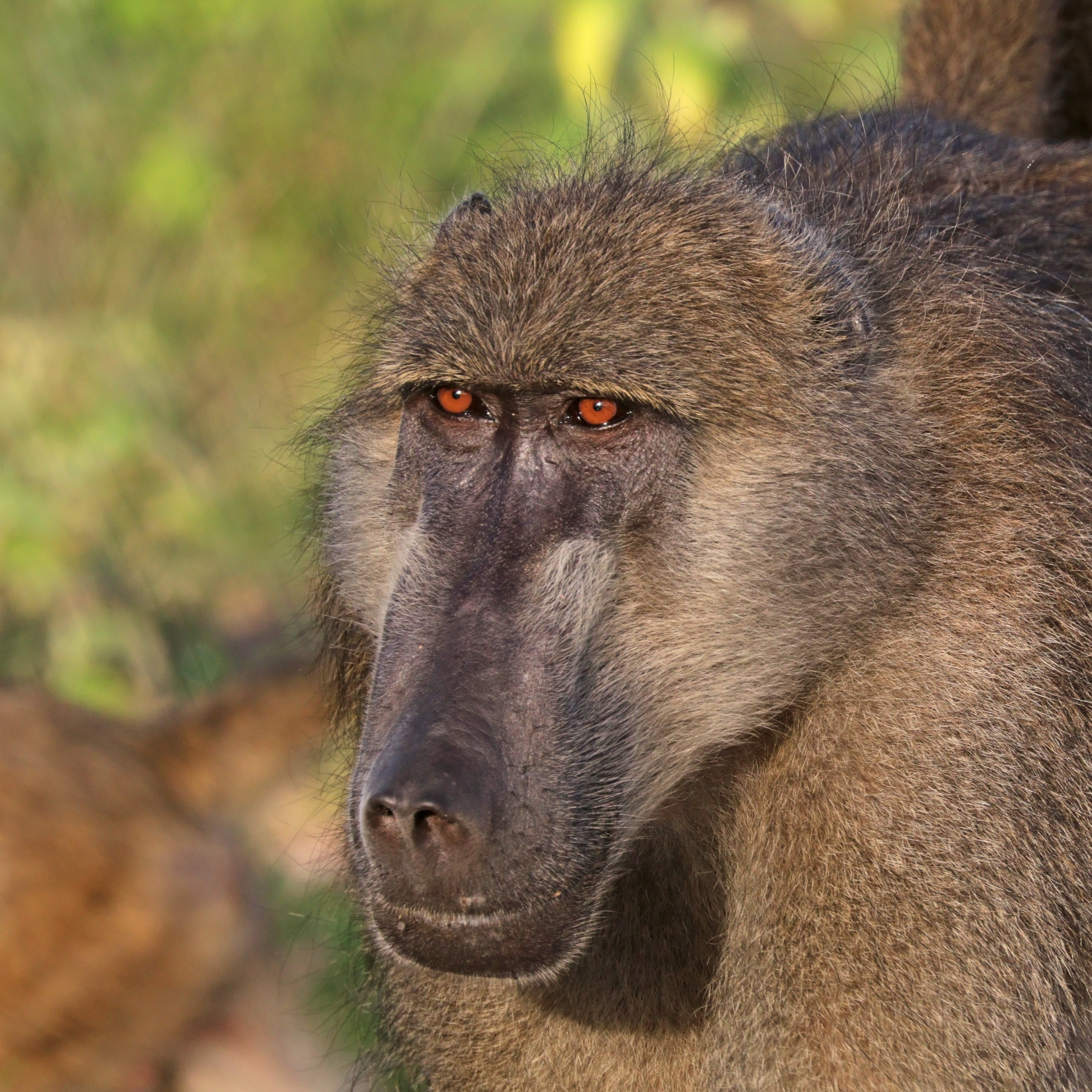
Female P. u. griseipes
Chobe National Park

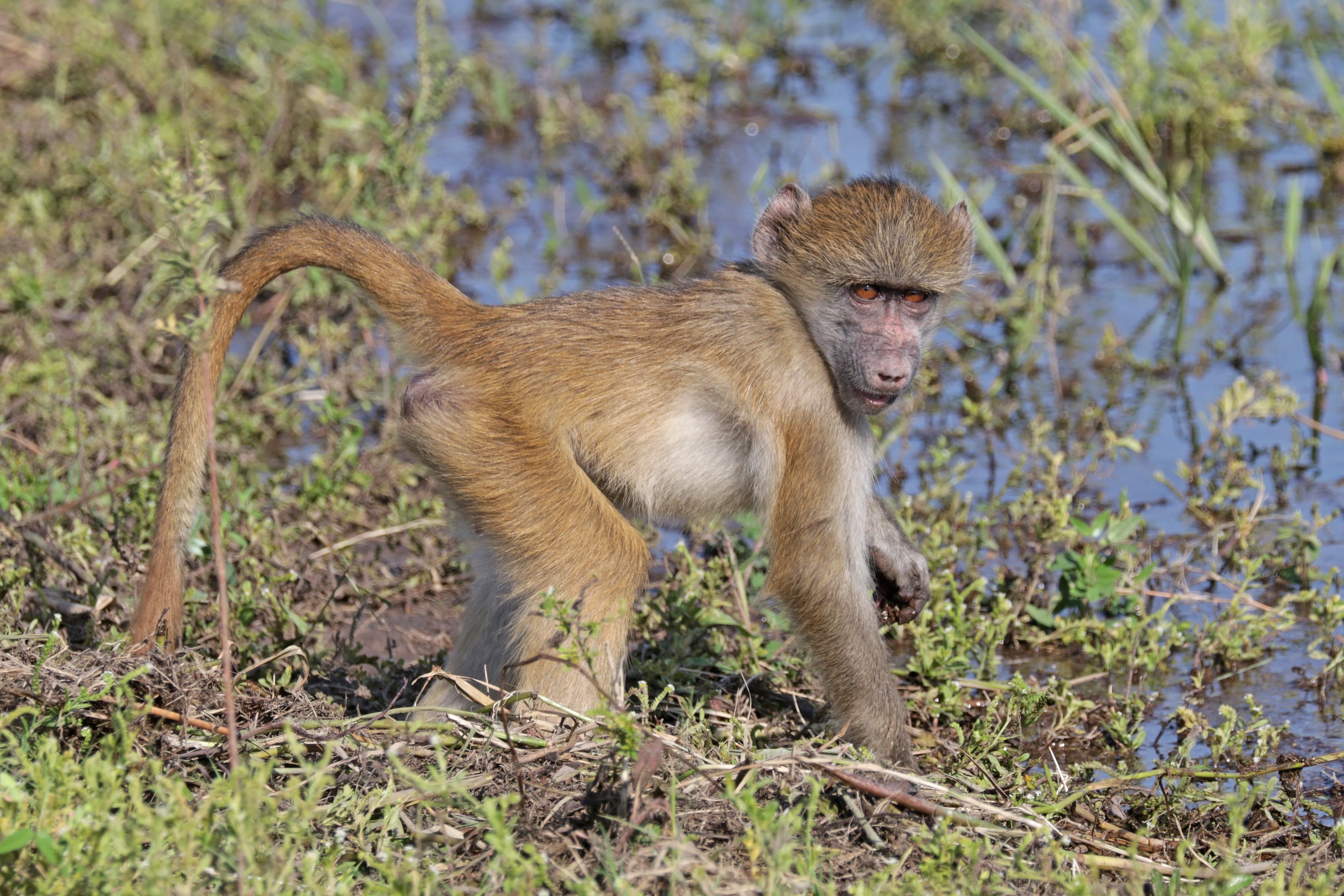
Juvenile P. u. griseipes
Chobe National Park

== Physical description ==
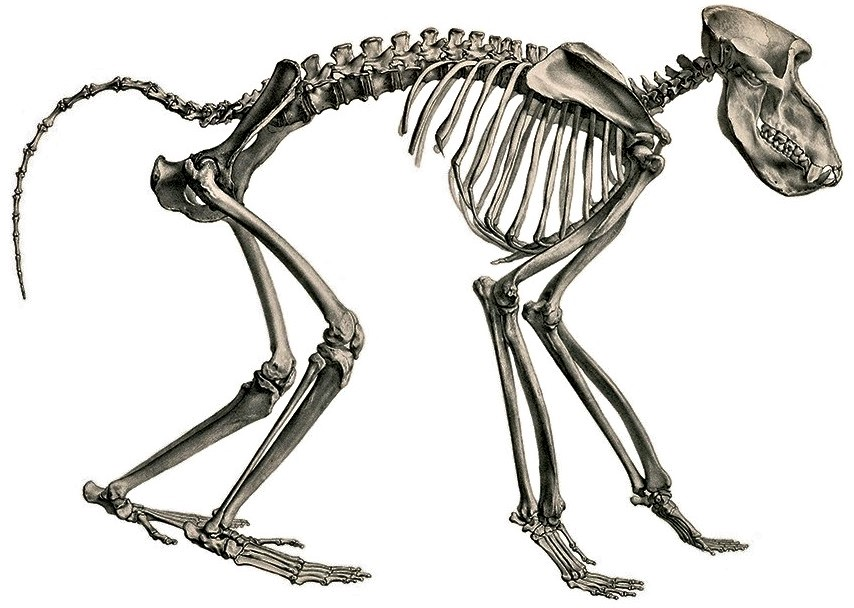
Chacma baboon skeleton

The chacma baboon is perhaps the longest species of monkey, with an adult body length of 50 to 115 cm (20 to 45 in) and tail length of 45 to 84 cm (18 to 33 in). It is also one of the heaviest; the male weighs from 21 to 45 kg (46 to 99 lb) with an average of 31.8 kg (70 lb). Baboons are sexually dimorphic, and females are considerably smaller than males. The adult female chacma weighs from 12 to 25 kg (26 to 55 lb), with an average of 15.4 kg (34 lb). Adult males can in some instances be about twice as long and three times as heavy as adult females. It is similar in size to the olive baboon, averaging slightly higher in mean body mass, and of similar weight to the more compact mandrill, the males of which weigh on average about 1 kg (2.2 lb) more than a chacma baboon, the females weigh 3 kg (6.6 lb) less than the female chacma. While the mandrill is usually crowned the largest of all modern monkeys, going on total length and average (but not maximum) body weight between the sexes, the chacma baboon appears to be the largest extant monkey. The chacma baboon is generally dark brown to gray in color, with a patch of rough hair on the nape of its neck. Unlike the males of northern baboon species (the Guinea, hamadryas, and olive baboons), chacma males do not have a mane. Perhaps the most distinctive feature of this baboon is its long, downward-sloping face. The canine teeth of male chacma baboons have a mean length of 3.86 ± 0.30 cm (1.52 ± 0.12 in) at the time they emigrate from their natal troop. This is the time of greatest tooth length as the teeth tend to wear or be broken thereafter.

The three subspecies are differentiated by size and color. The Cape chacma is a large, heavy, dark-brown, and has black feet. The gray-footed chacma is slightly smaller than the Cape chacma, lighter in color and build, and has gray feet. The Ruacana chacma generally appears to be a smaller, less darkly colored version of the Cape chacma.

== Ecology ==
=== Habitat and distribution ===
The chacma baboon inhabits a wide array of habitats including woodland, savanna, steppes, and sub desert, from the grassy alpine slopes of the Drakensberg to the Kalahari Desert. During the night, the chacma baboon sleeps atop steep hills, high cliffs or rocks or in large trees, away from nocturnal predators. In daytime, water availability may limit its range in arid areas. It is found throughout southern Africa, ranging from South Africa north to Angola, Zambia, and Mozambique. The subspecies are divided across this range. The Cape chacma is found in southern South Africa; the gray-footed chacma, is present from northern South Africa, through the Okavango Delta in Botswana, Zimbabwe, Mozambique (south of the Zambezi), to southwest Zambia; and the Ruacana chacma is found in northern Namibia and southern Angola.

=== Diet ===
The chacma baboon is an omnivorous highly opportunistic feeder, and will eat practically anything; typical foods include fruits, seeds, grass, blossoms, bulbs, bark, insects, spiders, worms, grubs, rodents, birds, small antelope and fungi (the desert truffle Kalaharituber pfeilii). Chacma baboon diet is thought to contain about 2 percent animal-sourced food, most of which consists of invertebrates; proportions vary between populations. Baboons are considered vermin by most African farmers due to their foraging and damage to cultivated crops and livestock. At the Cape of Good Hope in particular, chacma baboons are also known for taking shellfish and other small marine invertebrates. It is generally a scavenger when it comes to game meat, and rarely engages in hunting larger animals. One incident of a chacma baboon killing a human infant has been reported, but the event is so rare, the locals believed it was due to witchcraft. Normally, wild chacma baboons will flee at the approach of humans, though this is changing due to the easy availability of food and garbage from human dwellings in villages and towns near the baboons' habitat.

=== Predation ===
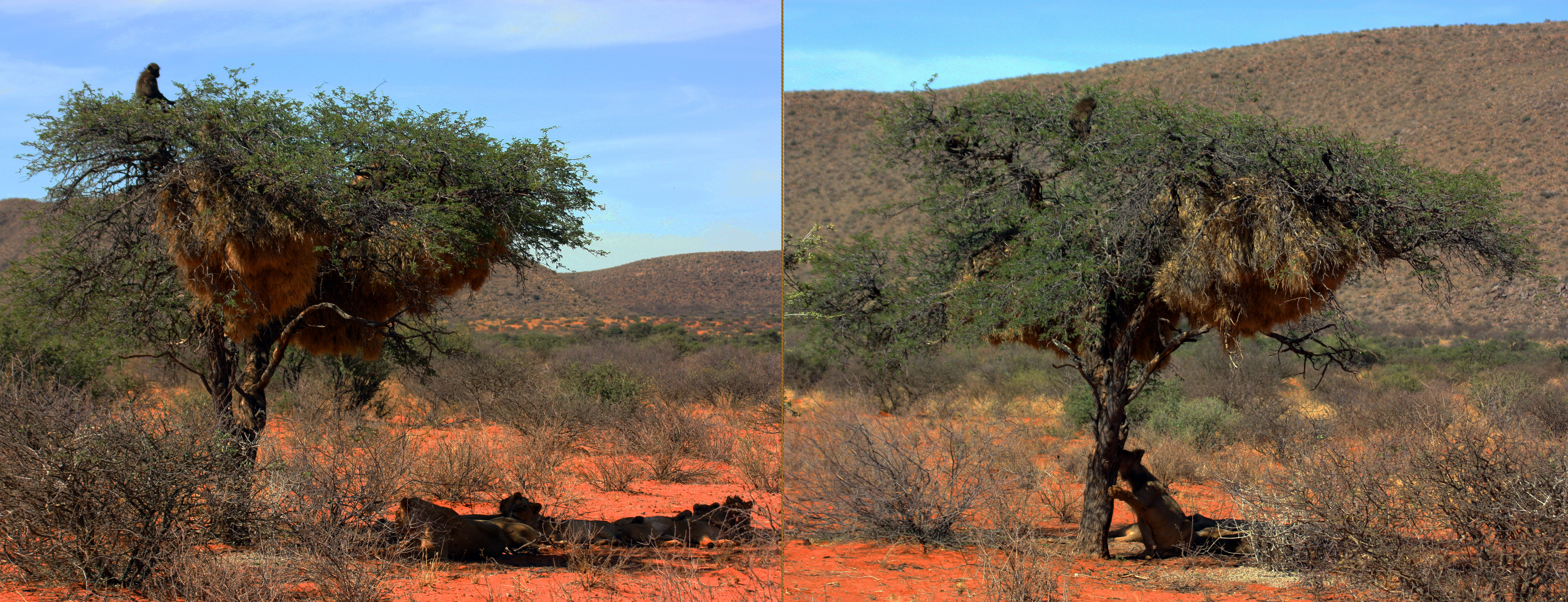
Trapped up tree by Kalahari lions Tswalu Kalahari Reserve, South Africa

Despite their formidable nature and large size, chacma baboons are vulnerable to a variety of predators. The main wild predator of adult chacma baboons is the leopard. In the Waterberg Biosphere, chacma baboon comprised 20.2% of leopard kills and 18.7% of the leopard's prey biomass. Although previously little documented, the African wild dog, a predator of similar or even slightly inferior size to male baboons themselves, in Mana Pools National Park (Zimbabwe) took to chacma baboons as their main prey, comprising 44% of 118 kills. Less routine predation on chacma baboons has been reportedly committed by lions, spotted hyena, Nile crocodiles and Southern African rock pythons (in rough descending likelihood of threat). The predators of infant and juvenile chacma baboons are probably even more diverse but poorly documented. It is documented that Verreaux's eagles and martial eagles have taken young chacma baboons and probable or possible predation has been committed by other eagles: crowned eagles and tawny eagles.

When approaching potentially dangerous sites such as watering holes, more vulnerable members of the chacma baboon group may travel near the rear of the group but may conversely end up by the front of group out of fear if a predator approaches. The adult male chacma baboon has a fearsome defense and may assault their predators with their large, sharp canine teeth, which can seriously injure predators as formidable as leopards, and (despite being far from exempt from predation) the adult males tend to be the least vulnerable members of the baboon troops. As in other monkeys, the larger, more formidable male baboons may successfully defend more vulnerable members of the troop via attacking predators if they come into sight.

== Behaviour ==
=== Social organisation ===
Baboon call
A dominant male baboon calls to his troop.

The chacma baboon usually lives in social groups, called troops, which are composed of multiple adult males, adult females, and their offspring. Occasionally, however, very small groups form that consist of only a single adult male and several adult females.

Chacma troops are characterized by a dominance hierarchy. Female ranking within the troop is inherited through the mother and remains relatively fixed, while the male ranking is often in flux. Chacmas are unusual among baboons in that neither males nor females form strong relationships with members of the same sex. Instead, the strongest social bonds are often between unrelated adult males and females. Infanticide is much more common among Chacmas than other baboon species, as newly dominant males may kill infants or young baboons sired by the previously dominant male. Baboon troops possess a complex group behavior and communicate by means of body attitudes, facial expressions, vocalizations and touch.

=== Reproduction ===
Chacma baboons do not have a specific breeding season; they breed through the year. On average, males and females reach sexual maturity around 5 years, but males typically don't breed successfully until they are large enough to challenge other males, around 7 to 10 years old. Mothers give birth on average every 1.5 to 2 years and usually have only one infant at a time. It takes about one year for those infants to reach independence.

=== Morning dispersal patterns ===
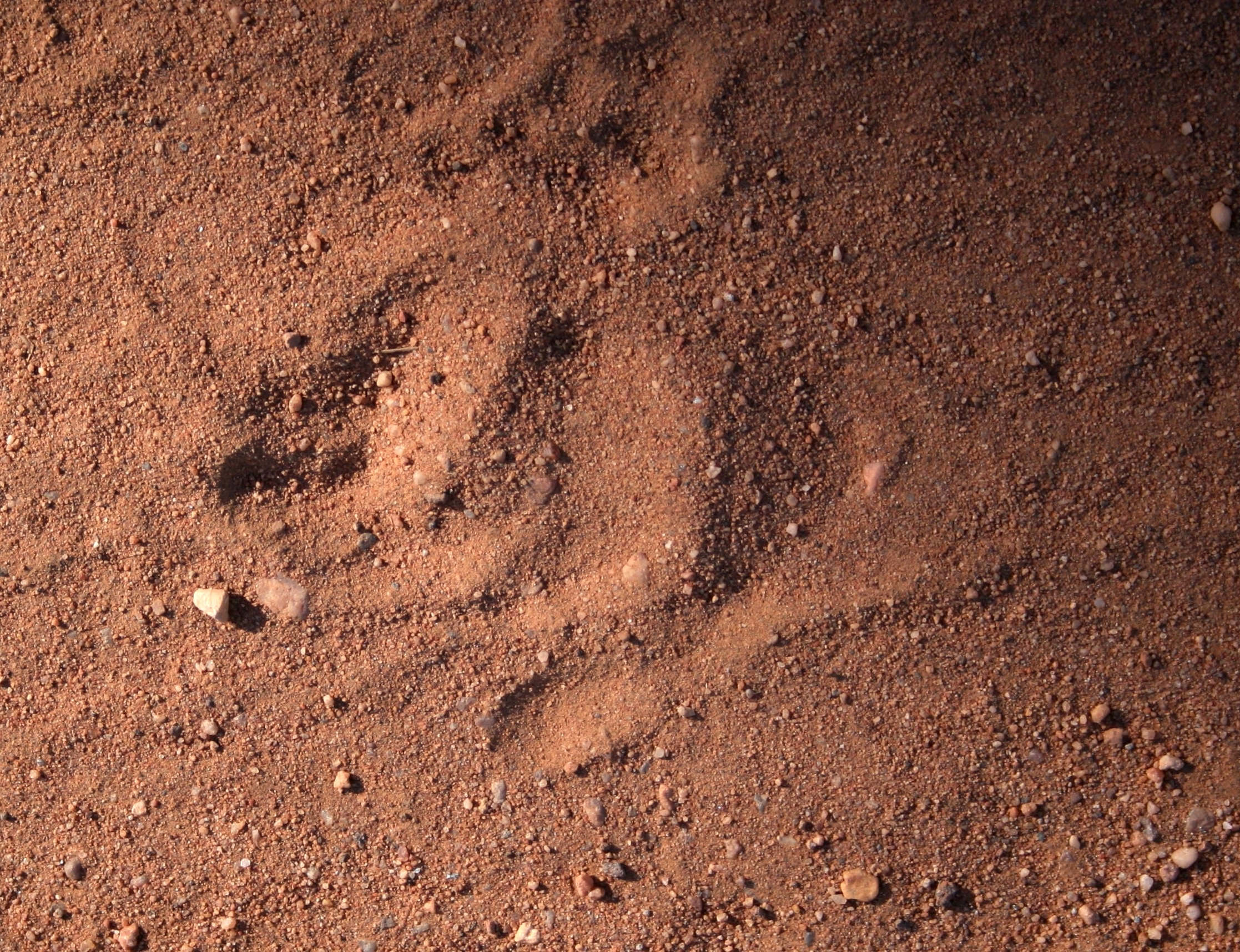
Print of the large foot (pes) in sand, revealing i.a. the heel and thumb. The manus print in contrast reveals only the knuckles, the short, straight fingers and tip of the partly opposable thumb.

At night, chacma baboons often sleep in large groups on high rocks, cliffs, or in tall trees to avoid nocturnal predators. Members of a troop tend to rise and disperse together each morning. In most cases, dispersal is initiated by a single individual and the other members of the group decide whether or not to follow. The dominance hierarchy does not play a significant role in initiating the morning dispersal, but social affiliation does. Group members are more likely to follow the behavior of individuals with which they are closely affiliated.

=== Foraging behaviour ===
Dominance does play a role in group foraging decisions. A dominant individual (usually the alpha male) leads the group to easily monopolised resources. The group usually follows, even though many subordinate members cannot gain access to that particular resource. As in morning dispersal, the inclination of group members to follow the leader is positively associated with social interactions with that dominant individual.

Collective foraging behaviour, with many individuals taking advantage of the same resource at once, has also been observed. However, this behavior can be chiefly attributed to shared dietary needs rather than social affiliation. Pregnant females, who share similar dietary needs, are more likely to synchronise their behaviour than fertile females. Foraging synchronization decreases in areas with lower food density.

=== Adoption ===
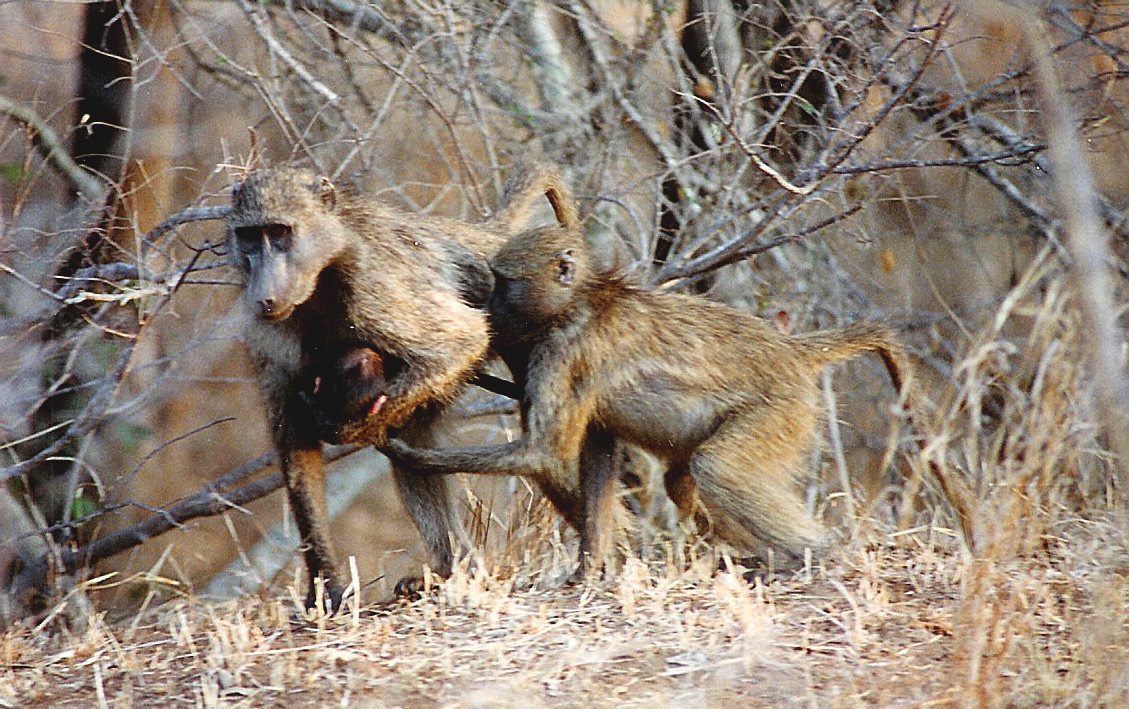
Chacma baboons have been observed to adopt orphaned young.

Adoption behaviour has been observed in chacma baboons. Orphaned baboons whose mothers have died or disappeared are often too small to care for themselves. In one study of nine natural orphans and three introduced orphans, all but one orphan were adopted by another member of the troop. The individual that was not adopted was 16 months old and old enough to survive on its own.

Adoption behaviour includes sleeping close to the orphaned infant, grooming and carrying the orphan, and protecting them from harassment by other members of the troop. Both males and females care for infants, and care does not depend on the infant's sex. Nearly all caregivers are pre-reproductive, only four or five years of age. The two major theories explaining this behavior are kin selection, in which caregivers take care of potentially related orphans, and parental practice, in which young baboons increase their own fitness by using an orphan to practice their own parenting skills.

=== Friendship ===
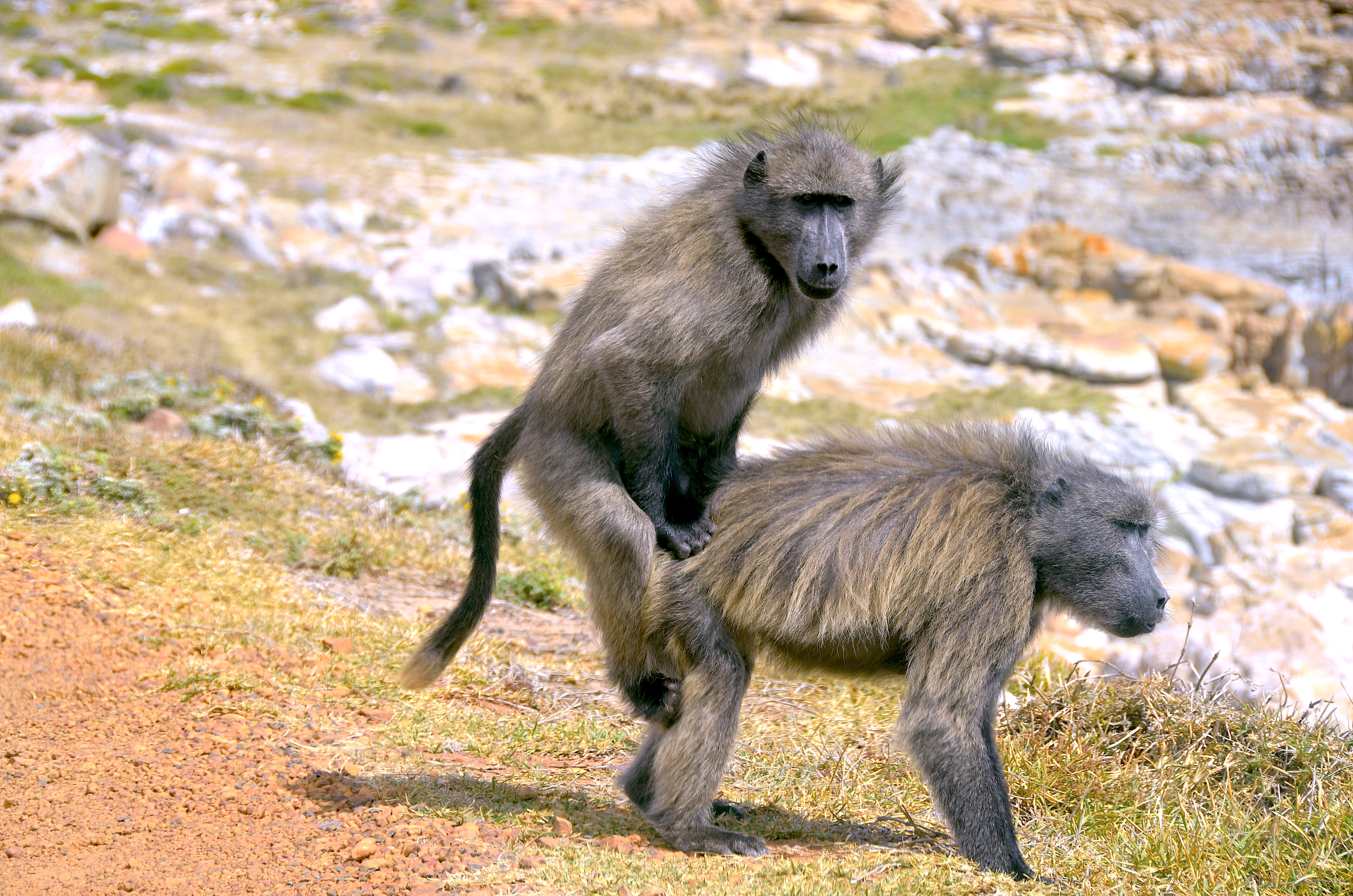
Chacma baboons mating at Cape Point in South Africa

Males and female chacma baboons often form relationships referred to as "friendships". These cooperative relationships generally occur between lactating females and adult males. The females are believed to seek out male friendships to gain protection from infanticide. In many baboon species, immigrant alpha males often practice infanticide upon arrival in a new troop. By killing unrelated infants, the new male shortens the time until he can mate with the females of the troop. A female with dependent offspring generally does not become sexually receptive until she weans her offspring at around 12 months of age. However, a mother usually becomes sexually receptive shortly after the death of her offspring.

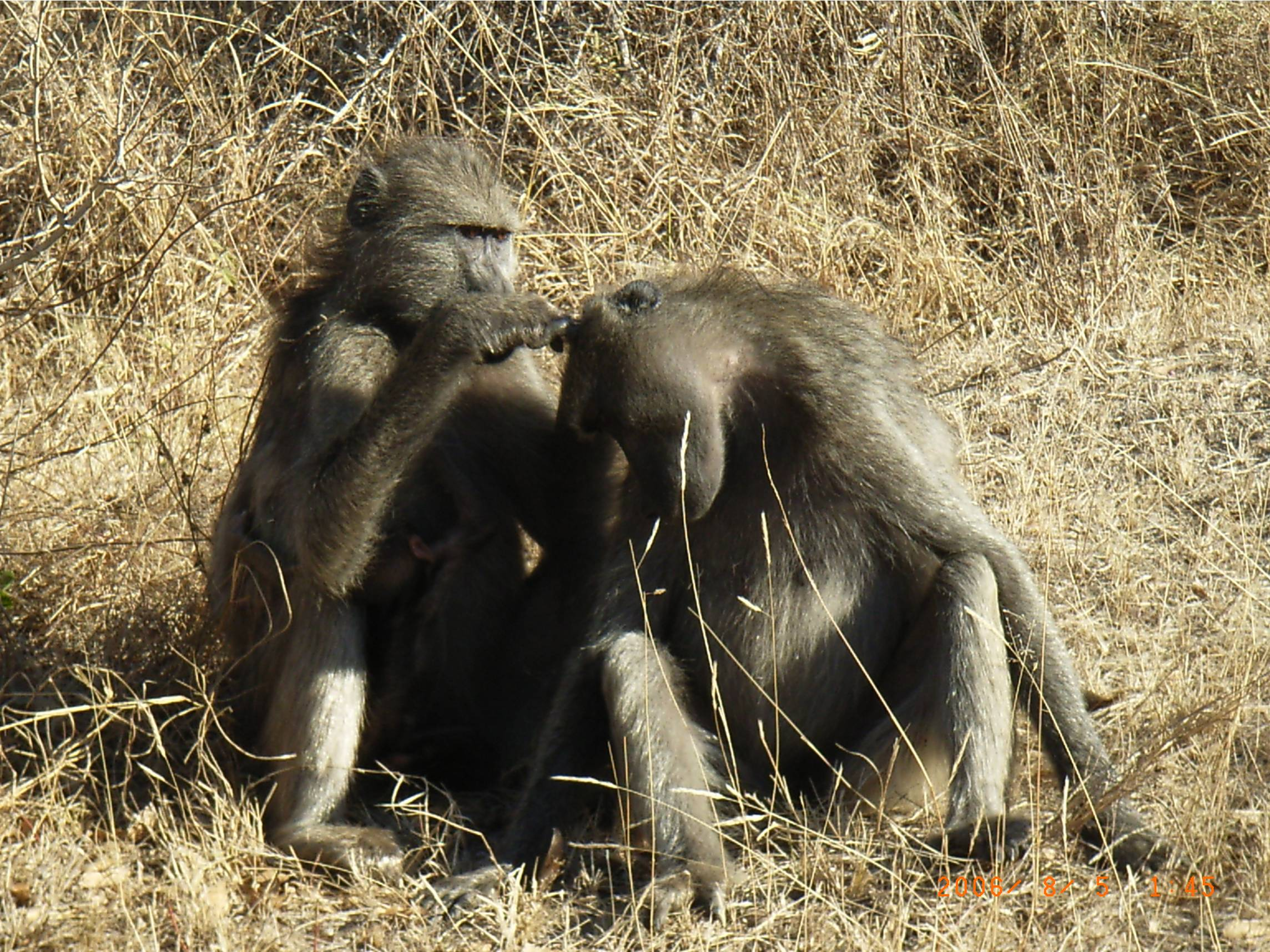
Grooming strengthens bonds between individuals in groups

This protection hypothesis is supported by studies of stress hormones in female baboons during changes in the male hierarchy. When an immigrant male ascends to the top of the male dominance hierarchy, stress hormones in lactating and pregnant females increases, while stress hormones in females not at risk of infanticide stay the same. Additionally, females in friendships with males exhibit a smaller rise in stress hormones than do females without male friends.

The benefits of friendship to males are less clear. A male is more likely to enter into friendships with females with which he has mated, which indicates males might enter into friendships to protect their own offspring and not just to protect that female's future reproductive success. These friendships may play a role in the mating system of chacma baboons. A female will often mate with several males, which increases the number of potential fathers for her offspring and increases the chances she will be able to find at least one friend willing to protect her infants and assist in caring for them.

Female chacma baboons have been observed to compete with each other for male friends. This may be the result of one male having a high probability of paternity with multiple females. These competitions are heavily influenced by the female dominance hierarchy, with dominant females displacing subordinate females in friendships with males. Generally, when a more-dominant female attempts to make friends with an individual which is already the friend of a subordinate female, the subordinate female reduces grooming and spatial proximity to that male, potentially leaving her offspring at higher risk of infanticide.

== Relationship with humans ==
=== Conservation ===
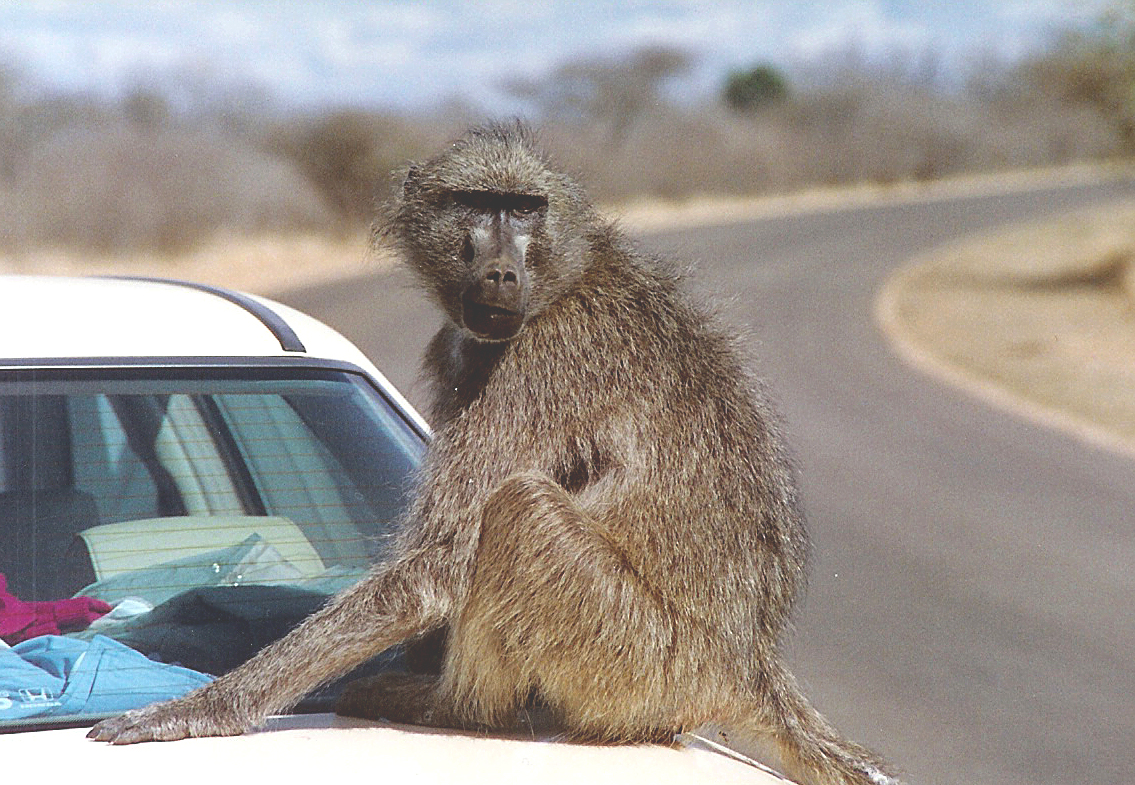
Many Chacma baboons that live in proximity to humans are frequently killed as vermin.

The chacma baboon does not rank among threatened animal species. However, in some confined locations, such as South Africa's Southern Cape Peninsula, local populations are dwindling due to habitat loss and predation from other protected species, such as leopards and lions. Many troops have become a suburban menace in their search for food, overturning garbage cans, and breaking into cars and houses where they cause much damage. These troops can be dangerous and aggressive and they will not hesitate to steal food directly from people. These negative encounters have resulted in the baboons being hunted and poisoned by frustrated local residents. This isolated population is thought to face extinction within 10 years.

The chacma is listed under Appendix II of CITES as it occurs in many protected areas across its range. The only area in South Africa where they are monitored is in the Cape Peninsula, where they are protected.

Observations by those working hands-on in South Africa's rehabilitation centers have found this species is damaged by human intervention; troop structures are influenced, and over the years a significant loss in numbers has occurred. Because they live near and invade human habitats, urban baboons are regularly shot, poisoned, electrocuted, beaten to death, intentionally struck by cars and captured for research laboratories and muti (traditional medicine). Despite this, assessors working for the IUCN believe there are no major threats that could result in a range-wide decline of the species.

== See also ==
- Fred the baboon
- Jack the Signalman
- Corporal Jackie
