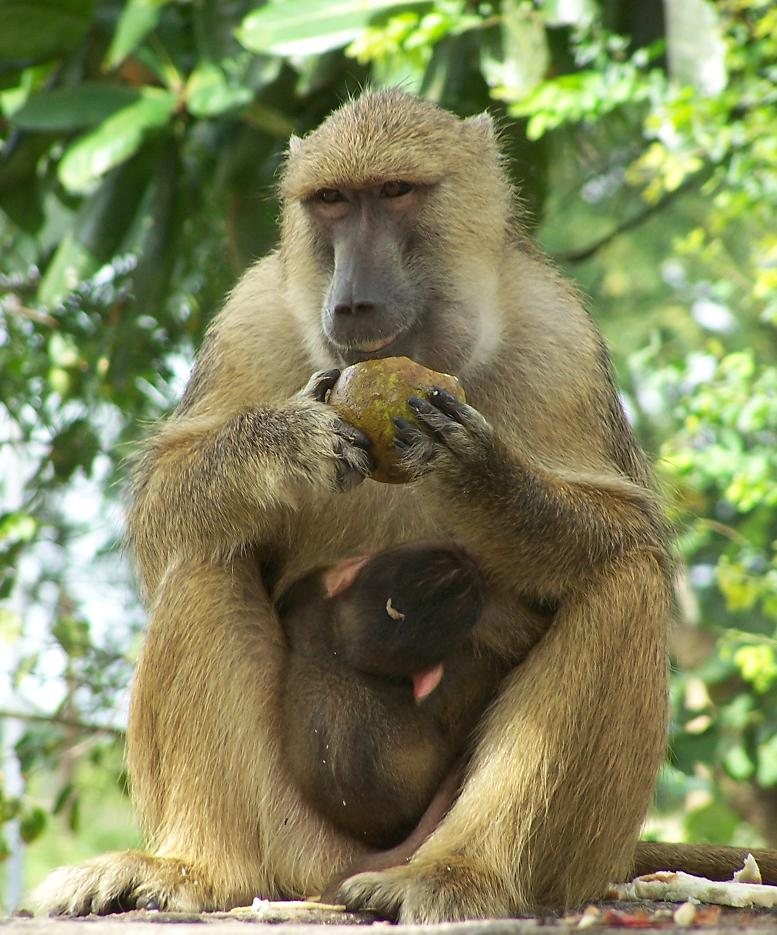

Conservation status
- Least Concern (IUCN 3.1)

Scientific classification
- Kingdom: Animalia
- Phylum: Chordata
- Class: Mammalia
- Infraclass: Placentalia
- Order: Primates
- Family: Cercopithecidae
- Genus: Papio
- Species: P. cynocephalus

Binomial name
- Papio cynocephalus (Linnaeus, 1766)
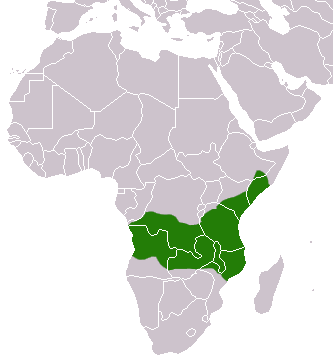
- Distribution of yellow baboon

Synonyms
- Simia cynocephalus Linnaeus, 1766

Audio
- Calls recorded in Ramis, Kenya

= Yellow baboon =

Species of baboon

The yellow baboon (Papio cynocephalus) is a baboon in the family of Old World monkeys. The species epithet means "dog-head" in Greek, due to the dog-like shape of the muzzle and head. Yellow baboons have slim bodies with long arms and legs along with yellowish-brown hair. They resemble the chacma baboon, but are somewhat smaller and with a less elongated muzzle. Their hairless faces are black, framed with white sideburns. Males can grow to about 84 cm (33 in), females to about 60 cm (24 in). They have long tails which grow to be nearly as long as their bodies. The average life span of the yellow baboon in the wild is roughly 15–20 years; some may live up to 30 years.

Yellow baboons inhabit savannas and light forests in eastern Africa, from Kenya and Tanzania to Zimbabwe and Botswana. They are diurnal, terrestrial, and live in complex, mixed-gender social groups of 8 to 200 individuals per troop. Like all other baboon species, they are omnivorous, with a preference for fruits; they also eat plants, leaves, seeds, grasses, bulbs, bark, blossoms and fungi, as well as worms, grubs, insects, spiders, scorpions, birds, rodents and small mammals. All species of baboons are highly opportunistic feeders and will eat virtually any food they can find.

Baboons fulfill several functions in their ecosystem, not only serving as food for larger predators, but also dispersing seeds in their waste and through their messy foraging habits. They are also efficient predators of smaller animals and their young.

Baboons have been able to fill a variety of ecological niches, including places inhospitable to other animals, such as regions taken over by human settlement. Thus, they are one of the most successful African primates and are not listed as threatened or endangered. However, the same behavioral adaptations that make them so successful also cause them to be considered pests by humans in many areas. Raids on farmers' crops and livestock and other such intrusions into human settlements have made most baboons species subject to many organized extermination projects. However, continued habitat loss forces more and more baboons to migrate toward areas of human settlement.

The two subspecies of the yellow baboon are:

- Papio cynocephalus cynocephalus (typical yellow baboon)
- Papio cynocephalus ibeanus (Ibean baboon)

== Behavior ==
Yellow baboons use at least ten different vocalizations to communicate. When traveling as a group, males will lead, females and young stay safely in the middle, and less-dominant males bring up the rear. A baboon group's hierarchy is a serious matter, and some subspecies have developed behaviors intended to avoid confrontation and retaliation. For example, males may use infants as a kind of "passport" or shield for safe approach toward another male. One male will pick up the infant and hold it up as it nears the other male. This action often calms the other male and allows the first male to approach safely.

An area of active research on yellow baboons is the role of their social habits in the composition of their gut microbiome. One group of researchers found that social group membership and interaction rates affected baboon microbiome composition, which they suggested could be due to accidental fecal-oral transmission during grooming periods, even though yellow baboons are not coprophagic. Accidental fecal-oral transmission during close contact may be especially important for the transmission of gut microbes that cannot survive long in the environment, such as those that are non-spore forming. Another group found evidence that male dispersal affected the gut microbiome of the immigrant individual. Immigrant males may acquire a similar gut microbiome to their new groups through dietary changes and being introduced to new microbes through social interactions such as grooming, which lead to more direct transmission of microbes.

== Gallery ==
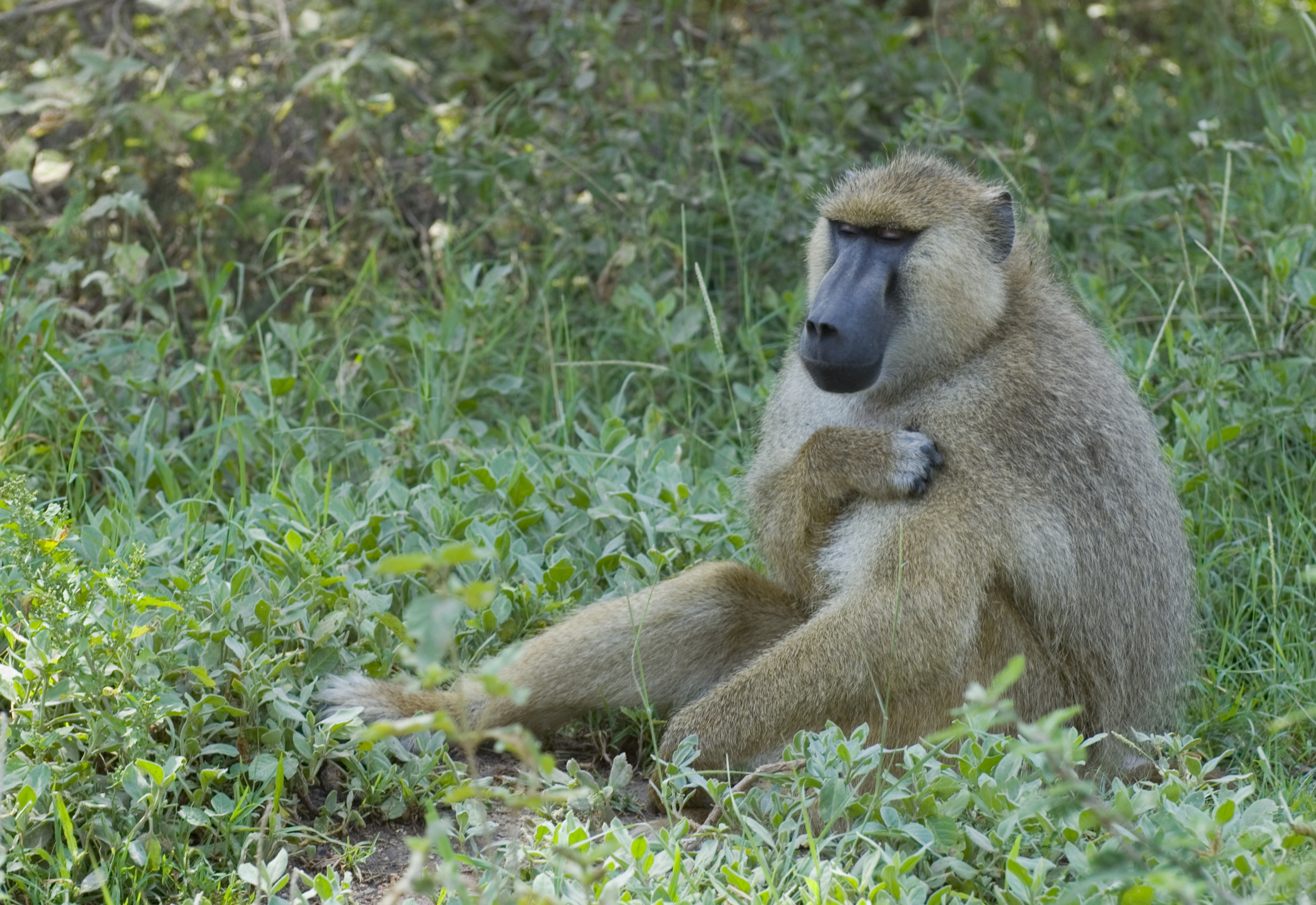
Amboseli National Park

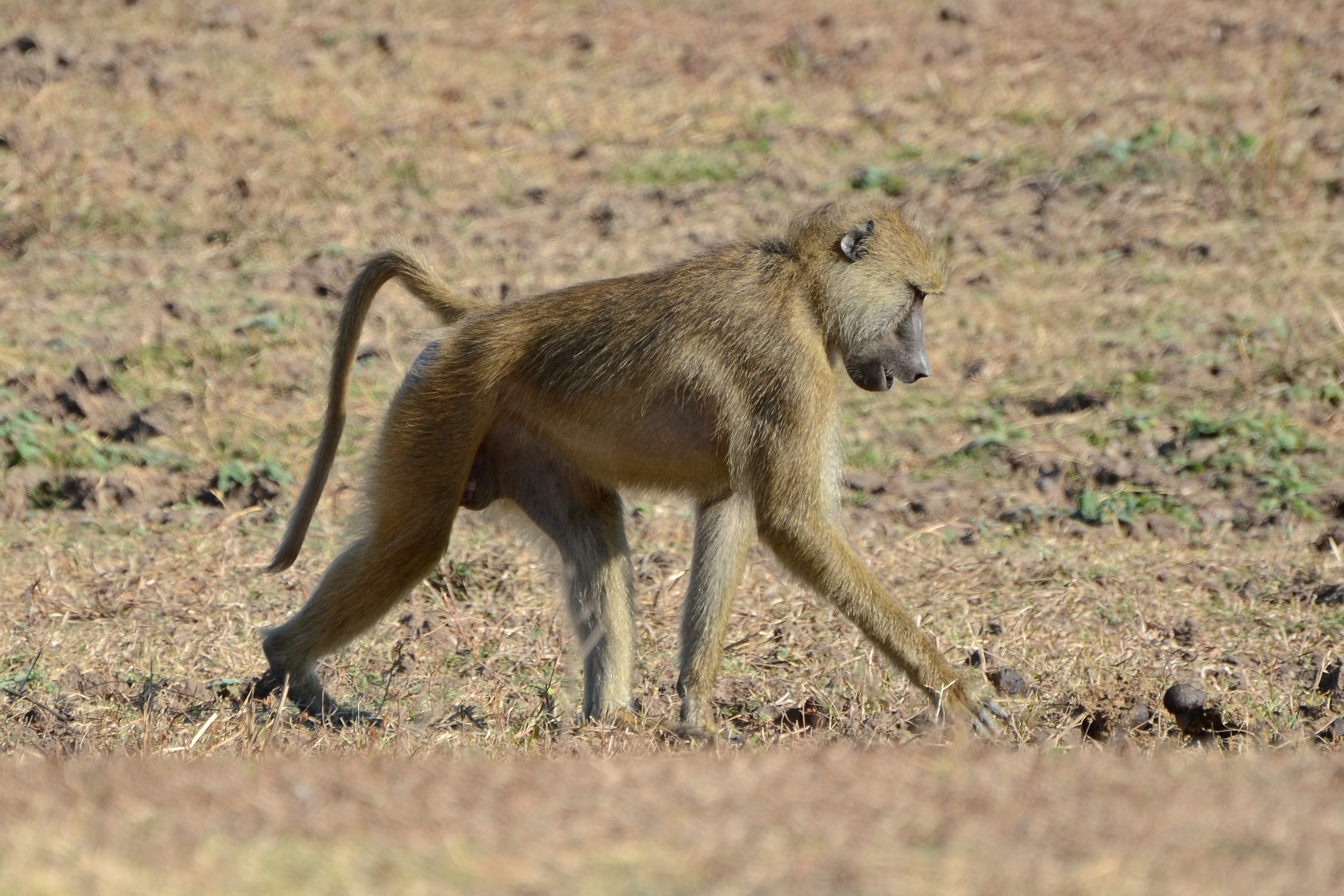
South Luangwa National Park

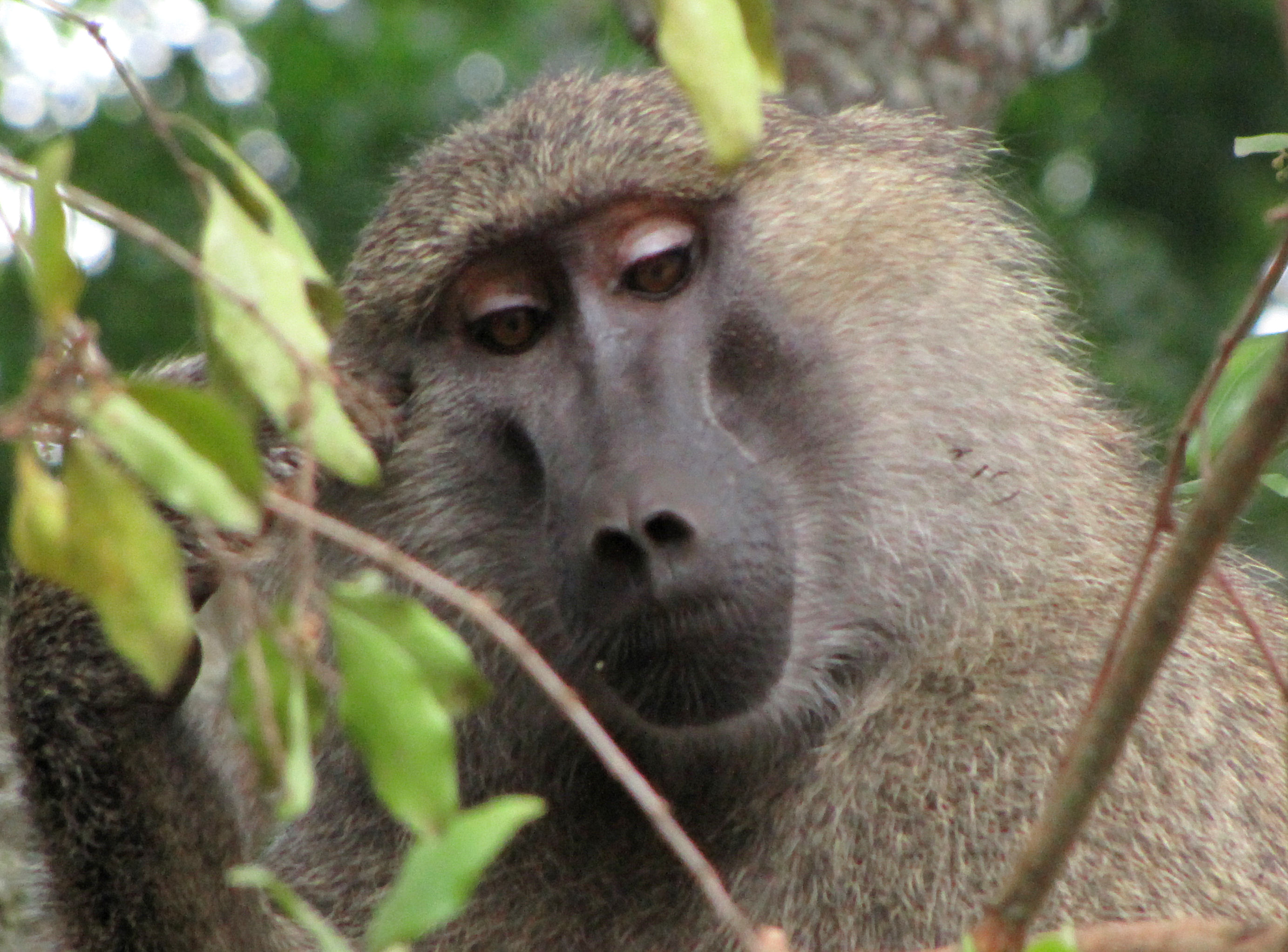
Serengeti National Park
