= 1992 Tooheys 1000 =

Motor race in Australia

Seasons
- ← 1991 1993 →

Layout of the Mount Panorama Circuit

The 1992 Tooheys 1000 was the 33rd running of the Bathurst 1000 touring car race. It was held on 4 October 1992, at the Mount Panorama Circuit just outside Bathurst. The race was held for cars eligible for International Group A touring car regulations and a class available for those who had built cars eligible to the new for 1993 class, CAMS Group 3A touring car regulations.

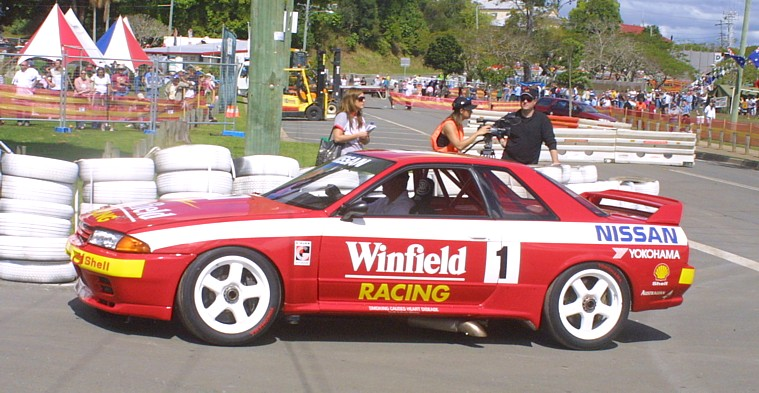
The winning Skaife/Richards Nissan GT-R

The race was won for the second year in a row by Jim Richards and Mark Skaife driving a Gibson Motorsport prepared Nissan Skyline GT-R, the pair becoming the first back-to-back Bathurst winners since Peter Brock and Larry Perkins won in 1983 and 1984. Richards and Skaife had to be declared the winners after a rainstorm swept across the race in the closing stages, causing many accidents in conditions deemed by race officials too dangerous to continue. The race results were issued as at the end of the 143rd lap, 18 laps short of full race distance. This was the second time in the event's history where the race was stopped and results declared before the scheduled laps were completed (the previous occasion was in 1981).

The Dick Johnson Racing run Ford Sierra of Dick Johnson and John Bowe was classified in second position with Richards and Skaife's teammates Anders Olofsson and Neil Crompton in third. Former Formula One World Champion Denny Hulme suffered a heart attack at the wheel; he came to a halt at the side of the track and was pronounced dead at the hospital where he was taken.

== Class structure and entry list ==
=== Class structure ===
Class A

For Group A cars of over 1600cc engine capacity.
It featured 10 Ford Sierras, 1 Nissan Skyline HR31 GTS-R, 3 Nissan Skyline R32 GT-Rs, 1 Toyota Supra (A70), 11 Holden VL Commodores, 4 Holden VN Commodores, 3 BMW M3 (E30)s, 1 BMW M3s and 1 BMW 635CSi.

Class B

For Group A cars of under 1600cc engine capacity.
It was composed exclusively of 10 Toyota Corollas; 6 Toyota Corolla (E80)s and 4 Toyota Corolla (E90)s.

Class C

A class for the new V8 touring car class that would take over Australian touring car racing in 1993 that would later become known as V8 Supercar.
It was composed of 3 Holden VP Commodores and 1 Ford EB Falcon.

=== Entry list ===
47 cars were entered in the race.

No.	Class	Drivers	Team (Sponsor)	Car	No.	Class	Drivers	Team (Sponsor)	Car
1	A	(New Zealand) Jim Richards (Australia) Mark Skaife	Gibson Motorsport (Winfield)	Nissan Skyline R32	30	C	(Australia) Glenn Seton (Australia) Alan Jones	Glenn Seton Racing (Peter Jackson)	Ford Falcon EB
2	A	(Sweden) Anders Olofsson (Australia) Neil Crompton	Gibson Motorsport (Winfield)	Nissan Skyline R32	31	A	(New Zealand) Robbie Ker (Australia) Don Watson	Car-Trek Racing (Tic Tac)	Holden Commodore VL
3	A	(Australia) Trevor Ashby (Australia) Steve Reed	Lansvale Smash Repairs (Dulux ICI Autocolor)	Holden Commodore VN	34	A	(Australia) Ray Gulson (Australia) Graham Gulson (New Zealand) Peter Beck	Gulson Racing (NEC)	BMW 635 (E24)
4	A	(Australia) Mark Gibbs (Australia) Rohan Onslow	Bob Forbes Racing (GIO Insurance)	Nissan Skyline R32	35	A	(Australia) Wayne Park (Australia) David Parsons	Glenn Seton Racing (Peter Jackson)	Ford Sierra RS500
05	C	(Australia) Peter Brock (Germany) Manuel Reuter	Advantage Racing (Mobil 1)	Holden Commodore VP	36	A	(Australia) Ken Mathews (Australia) Rod Jones (United Kingdom) Mike Newton	Rod Jones Racing (DVST)	Ford Sierra RS500
6	A	(Australia) Alf Grant (Australia) Tim Grant	Alf Grant Racing (Sizzler)	Nissan Skyline R31	37	A	(Australia) John Bourke (Australia) Keith Carling	Roger Alexander Racing (Cessnock Toyota)	Toyota Supra (A70)
7	A	(Australia) Peter Hopwood (Australia) Terry Bosnjak	Colin Bond Racing (Caltex CXT)	Ford Sierra RS500	39	A	(Australia) Bill O'Brien (Australia) Barry Graham (Australia) Brian Callaghan, Jr.	O'Brien Motorsport (Everlast Automotive)	Holden Commodore VL
8	A	(Australia) Colin Bond (Australia) John Smith	Colin Bond Racing (Caltex CXT)	Ford Sierra RS500	40	A	(Australia) Garry Willmington (Australia) Tom Watkinson	Leeson Racing (Hugo Boss, Willmington Performance)	Holden Commodore VL
9	A	(Australia) Charlie O'Brien (Australia) Gary Brabham	Allan Moffat Racing (Cenovis)	Ford Sierra RS500	41	A	(Australia) Andrew Harris (Australia) Gary Cooke	Daily Planet Racing (Daily Planet)	Holden Commodore VL
10	A	(Germany) Klaus Niedzwiedz (Australia) Gregg Hansford	Allan Moffat Racing (Cenovis)	Ford Sierra RS500	42	A	(Australia) Graham Moore (Australia) Wayne Gardner	Bob Forbes Racing (Strathfield Car Radios)	Holden Commodore VN
11	A	(Australia) Larry Perkins (Australia) Steve Harrington	Perkins Engineering (Bob Jane T-Marts)	Holden Commodore VL	44	A	(Australia) Stuart McColl (Australia) Peter Gazzard	Stuart McColl Motorsport (Channel 9 Adelaide, Kart Mania)	Holden Commodore VL
13	A	(Australia) Bob Jones (New Zealand) Peter Janson	Bob Jones Racing (Ampol Max 3)	Holden Commodore VL	50	A	(Australia) Bryan Sala (Australia) Kevin Weeks	Sala Racing (Queensland Plastics)	Ford Sierra RS500
14	A	(Australia) Warren Jonsson (Australia) Des Wall	Jonsson Racing (Jonsson Racing)	Holden Commodore VL	52	A	(Australia) Peter Doulman (Australia) John Cotter	Doulman Automotive (Impala Kitchens)	BMW M3 (E30)
15	C	(Australia) Tomas Mezera (Australia) Brad Jones	Holden Racing Team (Castrol, Telecom MobileNet)	Holden Commodore VP	55	A	(Australia) Andrew Miedecke (Australia) Troy Dunstan	Advantage Racing (Mobil 1)	Holden Commodore VN
16	C	(United Kingdom) Win Percy (Australia) Allan Grice	Holden Racing Team (Castrol, Telecom MobileNet)	Holden Commodore VP	70	B	(Australia) Neal Bates (Australia) Rick Bates	Toyota Team Australia (Enzed)	Toyota Corolla (E90)
17	A	(Australia) Dick Johnson (Australia) John Bowe	Dick Johnson Racing (Shell)	Ford Sierra RS500	71	B	(Australia) Jason Bargwanna (Australia) Scott Bargwanna	Toyota Team Australia (Mercantile Mutual)	Toyota Corolla (E90)
18	A	(Australia) Terry Shiel (Australia) Greg Crick (Australia) Cameron McConville	Dick Johnson Racing (Shell)	Ford Sierra RS500	72	B	(Australia) Gregg Easton (Australia) Brad Stratton (Australia) David Sala	Adrian Brooke Racing (Apex Electrical Contractors)	Toyota Corolla (E80)
20	A	(New Zealand) Denny Hulme (Australia) Paul Morris	LoGaMo Racing (Benson & Hedges)	BMW M3 (E30)	73	B	(Australia) Bob Holden (Australia) Dennis Rogers (Australia) Garry Jones	Bob Holden Motors (INJEC)	Toyota Corolla (E80)
22	A	(Australia) John Trimble (Australia) Rohan Cooke	Daily Planet Racing (Daily Planet)	Holden Commodore VL	74	B	(Australia) Peter Verheyen (Australia) Geoff Full	Peter Verheyen Racing (Carrera Sunglasses)	Toyota Corolla (E80)
25	A	(Australia) Tony Longhurst (Venezuela) Johnny Cecotto	LoGaMo Racing (Benson & Hedges)	BMW M3 (E30)	75	B	(Australia) Frank Binding (Australia) Bob Tindal	Binding Smash Repairs (Binding Smash Repairs)	Toyota Corolla (E90)
26	A	(Australia) Daryl Hendrick (Australia) John Blanchard	Daryl Hendrick Motorsport (Gemspares)	Holden Commodore VL	76	B	(Australia) Mike Conway (Australia) Calvin Gardiner (Australia) Geoff Forshaw	Mountain Motorsport (Hamilton Island Tourism)	Toyota Corolla (E80)
27	A	(Australia) Terry Finnigan (Australia) Garry Rogers	Terry Finnigan Racing Team (Foodtown Supermarkets)	Holden Commodore VN	77	B	(Australia) Malcolm Rea (Australia) Ken Talbert (Australia) Richard Wilson	Malcolm Rea Racing (Motorama, Talken Security)	Toyota Corolla (E80)
28	A	(Australia) Kevin Waldock (Australia) Brett Peters	Playscape Racing (Ampol, AGFA Film)	Ford Sierra RS500	78	B	(Australia) Ted Dunford (Australia) Brad Wright	Bob Holden Motors (Atari, Lynx)	Toyota Corolla (E80)
29	A	(Australia) John English (New Zealand) Ed Lamont	Wayne Douglass Racing (Marathon Foods, Dru-Truss)	Holden Commodore VL	82	B	(Australia) Stuart Murphy (Australia) Chris Barns	Stuart Murphy Motorsport (Laurie Stevens Panelbeaters)	Toyota Corolla (E90)

Icon	Class
A	Class A
B	Class B
C	Class C

== Race ==
"I'm just really stunned for words, I can't believe the reception. I thought Australian race fans had a lot more to go than this, this is bloody disgraceful. I'll keep racing but I tell you what, this is going to remain with me for a long time. You're a pack of arseholes."

— Jim Richards' infamous post race comment.

Nine time Bathurst winner Peter Brock had his worst ever start to the race when the tailshaft of his new VP Commodore broke on the starting line. After sitting on the side of the circuit for a number of laps, the car was eventually towed into the pits where the Mobil 1 crew fitted a new tailshaft while Brock explained to the television audience that it was a brand new tail shaft fitted that morning that had broken. Brock, whose co-driver was German DTM driver and winner of the 1989 24 Hours of Le Mans, Manuel Reuter, rejoined the race on lap 15 in last position. After later breaking a second tailshaft and being pushed into a spin at Forrest's Elbow during the first rain storm by the Holden Racing Team Commodore of Allan Grice which forced Brock to pit when Grice pushed past and ground the front spoiler off of the Mobil 1 Commodore (causing Brock to vent on television about Grice's driving in a rare show of emotion), Brock and Reuter finished in 27th place.

This race was notable for the winning car being crashed and undrivable at the race's conclusion. Due to heavy rain a large number of crashes occurred towards the end of the race leading to the race being stopped during the leader's 144th lap, requiring a windback to the completed 143rd lap. However, confusion occurred as Dick Johnson later passed the line (after the flag was up) and finished what seemed to be the 144th lap. Due to this wind back, Richards' car which had hit the wall once suffering extensive damage—drivable but barely so—and had then slid off the track to join several other cars that had crashed about 200 metres past Forrest's Elbow onto Conrod Straight, was the winner since it was the lead car. Due to high concentrations of Ford and Holden fans and spectators generally upset that a crashed car had won race winner Jim Richards, who drove a Nissan, was vociferously booed as he took the podium. Distressed over the death his friend Denny Hulme which he was only informed about moments before he took to the podium (see below), as well as the crowd's reaction, in his very brief, international live feed broadcast victory speech he told the spectators, "You're a pack of arseholes." (see right for full comment) Richards later apologised for his comments. Richards and Skaife's teammate Neil Crompton (driving alongside Anders Olofsson in the #2 Winfield Nissan) would also express similar disappointment to the crowd's behaviour, giving them the middle finger as he walked off the podium.

The race was also the last in which turbo powered cars such as the Nissan Skyline and Ford Sierra would be permitted to compete. As of 1 January 1993 the turbos were banned in favor of the previously mentioned V8 formula which would later evolve into V8 Supercars.

1992 was also significant in that it saw the return of the Ford Falcon to Bathurst for the first time since the end of the Group C era in 1984. Glenn Seton and new team recruit Alan Jones qualified their 1993 V8 spec Ford EB Falcon in 4th place, the fastest of the 1993 cars (all 4 of which qualified in the Top 10). While the new Falcon V8 performed above even Seton's expectations, unfortunately their race ended on lap 84 with fuel pump failure. The other three 1993 spec cars were the Holden VP Commodore's from the Holden Racing Team and Peter Brock's example.

Australia's 1987 500cc Grand Prix World Champion Wayne Gardner made his touring car racing debut in the race partnering Sydney veteran Graham Moore in Moore's Holden VN Commodore SS Group A SV. Moore qualified the car in 21st position and they eventually finished in 26th place. Gardner's first ever race drive came while rain lashed the circuit. Gardner's presence in the race saw two former Grand Prix motorcycle racing World Champions driving in the race. Johnny Cecotto, who had won World Championships in 1975 and 1978, co-drove with Tony Longhurst in a BMW M3 Evolution. Cecotto almost didn't get to drive in the race after he crashed the car at Forrest's Elbow in the race morning warm up session, though the TAFE crash repair crew were able to repair the car for the start. Longhurst and Cecotto would finish in fourth place.

The 1992 Tooheys 1000 was also a sad occasion as popular veteran driver and 1967 Formula One world champion Denny Hulme, 56 years old from New Zealand and that country's only World Drivers' Champion, suffered a heart attack during lap 33. Hulme, driving the second Benson & Hedges Racing BMW M3 with young driver Paul Morris, started the race in 18th position. On lap 33 when the race was under heavy rain, Hulme radioed into his team while coming through Forrest's Elbow that he could not see. Coming down Conrod Straight, the yellow #20 BMW went off the track and glanced the wall on the left hand side before continuing across the track to the outside wall where the car came to a stop, Channel 7 cameras capturing the incident. Most concern was with the driver. While the race continued under the safety car, Hulme was removed from the car and taken by ambulance to nearby Bathurst Hospital where he was later pronounced dead from heart failure. According to unconfirmed reports, Hulme was still alive, though unconscious, when track marshals reached the BMW a few seconds after it came to a stop just before the right hand kink into Caltex Chase.

== Tooheys Top 10 ==
Pos	No	Team	Driver	Car	TT10	Qual
Pole	17	Shell Ultra-High Racing	(Australia) Dick Johnson	Ford Sierra RS500	2:12.898	2:14.56
2	11	Bob Jane T-Marts Perkins Racing	(Australia) Larry Perkins	Holden VL Commodore SS Group A SV	2:14.431	2:14.08
3	1	Winfield Team Nissan	(Australia) Mark Skaife	Nissan Skyline R32 GT-R	2:14.546	2:13.82
4	30	Peter Jackson Racing	(Australia) Glenn Seton	Ford EB Falcon	2:14.971	2:15.53
5	15	Holden Racing Team	(Australia) Tomas Mezera	Holden VP Commodore	2:16.028	2:15.74
6	4	GIO Racing	(Australia) Mark Gibbs	Nissan Skyline R32 GT-R	2:16.168	2:15.75
7	16	Holden Racing Team	(Australia) Allan Grice	Holden VP Commodore	2:16.215	2:16.13
8	05	Mobil 1 Racing	(Australia) Peter Brock	Holden VP Commodore	2:16.459	2:15.98
9	25	Benson & Hedges Racing	(Australia) Tony Longhurst	BMW M3 Evolution	2:16.932	2:15.26
10	10	Allan Moffat Enterprises	(Germany) Klaus Niedzwiedz	Ford Sierra RS500	2:16.943	2:14.98

* 1992 was the second and final time Dick Johnson claimed pole position at Bathurst. He had also been on pole in 1988. Johnson's time of 2:12.898 was almost one second faster than any other Sierra had ever been around the mountain and over 3 seconds faster than his shootout time from 1991. Johnson surprised many by driving in the shootout as it was Bowe who had set the cars fastest qualifying time. Unconfirmed rumours (denied by DJR) had the Sierra using a special qualifying engine putting out around 680 bhp (507 kW; 689 PS). 1992 was also Johnson's 15th straight appearance in the runoff meaning he had appeared in every runoff since it was first used in 1978.
* After only qualifying 11th in 1991, Tony Longhurst surprised in qualifying by putting his 2.5 L, 4 cyl BMW M3 Evolution into provisional 5th place. Longhurst admitted his lap was helped by getting a tow on the straights from Larry Perkins in his Holden Commodore. Without the benefit of the tow in the runoff, Longhurst dropped to 9th place
* Larry Perkins, the winner of the recent 1992 Sandown 500, also surprised by qualifying his older model VL Commodore in 2nd place in both official qualifying and the runoff. While many questioned the legality of the older model Commodore to go so fast, Perkins pointed out that he was only 8/10ths faster than he was in the same model in 1990 while the Sierra's (Johnson) had improved considerably more.
* Glenn Seton qualified his 1993 spec V8 Ford EB Falcon in 4th place, the fastest of the new cars. This put the Falcon on the second row of the grid one place behind what Dick Johnson attained in 1984, the previous time Ford Falcons had appeared in The Great Race.
* With a popoff valve allegedly limiting the power of the car to 450 bhp (336 kW; 456 PS), as well as an extra 140 kg of weight, Mark Skaife in his Nissan GT-R was almost two seconds slower than his 1991 pole time of 2:12.630, though this didn't stop him claiming provisional pole with a time of 2:13.82. Over 15 years later, team boss Fred Gibson admitted the GT-R's were actually running close to 600 bhp (447 kW; 608 PS).
* With four Commodores in the top 10, Holden had their best representation in the runoff during the Group A era of 1985–92, though this was still three short of the Commodore record of 7 cars under Group C rules in 1983. The two Holden Racing Team (HRT) cars, as well as Peter Brock's, were the new 1993 spec VP Commodores, all of which used a Small Block Chevrolet V8 engine. Larry Perkins' 1988 model Commodore used the Holden V8 engine. 1992 was also the first time that the HRT managed to get both team cars into the shootout.

== Official results ==
Pos	Class	No	Team	Drivers	Car	Laps	Qual Pos	Shootout Pos
1	A	1	Winfield Team Nissan	(Australia) Mark Skaife (New Zealand) Jim Richards	Nissan Skyline R32 GT-R	143	1	3
2	A	17	Shell Ultra-High Racing	(Australia) Dick Johnson (Australia) John Bowe	Ford Sierra RS500	143	3	1
3	A	2	Winfield Team Nissan	(Sweden) Anders Olofsson (Australia) Neil Crompton	Nissan Skyline R32 GT-R	143	11	
4	A	25	Benson & Hedges Racing	(Australia) Tony Longhurst (Venezuela) Johnny Cecotto	BMW M3 Evolution	142	5	9
5	C	16	Holden Racing Team	(United Kingdom) Win Percy (Australia) Allan Grice	Holden VP Commodore	141	10	7
6	A	4	GIO Racing	(Australia) Mark Gibbs (Australia) Rohan Onslow	Nissan Skyline R32 GT-R	138	8	6
7	A	55	Mobil 1 Racing	(Australia) Andrew Miedecke (Australia) Troy Dunstan	Holden VN Commodore SS Group A SV	137	16	
8	A	35	Peter Jackson Racing	(Australia) Wayne Park (Australia) David Parsons	Ford Sierra RS500	136	15	
9	A	11	Bob Jane T-Marts Perkins Racing	(Australia) Larry Perkins (Australia) Steve Harrington	Holden VL Commodore SS Group A SV	135	2	2
10	A	41	Daily Planet Racing	(Australia) Andrew Harris (Australia) Gary Cooke (Australia) John Trimbole	Holden VL Commodore SS Group A SV	135	24	
11	A	18	Shell Ultra-High Racing	(Australia) Terry Shiel (Australia) Greg Crick (Australia) Cameron McConville	Ford Sierra RS500	134	17	
12	A	6	Alf Grant	(Australia) Alf Grant (Australia) Tim Grant	Nissan Skyline HR31 GTS-R	134	27	
13	A	27	Terry Finnigan	(Australia) Terry Finnigan (Australia) Garry Rogers	Holden VN Commodore SS Group A SV	133	19	
14	A	28	Playscape Racing	(Australia) Kevin Waldock (Australia) Brett Peters	Ford Sierra RS500	132	20	
15	C	15	Holden Racing Team	(Australia) Tomas Mezera (Australia) Brad Jones	Holden VP Commodore	131	7	5
16	A	14	Warren Jonsson	(Australia) Warren Jonsson (Australia) Des Wall	Holden VL Commodore SS Group A SV	130	28	
17	A	34	Ray Gulson	(Australia) Ray Gulson (Australia) Graham Gulson (New Zealand) Peter Beck	BMW 635 CSi	129	33	
18	A	39	Everlast Battery Service	(Australia) Bill O'Brien (Australia) Barry Graham (Australia) Brian Callaghan Jr	Holden VL Commodore SS Group A SV	129	23	
19	A	10	Allan Moffat Enterprises	(Germany) Klaus Niedzwiedz (Australia) Gregg Hansford	Ford Sierra RS500	128	4	10
20	A	13	Ampol Max 3 Racing	(Australia) Bob Jones (New Zealand) Peter Janson	Holden VL Commodore SS Group A SV	128	25	
21	A	44	Stuart McColl	(Australia) Stuart McColl (Australia) Peter Gazzard	Holden VL Commodore SS Group A SV	126	30	
22	B	71	Toyota Team Australia	(Australia) Jason Bargwanna (Australia) Scott Bargwanna	Toyota Corolla FX-GT	126	39	
23	B	74	Peter Verheyen	(Australia) Peter Verheyen (Australia) Geoff Full	Toyota Sprinter	125	40	
24	B	70	Toyota Team Australia	(Australia) Neal Bates (Australia) Rick Bates	Toyota Corolla FX-GT	125	38	
25	A	9	Allan Moffat Enterprises	(Australia) Charlie O'Brien (Australia) Gary Brabham	Ford Sierra RS500	124	13	
26	A	42	Bob Forbes Racing	(Australia) Graham Moore (Australia) Wayne Gardner	Holden VN Commodore SS Group A SV	119	21	
27	C	05	Mobil 1 Racing	(Australia) Peter Brock (Germany) Manuel Reuter	Holden VP Commodore	118	9	8
28	B	72	Adrian Brooke	(Australia) Gregg Easton (Australia) Brad Stratton (Australia) David Sala	Toyota Sprinter	115	41	
29	B	78	Bob Holden Motors	(Australia) Ted Dunford (Australia) Brad Wright	Toyota Corolla	113	44	
30	B	76	Mountain Motorsport	(Australia) Mike Conway (Australia) Calvin Gardiner (Australia) Geoff Forshaw	Toyota Sprinter	112	42	
31	B	82	Stuart Murphy	(Australia) Stuart Murphy (Australia) Chris Barns	Toyota Corolla AE92	110	46	
NC	B	77	Malcolm Rea	(Australia) Malcolm Rea (Australia) Ken Talbert (Australia) Richard Wilson	Toyota Sprinter	104	47	
NC	A	36	Mike Newton	(Australia) Ken Mathews (Australia) Rod Jones (United Kingdom) Mike Newton	Ford Sierra RS500	101	37	
NC	B	75	Frank Binding	(Australia) Frank Binding (Australia) Bob Tindall	Toyota Corolla	96	45	
DNF	A	37	Roger Alexander	(Australia) John Bourke (Australia) Keith Carling	Toyota Supra Turbo	94	29	
NC	A	26	Daryl Hendrick	(Australia) Daryl Hendrick (Australia) John Blanchard	Holden VL Commodore SS Group A SV	94	34	
DNF	C	30	Peter Jackson Racing	(Australia) Glenn Seton (Australia) Alan Jones	Ford EB Falcon	84	6	4
NC	A	31	Ampol Max 3 Racing	(New Zealand) Robbi Ker (Australia) Don Watson	Holden VL Commodore SS Group A SV	81	36	
DNF	A	52	M3 Motorsport	(Australia) Peter Doulman (Australia) John Cotter	BMW M3	80	31	
DNF	B	73	Bob Holden Motors	(Australia) Bob Holden (Australia) Dennis Rogers (Australia) Garry Jones	Toyota Sprinter	68	43	
DNF	A	3	Lansvale Smash Repairs	(Australia) Steve Reed (Australia) Trevor Ashby	Holden VN Commodore SS Group A SV	65	14	
DNF	A	7	Caltex CXT Racing Team	(Australia) Peter Hopwood (Australia) Terry Bosnjak	Ford Sierra RS500	54	22	
DNF	A	29	Wayne Douglass Racing	(Australia) John English (New Zealand) Ed Lamont	Holden VL Commodore SS Group A SV	49	32	
DNF	A	20	Benson & Hedges Racing	(New Zealand) Denny Hulme (Australia) Paul Morris	BMW M3 Evolution	32	18	
DNF	A	40	John Leeson	(Australia) Garry Willmington (Australia) Tom Watkinson	Holden VL Commodore SS Group A SV	29	35	
DNF	A	50	Bryan Sala	(Australia) Bryan Sala (Australia) Kevin Weeks	Ford Sierra RS500	15	26	
DNF	A	8	Caltex CXT Racing Team	(Australia) Colin Bond (Australia) John Smith	Ford Sierra RS500	7	12	
DNS	A	22	Daily Planet Racing	(Australia) John Trimbole (Australia) Rohan Cooke	Holden VL Commodore SS Group A SV			
DNS	A	32	Peter Jackson Racing	(Australia) Glenn Seton (Australia) Alan Jones	Ford Sierra RS500			

== Statistics ==
- Provisional Pole Position - #1 Mark Skaife - 2:13.82
- Pole Position – #17 Dick Johnson – 2:12.898
- Fastest Lap – #1 Mark Skaife – 2:16.47 - Lap 114
- Average Speed – 138 km/h
- Race Time - 6:27:16.22

== See also ==
1992 Australian Touring Car season
