= 1993 Tooheys 1000 =

Motor race in Australia

Seasons
- ← 1992 1994 →

Layout of the Mount Panorama Circuit

The 1993 Tooheys 1000 was the 34th running of the Bathurst 1000 touring car race. It was held on 3 October 1993 at the Mount Panorama Circuit just outside Bathurst, New South Wales, Australia. The race was held for cars eligible under CAMS Group 3A Touring Car regulations, which included 5.0 litre V8 engined cars (that later became known as V8 Supercars), International Class II 2.0 litre Touring Cars (that later became known as Super Touring cars) and naturally aspirated two wheel drive cars complying with 1992 CAMS Group 3A regulations (which had been based on international Group A rules).

== Class structure and entry list ==
=== Class structure ===
Class A
Over 2000cc

The class later to become known as V8 Supercar.
It consisted of V8 Ford Falcons and Holden Commodores with a special dispensation to allow Group A 2.5 litre BMW M3s and a BMW 635CSi to race.

Class B
Up to 2000cc

The class later to become known as Super Touring.
It consisted of a pair of Toyota Corollas and a Toyota Carina and a group of older modified Group A touring cars, BMW M3s, Ford Sierras and Toyota Corollas.

=== Entry list ===
47 cars were entered in the race.

No.	Class	Drivers	Team (Sponsor)	Car	No.	Class	Drivers	Team (Sponsor)	Car
1	A	(Australia) Mark Skaife (New Zealand) Jim Richards	Gibson Motorsport (Winfield)	Holden Commodore VP	26	A	(Australia) Graham Lusty (Australia) John Lusty (Australia) Kevin Heffernan	Darrell Dixon Racing (Bretts Timber and Hardware Queensland)	Holden Commodore VL
2	A	(Australia) David Brabham (Sweden) Anders Olofsson	Gibson Motorsport (Winfield)	Holden Commodore VP	27	A	(Australia) Terry Finnigan (Australia) Garry Rogers	Terry Finnigan Racing Team (Foodtown Supermarkets)	Holden Commodore VP
3	A	(Australia) Steve Reed (Australia) Trevor Ashby	Lansvale Smash Repairs (Dulux ICI Autocolor)	Holden Commodore VP	28	A	(Australia) Kevin Waldock (Australia) Michael Preston (Australia) Brett Peters	Playscape Racing (Komatsu)	Ford Falcon EB
4	A	(Australia) Stuart McColl (Australia) Peter Gazzard	Bob Forbes Racing (GIO Insurance)	Holden Commodore VP	30	A	(Australia) Glenn Seton (Australia) Alan Jones	Glenn Seton Racing (Peter Jackson)	Ford Falcon EB
05	A	(Australia) Peter Brock (United Kingdom) John Cleland	Advantage Racing (Mobil 1)	Holden Commodore VP	33	A	(Australia) Bob Pearson (Australia) Phil Ward	Pro-Duct Motorsport (Pro-Duct Air Conditioning)	Holden Commodore VP
6	B	(Australia) Neal Bates (Australia) John Smith	Colin Bond Racing (Caltex)	Toyota Corolla Mk.6	34	A	(Australia) Bruce Stewart (Australia) Darren Stewart	Pro-Duct Motorsport (Pro-Duct Air Conditioning)	Holden Commodore VP
7	A	(Australia) Neil Crompton (Australia) Mark Gibbs	Bob Forbes Racing (GIO Insurance)	Holden Commodore VP	35	A	(Australia) Geoff Brabham (Australia) David Parsons	Glenn Seton Racing (Peter Jackson)	Ford Falcon EB
8	B	(Australia) Colin Bond (Australia) Terry Bosnjak	Colin Bond Racing (Caltex)	Toyota Corolla Mk.6	39	A	(Australia) Bill O'Brien (Australia) Brian Callaghan, Jr. (Australia) Barry Graham	O'Brien Automotive (Everlast Automotive)	Holden Commodore VL
10	A	(Australia) Charlie O'Brien (Australia) Andrew Miedecke	Allan Moffat Racing (Cenovis)	Ford Falcon EB	41	A	(Australia) Garry Willmington (Australia) Darren Pate (Australia) Tom Watkinson	Willmington Performance (Eagle Homes)	Ford Falcon EB
11	A	(Australia) Larry Perkins (Australia) Gregg Hansford	Perkins Engineering (Castrol)	Holden Commodore VP	43	A	(Australia) John Leeson (Australia) Steve Coulter (Australia) Greg Smith	John Leeson Racing (Boss Battery Chargers, Campbelltown Steering)	Holden Commodore VL
12	A	(Australia) Bob Jones (Australia) Greg Crick	Bob Jones Racing (Ampol Max 3)	Holden Commodore VP	44	A	(Australia) Ken Mathews (Australia) John Mathews (Australia) Tony Mulvihill	Lawless Racing (Northshore European Cars, Sydney 2000)	Holden Commodore VL
13	B	(Australia) Bob Holden^{1} (Australia) David Sala^{1} (Australia) Dennis Rogers	Bob Holden Motors (INJEC)	Toyota Corolla Mk.6	45	A	(Australia) Graham Gulson (Australia) Ray Gulson (Australia) Tania Gulson	Gulson Racing (Green's Foods)	BMW 635i E24
14	A	(Australia) Warren Jonsson (Australia) Des Wall	Jonsson Racing (Jonsson Racing)	Holden Commodore VL	47	A	(Australia) John Trimbole (Australia) Andrew Harris	Daily Planet Racing (Daily Planet)	Holden Commodore VL
15	A	(Australia) Tomas Mezera (United Kingdom) Win Percy	Holden Racing Team (Holden, Telecom MobileNet)	Holden Commodore VP	49	B	(Australia) Matthew Martin (Australia) Spencer Martin (New Zealand) David McMillan	Bob Holden Motors (McGuigan Brothers Wines)	Toyota Corolla Mk.6
16	A	(Australia) Brad Jones (Australia) Wayne Gardner	Holden Racing Team (Holden, Telecom MobileNet)	Holden Commodore VP	50	B	(Australia) Steve Masterton (Australia) Peter Hills	Knight Racing (Masterton Homes)	Ford Sierra
17	A	(Australia) Dick Johnson (Australia) John Bowe	Dick Johnson Racing (Shell)	Ford Falcon EB	52	B	(Australia) Peter Doulman (Australia) John Cotter	Doulman Automotive (Clark Sinks)	BMW M3 E30
18	A	(New Zealand) Paul Radisich (Australia) Cameron McConville	Dick Johnson Racing (Shell)	Ford Falcon EB	55	A	(Australia) Steve Harrington (Australia) Troy Dunstan	Advantage Racing (Quix Food Stores, Pepsi)	Holden Commodore VP
19	A	(Australia) Glenn Mason (Australia) Richard Wilson (Australia) Gregg McShane	Glenn Mason Racing (Street Heat Magazine)	Holden Commodore VL	66	B	(Australia) Gregg Easton (Australia) Kurt Kratzmann	Malcolm Rea Racing (Redline Lubricants)	Toyota Corolla Mk.7
20	A	(United Kingdom) Jeff Allam (Australia) John Blanchard	LoGaMo Racing (Benson & Hedges)	BMW M3 E30	72	B	(Australia) Brad Stratton (Australia) Chris Madden	Brad Stratton Motorsport (AVP Performance Engineering)	Toyota Corolla Mk.6
21	A	(Australia) Laurie Donaher (Australia) Mick Donaher	Donaher Racing (Mocopan Coffee)	Holden Commodore VL	75	B	(Australia) Frank Binding (Australia) Frank Dartell	Binding Smash Repairs (Binding Smash Repairs, Mosman Toyota)	Toyota Corolla Mk.6
22	A	(Australia) John English (Australia) Brett Youlden	Wayne Douglass Racing (Marathon Foods, Dru Truss)	Holden Commodore VL	77	B	(Australia) Steve Ellery (Australia) Garry Gosatti	Phoenix Motorsport (Chelgrave Contracting)	Ford Sierra
23	A	(Australia) Paul Morris (Germany) Joachim Winkelhock	LoGaMo Racing (Diet Coke)	BMW M3 E30	79	B	(Australia) Mike Conway (Australia) Calvin Gardiner (Australia) Gavin Monaghan	Conway Racing (Cadillac Films, Tanduay Rum)	Toyota Corolla Mk.7
24	A	(Australia) Geoff Full (Australia) Peter Fitzgerald	LoGaMo Racing (Diet Coke)	BMW M3 E30	99	B	(Australia) Steve Cramp (Australia) Dennis Cribbin	Malcolm Rea Racing (Redline Lubricants)	Toyota Corolla Mk.7
25	A	(Australia) Tony Longhurst (United Kingdom) Steve Soper	LoGaMo Racing (Benson & Hedges)	BMW M3 E30					

Icon	Class
A	Class A
B	Class B

- ^1 – Bob Holden and David Sala withdrew separately from Car #13 prior to the race. Sala was replaced with Peter Hopwood.

== Results ==
=== Top 10 shootout ===
Pos	No	Team	Driver	Car	TT10	Qual
Pole	11	Castrol Perkins Racing	(Australia) Larry Perkins	Holden VP Commodore	2:13.013	2:12.86
2	1	Winfield Racing Team	(Australia) Mark Skaife	Holden VP Commodore	2:13.573	2:13.06
3	15	Holden Racing Team	(Australia) Tomas Mezera	Holden VP Commodore	2:14.450	2:14.06
4	16	Holden Racing Team	(Australia) Wayne Gardner	Holden VP Commodore	2:14.903	2:14.31
5	17	Shell Racing	(Australia) Dick Johnson	Ford EB Falcon	2:15.386	2:14.76
6	30	Peter Jackson Racing	(Australia) Glenn Seton	Ford EB Falcon	2:15.459	2:14.37
7	05	Mobil 1 Racing	(Australia) Peter Brock	Holden VP Commodore	2:16.251	2:14.42
8	2	Winfield Racing Team	(Australia) David Brabham	Holden VP Commodore	2:16.308	2:15.82
9	18	Shell Racing	(New Zealand) Paul Radisich	Ford EB Falcon	2:16.545	2:14.96
10	7	GIO Racing	(Australia) Neil Crompton	Holden VP Commodore	2:29.902	2:14.98

* Larry Perkins was the only Commodore driver in the runoff to actually have a Holden V8 engine in his car. The rest of the Holden runners had the 5.0L Chevrolet engine in their cars.
* David Brabham became the first second generation driver to compete in the runoff, emulating his triple Formula One World Championship winning father Jack who drove in the inaugural Top 10 runoff in 1978. By coincidence, both finished their respective runoffs in 8th position. The younger Brabham also became the 6th ex-F1 driver to qualify for the runoff following Jack Brabham, Derek Bell, Larry Perkins, Johnny Cecotto and Alan Jones.
* After the Ford EB Falcons had dominated the first six rounds of the ATCC, CAMS allowed a new aero package for the Holden VP Commodores. At Bathurst this allowed the Commodore runners to qualify almost 3 seconds faster than they had in 1992 while the fastest Ford driver in official qualifying Glenn Seton (the only Falcon runner in 1992) could only improve his 1992 time by 1.2 seconds.
* The first driver to run against the clock, Neil Crompton, spun on oil coming into Caltex Chase on his fast lap. During his television interview upon returning to the pits, an angry Crompton said he was stunned to find oil flags waving going into the chase and questioned why the drivers were not told about the oil before the runoff started. As it happened, it was his own GIO Commodore that had been dropping the oil onto the track during both his warm up and official lap, causing grip problems for the next eight drivers to run. Only Perkins and a last out (due to an official mix-up) Dick Johnson said that they found none of the oil.

=== Race ===
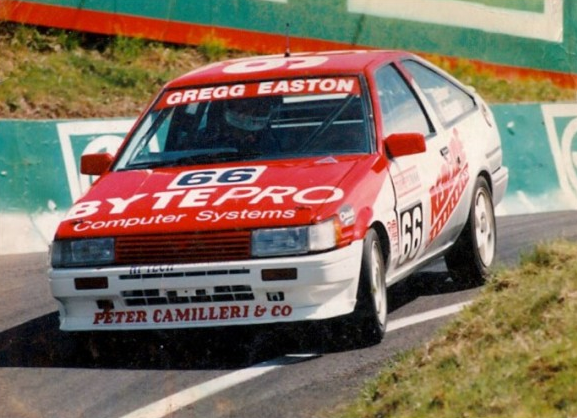
The Gregg Easton / Kurt Kratzmann Toyota Sprinter did not finish the race.

Pos	Class	No	Team	Drivers	Car	Laps	Qual Pos	Shootout Pos
1	A	11	Castrol Perkins Racing	(Australia) Larry Perkins (Australia) Gregg Hansford	Holden VP Commodore	161	1	1
2	A	1	Winfield Racing Team	(Australia) Mark Skaife (New Zealand) Jim Richards	Holden VP Commodore	161	2	2
3	A	16	Holden Racing Team	(Australia) Wayne Gardner (Australia) Brad Jones	Holden VP Commodore	160	4	4
4	A	2	Winfield Racing Team	(Australia) David Brabham (Sweden) Anders Olofsson	Holden VP Commodore	159	10	8
5	A	55	Pepsi Quix Racing	(Australia) Troy Dunstan (Australia) Steve Harrington	Holden VP Commodore	156	12	
6	A	35	Peter Jackson Racing	(Australia) Geoff Brabham (Australia) David Parsons	Ford EB Falcon	154	14	
7	A	12	Ampol Max 3 Racing	(Australia) Bob Jones (Australia) Greg Crick	Holden VP Commodore	153	15	
8	A	18	Shell Racing	(New Zealand) Paul Radisich (Australia) Cameron McConville	Ford EB Falcon	151	8	9
9	A	27	Terry Finnigan	(Australia) Terry Finnigan (Australia) Garry Rogers	Holden VP Commodore	150	20	
10	A	33	Pro-Duct Motorsport	(Australia) Bob Pearson (Australia) Bruce Stewart (Australia) Phil Ward	Holden VP Commodore	148	17	
11	A	20	Benson & Hedges Racing	(Australia) John Blanchard (United Kingdom) Jeff Allam	BMW M3 Evolution	148	24	
12	A	21	Laurie Donaher	(Australia) Laurie Donaher (Australia) Mick Donaher	Holden VL Commodore SS Group A SV	147	22	
13	A	14	Warren Jonsson	(Australia) Warren Jonsson (Australia) Des Wall	Holden VL Commodore SS Group A SV	146	27	
14	A	47	Daily Planet Racing	(Australia) John Trimbole (Australia) Andrew Harris	Holden VL Commodore SS Group A SV	146	28	
15	A	23	Diet Coke Racing	(Australia) Paul Morris (Germany) Joachim Winkelhock	BMW M3 Evolution	146	11	
16	A	28	Playscape Racing	(Australia) Mike Preston (Australia) Brett Peters (Australia) Kevin Waldock	Ford EB Falcon	145	19	
17	A	05	Mobil 1 Racing	(Australia) Peter Brock (United Kingdom) John Cleland	Holden VP Commodore	142	6	7
18	A	4	GIO Racing	(Australia) Stuart McColl (Australia) Peter Gazzard	Holden VP Commodore	140	23	
19	B	52	M3 Motorsport	(Australia) Peter Doulman (Australia) John Cotter	BMW M3	136	36	
20	A	26	Darrel Dixon	(Australia) Graham Lusty (Australia) Kevin Heffernan (Australia) John Lusty	Holden VL Commodore SS Group A SV	135	29	
21	A	22	Wayne Douglass Racing	(Australia) Brett Youlden (Australia) John English	Holden VL Commodore SS Group A SV	134	26	
22	B	13	Bob Holden Motors	(Australia) Dennis Rogers (Australia) Peter Hopwood (Australia) David Sala	Toyota Sprinter	128	44	
23	B	79	Cadillac Productions	(Australia) Mike Conway (Australia) Calvin Gardiner (Australia) Gavin Monaghan	Toyota Sprinter	127	38	
DNF	A	30	Peter Jackson Racing	(Australia) Glenn Seton (Australia) Alan Jones	Ford EB Falcon	147	5	6
DNF	A	7	GIO Racing	(Australia) Neil Crompton (Australia) Mark Gibbs	Holden VP Commodore	125	9	10
DNF	B	50	Knight Racing	(Australia) Steve Masteron (Australia) Peter Hills	Ford Sierra	122	45	
DNF	B	6	Caltex CXT Racing Team	(Australia) John Smith (Australia) Neal Bates	Toyota Corolla Seca	113	33	
DNF	A	15	Holden Racing Team	(Australia) Tomas Mezera (United Kingdom) Win Percy	Holden VP Commodore	107	3	3
DNF	B	72	Brad Stratton	(Australia) Brad Stratton (Australia) Chris Madden	Toyota Corolla	100	41	
DNF	A	17	Shell Racing	(Australia) Dick Johnson (Australia) John Bowe	Ford EB Falcon	96	7	5
DNF	A	19	Lansvale Smash Repairs	(Australia) Glenn Mason (Australia) Richard Wilson (Australia) Gregg McShane	Holden VL Commodore SS Group A SV	93	34	
DNF	A	39	Bill O'Brien	(Australia) Bill O'Brien (Australia) Barry Graham (Australia) Brian Callaghan Jr	Holden VL Commodore SS Group A SV	81	25	
DNF	A	3	Lansvale Smash Repairs	(Australia) Steve Reed (Australia) Trevor Ashby	Holden VP Commodore	80	16	
DNF	A	25	Benson & Hedges Racing	(Australia) Tony Longhurst (United Kingdom) Steve Soper	BMW M3 Evolution	79	13	
NC	A	45	Ray Gulson	(Australia) Ray Gulson (Australia) Graham Gulson (Australia) Tania Gulson	BMW 635 CSi	70	31	
DNF	B	8	Caltex CXT Racing Team	(Australia) Colin Bond (Australia) Terry Bosnjak	Toyota Corolla Seca	64	35	
DNF	B	77	Phoenix Motorsport	(Australia) Steven Ellery (Australia) Gary Gosatti	Ford Sierra	62	37	
DNF	B	99	Malcolm Rea	(Australia) Steve Cramp (Australia) Dennis Cribbin	Toyota Sprinter	57	43	
DNF	A	24	Diet Coke Racing	(Australia) Geoff Full (Australia) Peter Fitzgerald	BMW M3 Evolution	53	21	
DNF	B	75	Frank Binding	(Australia) Frank Binding (Australia) Frank Dartell	Toyota Corolla	52	39	
DNF	B	49	Bob Holden Motors	(New Zealand) Dave McMillan (Australia) Matthew Martin (Australia) Spencer Martin	Toyota Corolla FX-GT	46	40	
DNF	A	10	Allan Moffat Enterprises	(Australia) Andrew Miedecke (Australia) Charlie O'Brien	Ford EB Falcon	41	18	
DNF	A	44	Stuart McColl	(Australia) Ken Mathews (Australia) Tony Mulvihill (Australia) John Mathews	Holden VL Commodore SS Group A SV	31	30	
DNF	A	41	Garry Willmington Performance	(Australia) Garry Willmington (Australia) Darren Pate (Australia) Tom Watkinson	Ford EB Falcon	29	32	
DNF	B	66	Malcolm Rea	(Australia) Gregg Easton (Australia) Kurt Kratzmann	Toyota Sprinter	8	42	
DNS	A	34	Pro-Duct Motorsport	(Australia) Bruce Stewart (Australia) Darren Stewart	Holden VP Commodore			
DNQ	A	43	John Leeson	(Australia) John Leeson (Australia) Steve Coulter (Australia) Greg Smith	Holden VL Commodore SS Group A SV			
DNA	B	88	Malcolm Rea	(Australia) Malcolm Rea (Australia) Ken Talbert (New Zealand) Chris Barns	Toyota Sprinter			

== Statistics ==
- Provisional Pole Position - #11 Larry Perkins - 2:12.86
- Pole Position – #11 Larry Perkins – 2:13.013
- Fastest Lap – #1 Mark Skaife – 2:14.803 (165.92 km/h) on lap 84
- Race time of winning car - 6:29:06.69
- Winners' Average Speed – 154.51 km/h

== Broadcast ==
Channel Seven broadcast the race. Richard Hay and Mark Oastler spent time in both the booth and pit lane as part of the broadcast.

Channel 7
Host: Sandy Roberts
Booth: Mike Raymond, Garry Wilkinson, Mark Oastler, Richard Hay, Doug Mulray
Pit-lane: Allan Grice, Andy Raymond, Johanna Griggs

== See also ==
1993 Australian Touring Car season
