= Mobil 1 Racing =

Mobil 1 Racing may refer to:

- Holden Dealer Team - Australian motorsport team that had Mobil as title sponsor from 1985 to 1990
- Advantage Racing - Australian motorsport team that had Mobil as title sponsor in 1992/93
- Walkinshaw Andretti United - Australian motorsport team that had Mobil as title sponsor at various times since 1994

See also Mobil 1#Sponsorships
