= Holden Commodore (VN) =

Australian full-size car

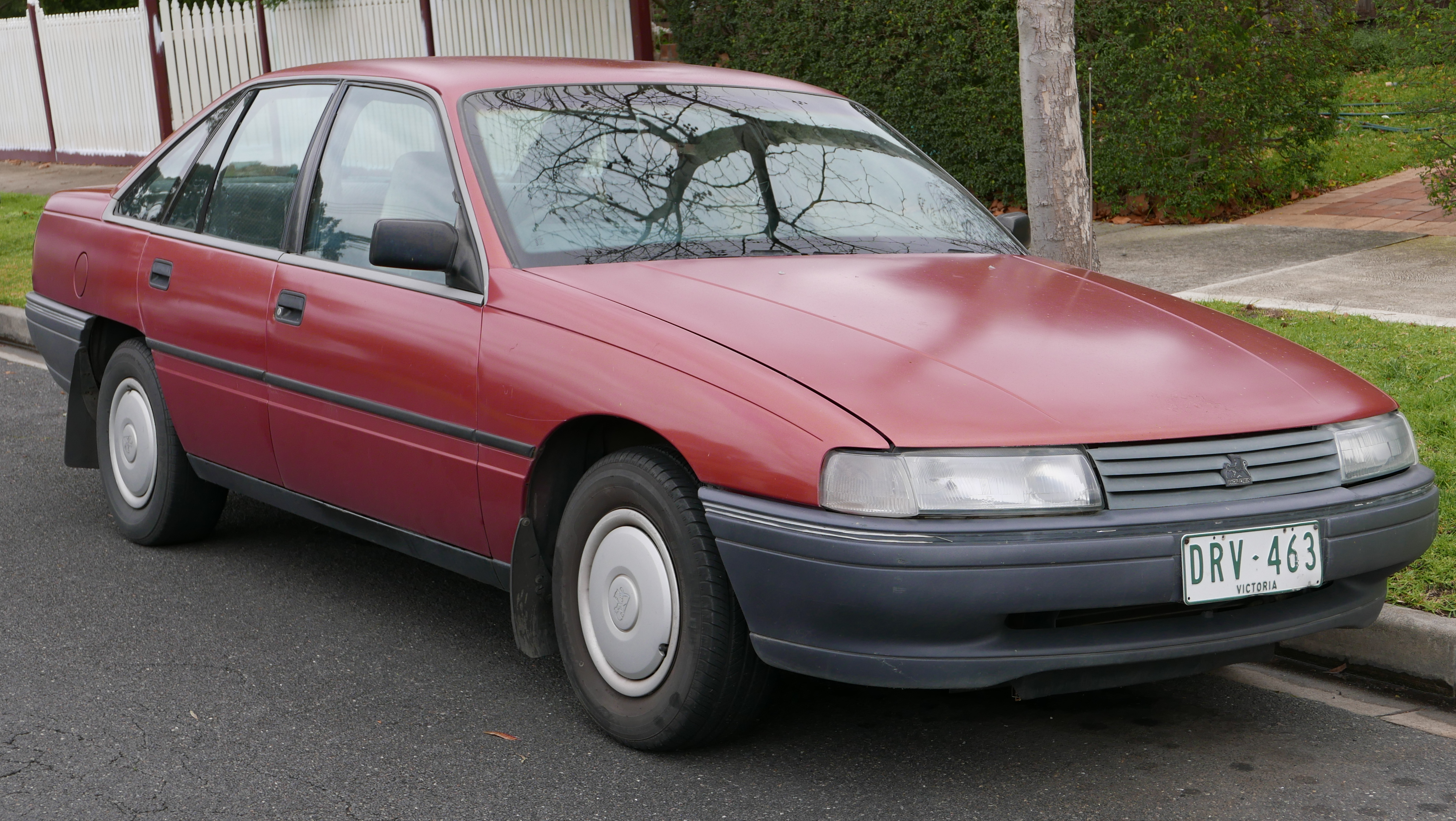
- 1989 Holden Commodore (VN) Executive sedan

Overview
- Manufacturer: Holden (General Motors)
- Also called: Toyota Lexcen (T1); Beijing BJ6490/6490D (China)
- Production: August 1988 – September 1991; 1997 (China)
- Assembly: Australia: Adelaide, South Australia (Elizabeth); New Zealand: Wellington (Trentham: 1988–1990)
- Designer: Phillip Zmood

Body and chassis
- Class: Full-size car
- Body style: 4-door sedan 5-door station wagon 2-door coupé utility (VG)
- Layout: Front-engine, rear-wheel-drive
- Platform: GM V platform
- Related: Holden Statesman/Caprice (VQ); Holden Utility (VG); Opel Omega; Opel Senator; Vauxhall Carlton; Vauxhall Senator

Powertrain
- Engine: gasoline: 2.0 L C20NE I4; 2.2 L I4 (China); 2.6 L C26NE Dual-Ram I6 (Thailand); 3.8 L 3800 V6; 5.0 L HEC 5000i V8
- Transmission: 5-speed Borg-Warner T-5 manual 4-speed GM HydraMatic 700 automatic

Dimensions
- Wheelbase: 2,731 mm (107.5 in)–2,822 mm (111.1 in)
- Length: 4,850 mm (191 in)–4,896 mm (192.8 in)
- Width: 1,794 mm (70.6 in)–1,802 mm (70.9 in)
- Height: 1,400 mm (55 in)–1,474 mm (58.0 in)
- Kerb weight: 1,311 kg (2,890 lb)–1,492 kg (3,289 lb)

Chronology
- Predecessor: Holden Commodore (VL); Toyota Crown (S120) (Lexcen)
- Successor: Holden Commodore (VP)

The Holden Commodore (VN) is a full-size car that was produced by Holden from 1988 to 1991. It was the first iteration of the second generation of this Australian made model, which was previously a mid-size car, as well as the first Commodore available as a coupé utility. The new range included the luxury variants, Holden Berlina (VN) and Holden Calais (VN) and, from 1990, introduced the commercial Holden Utility (VG).

== Overview ==
The VN series was released on 17 August 1988 and it was a re-engineered hybrid of the European Opel Omega and Opel Senator - and their corresponding Vauxhall sister models the Carlton II and Senator II. This donor body was paired to a Buick V6 engine or the Holden V8 engine. The project cost some A$200 million.

As well as being highly based on the Opel Senator, the VN also was similarly based on the Opel Omega, but this time, the previous VL Commodore floor pan was widened and stretched. The Commodore could now match the rival Ford Falcon for size. The VN Commodore was available in Executive, S, SS, Berlina and Calais specification levels. The VN Commodore was also awarded Wheels Car of the Year for a second time in 1988. For the first time since 1984, Holden again offered a commercial coupe utility with the first-Commodore based VG Utility sold from August 1990. The Holden Statesman and Caprice (VQ) models, which were introduced in March 1990, were also VN Commodore based, but shared a longer wheelbase with the VN Commodore wagon and VG Utility.

Changes in the relative values of the Australian dollar, the Japanese yen, alongside the US dollar made it impractical to continue with the well-regarded Nissan engine of the VL. Instead, Holden adopted and domestically manufactured their own variant of the Buick LN3 V6 which was adopted from US market GM vehicles, although initially it was imported. The 5.0-litre V8 remained optional and received a power boost to 165 kW (221 hp). Both these engines used multi point GM EFI and the V6 using 3 coil-packs for ignition. Although not known for its smoothness or quietness, the V6 was nevertheless praised for its performance at the time. A fuel-injected, 2.0-litre four-cylinder VN Commodore model was offered for some export markets including New Zealand and Singapore, which were sold as the Holden Berlina sharing an engine with the Opel Vectra A. Accompanying the changes to engines, the four-speed Jatco automatic transmission was replaced by the GM TH700 (also with four speeds) and the Borg-Warner T-5 five-speed manual gearbox.

A centre high-mount stoplight (CHMSL) was introduced prior to 1 July 1989 due to regulations in Australia requiring them to be fitted to all passenger cars manufactured from this date.

In September 1989, the Series II of the VN Commodore was released with the EV6 engine. Some of the changes included a new cast exhaust manifold, new camshaft sprocket profile and timing chain, improved air and fuel distribution to combustion chamber, recalibrated ignition and injector firing within the engine management computer, wider conrod bearings and revised throttle uptake. The automatic transmission was also recalibrated to match the new engines torque characteristics. These revisions helped reduce initial torque levels whilst also improving the noise and vibration levels of the V6 engine.

A total of 215,180 VN Commodores were manufactured during the model's 3-year lifespan, before production ended in September 1991.

=== Toyota Lexcen (T1) ===
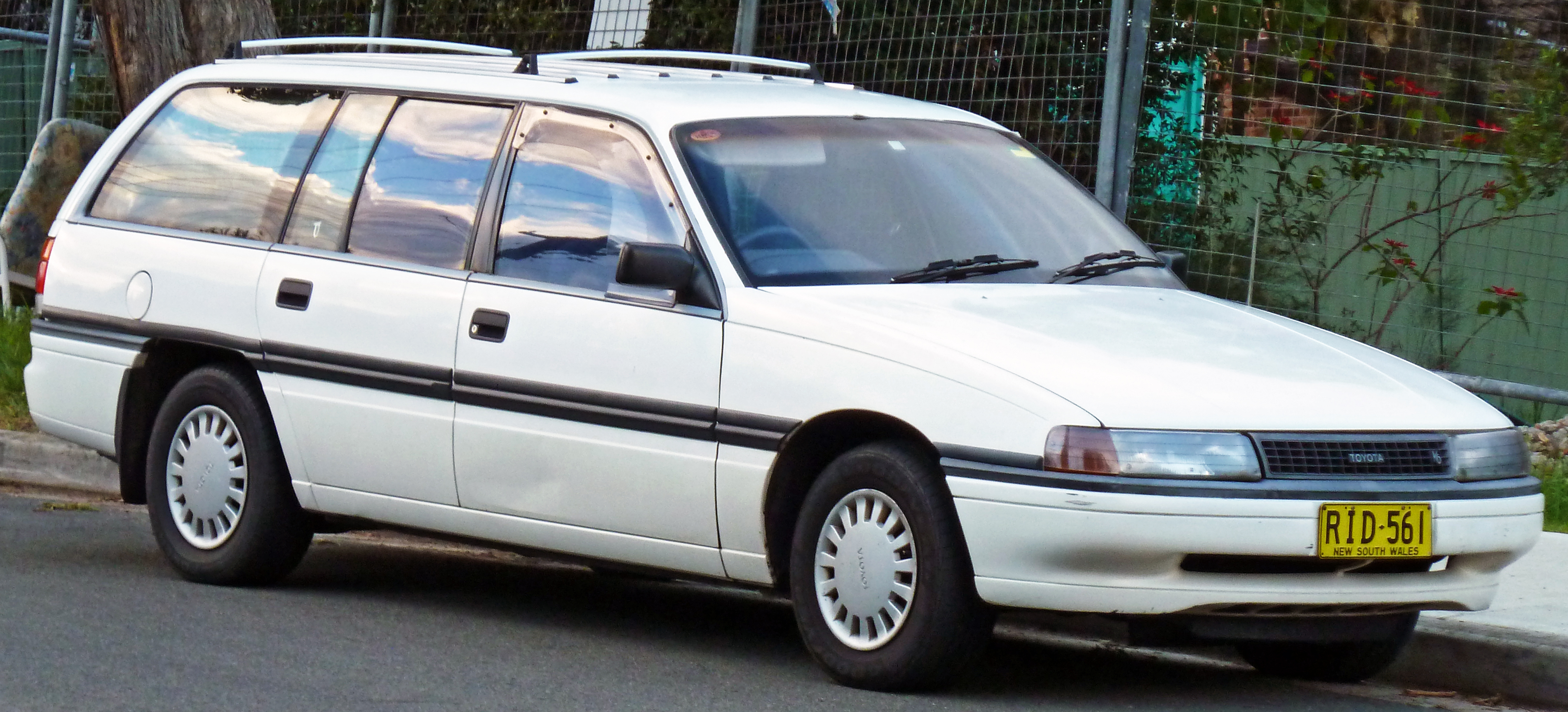
1989 Toyota Lexcen (T1) GL wagon

Under the Hawke Government's Button car plan, which saw a reduction in the number of models manufactured locally, and the introduction of model sharing, the VN Commodore was rebadged as the Toyota Lexcen, launched in September 1989, named after the late 1983 America's Cup yacht designer, Ben Lexcen and replaced the previous similar-sized Toyota Crown S120 offered in Australia. Subsequently, the Toyota Corolla and Camry were, similarly, badged as the Holden Nova and Holden Apollo.

=== New Zealand ===
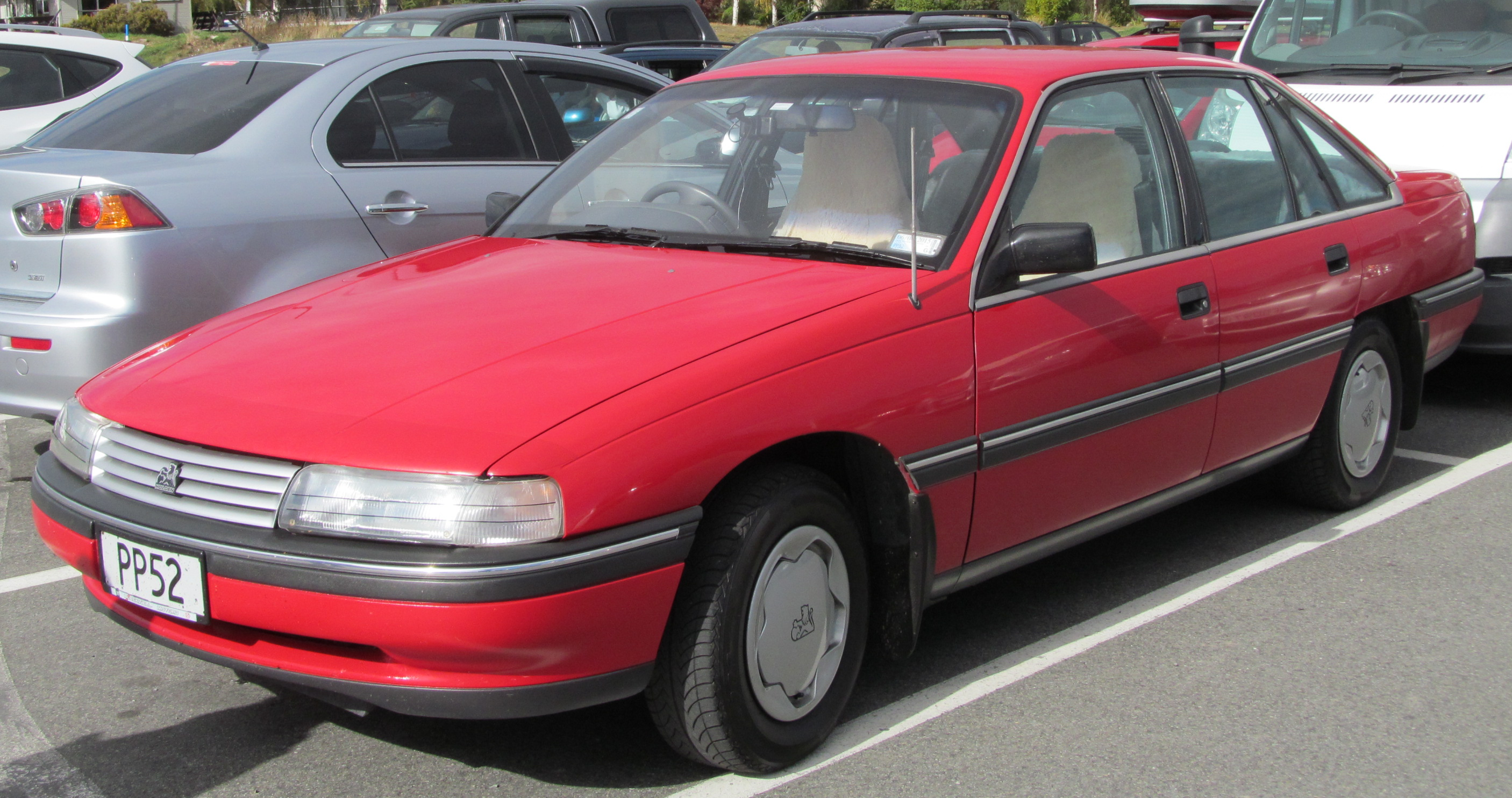
New Zealand specification Commodore Berlina, badged as Executive (1990–1991)

The VN series was assembled in New Zealand between 1988 and 1990. For the first few months of production it was actually assembled alongside its predecessor, the VL. This was due to the VL Commodore being slightly smaller, and offering a 2.0 L inline-six Nissan RB20E (for New Zealand only) or 3.0 L RB30E straight-six engine, also by Nissan.

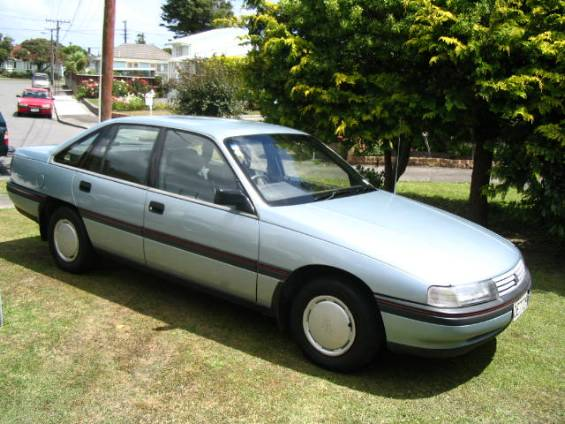
New Zealand specification Commodore Berlina, badged as Executive (1988–1990)

A unique situation of the New Zealand VN Commodore was its trim levels. Where in Australia, Berlina was of higher spec than Executive; in New Zealand the roles were actually reversed. Commodore Executive was the Australian Berlina spec, while Berlina – had a similar spec to the Australian Executive models – and utilised a 2.0-litre Family II 20SE four-cylinder engine.

The Berlina four-cylinder model was a unique car for New Zealand (as well as a few other export markets) and was unavailable to Australia. The four-cylinder Berlina was developed in Australia primarily for the New Zealand market, it was equipped with an unemissionised fuel-injected 2.0 L motor (tuned to run on 96 octane fuel), essentially that of the Opel Vectra A mounted north–south, driving the rear wheels. The Berlina was available in both sedan and wagon body styles.

The Calais models were also offered to New Zealand, primarily in V6 form. In fact, due to a cancelled Singapore order, twenty fully equipped VN Calais models were sold in New Zealand – utilizing the Berlina's four-cylinder motor. Additionally, it is believed that there are a few VN Calais wagons in existence in New Zealand.

An indigenous sports model, the Commodore GTS, was also offered to the New Zealand market during 1990. Based on the New Zealand Executive models, the GTS featured a 3.8 L V6 engine, manual or automatic transmission, bodykit (similar to that of the VN Commodore SS), alloys and FE2 suspension. It was a limited build, available in either White or Dark Blue.

The VN was the last Commodore to be assembled in New Zealand, after General Motors New Zealand closed its plant in Trentham in late 1990. The last locally assembled model was a 3.8-litre Commodore V6, which came off the assembly lines on 21 November of that year. Thereafter, Holden cars sold in New Zealand came fully built up from Australia, from where they could be imported duty-free under the Closer Economic Relations agreement.

=== China ===
In 1997 the Beijing BJ6490 was produced in China under the brand Beijing Travel Vehicle Works for 1997 only, built on a BAW BJ212 chassis, with authentic body parts shipped in from the Holden Elizabeth plant. Yuzhou General Auto Works also made a car based on a VN Commodore wagon, called the YZ6490. The BJ640 was powered by a 2.2 liter 4 cylinder engine and a hybrid version, the BJ6490D was shown at an Auto Show in 1998 and was priced at 140,000 yuan (US$20,180). The engine was supplied from the Sichuan Electric Motor Factory.

== Models ==
=== Commodore Executive ===
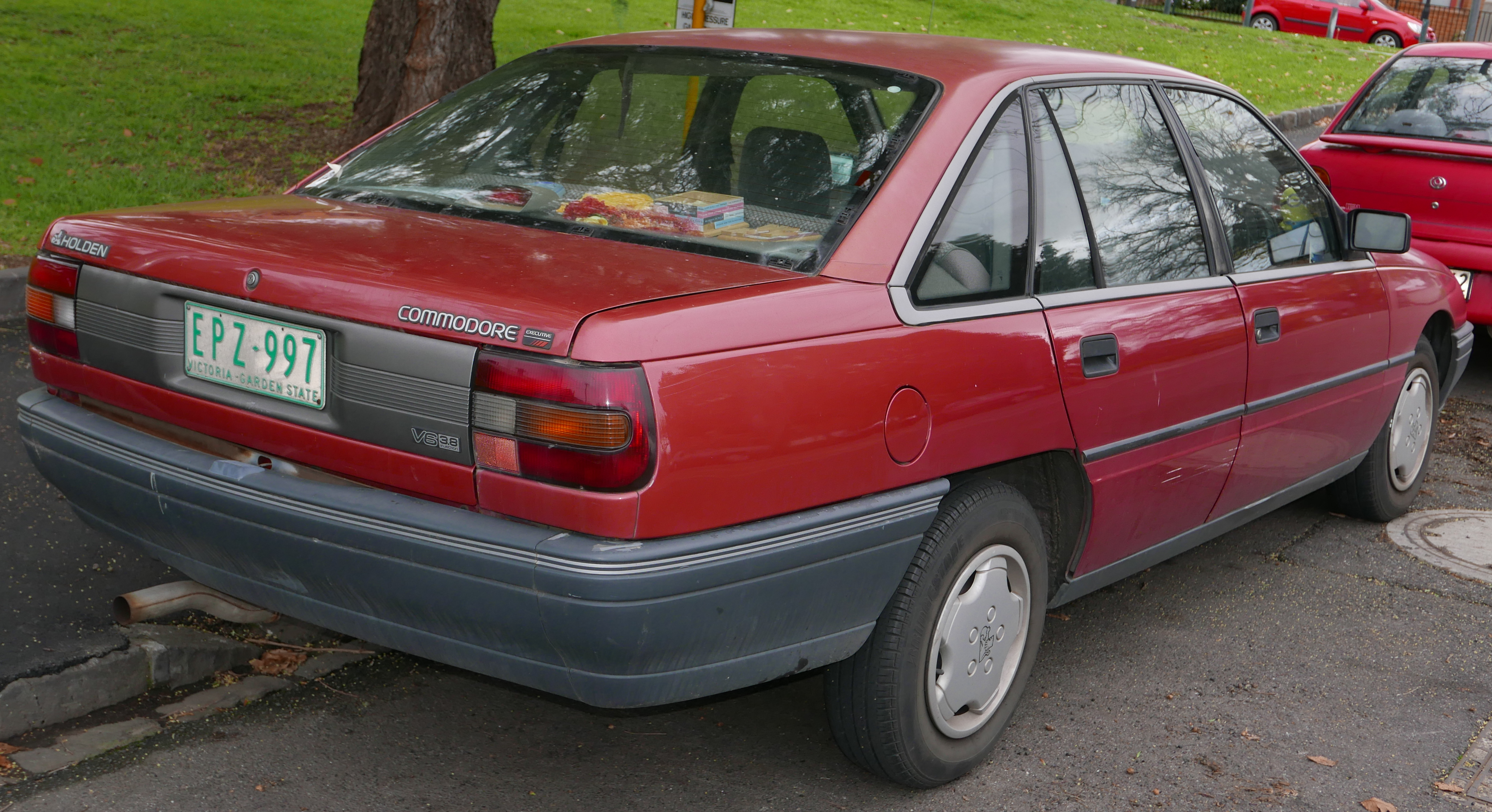
1990–1991 Holden Commodore Executive sedan

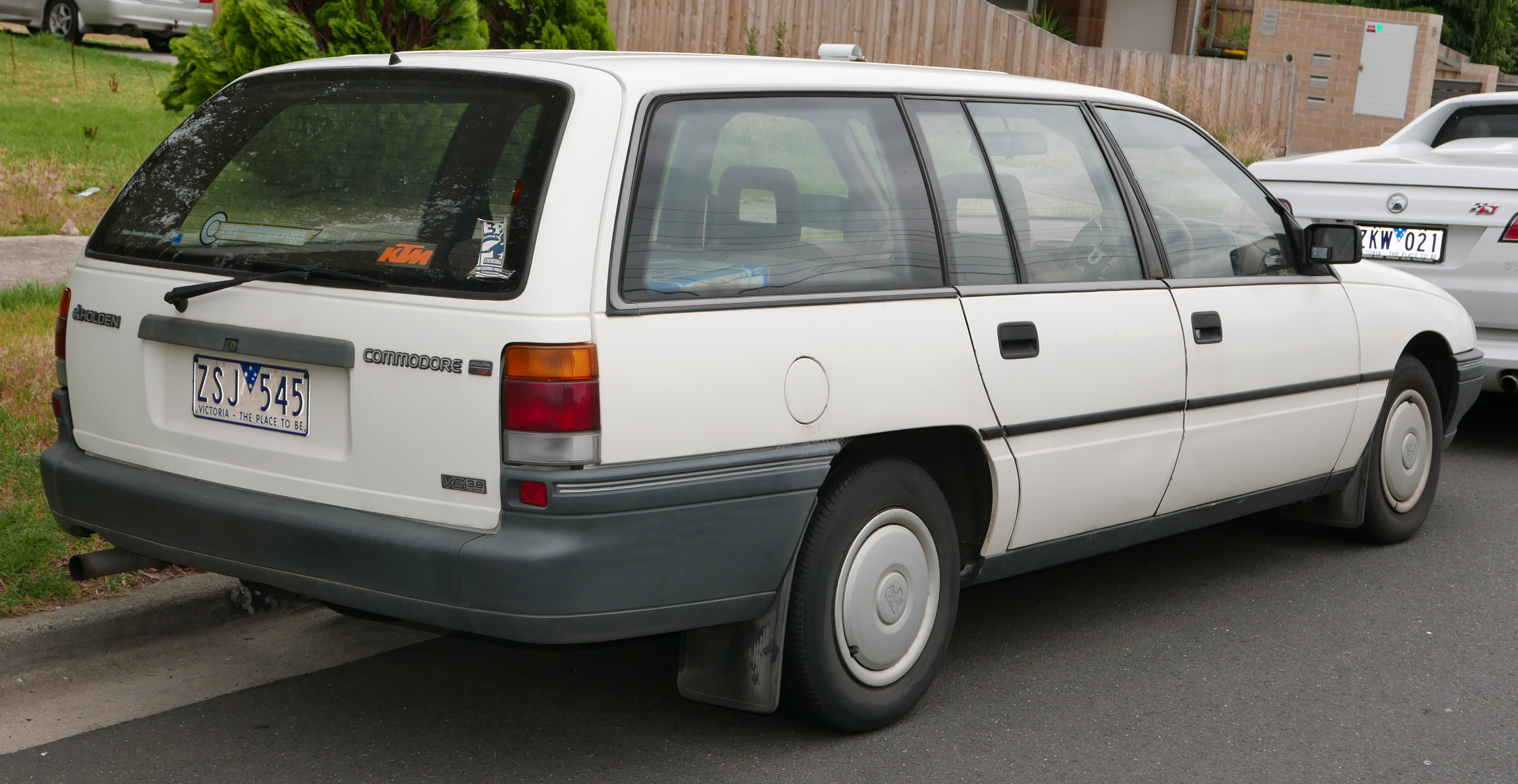
1988–1990 Holden Commodore Executive wagon

The Commodore Executive was the base model of the VN Commodore range and was priced from A$20,014 when new. Its standard features included:

- 3.8-litre 125 kW (168 hp) V6 engine
- 5-speed manual transmission
- Power steering
- Power-assisted disc brakes on all four wheels
- 14 inch steel wheels

Optionals included:

- 5.0 L 165 kW (221 hp) V8 engine
- 4-speed automatic transmission or
- 5-speed manual transmission
- Air conditioning
- Cruise control
- Holden Formula Bodykit
- 15 inch alloy wheels

=== Commodore S ===
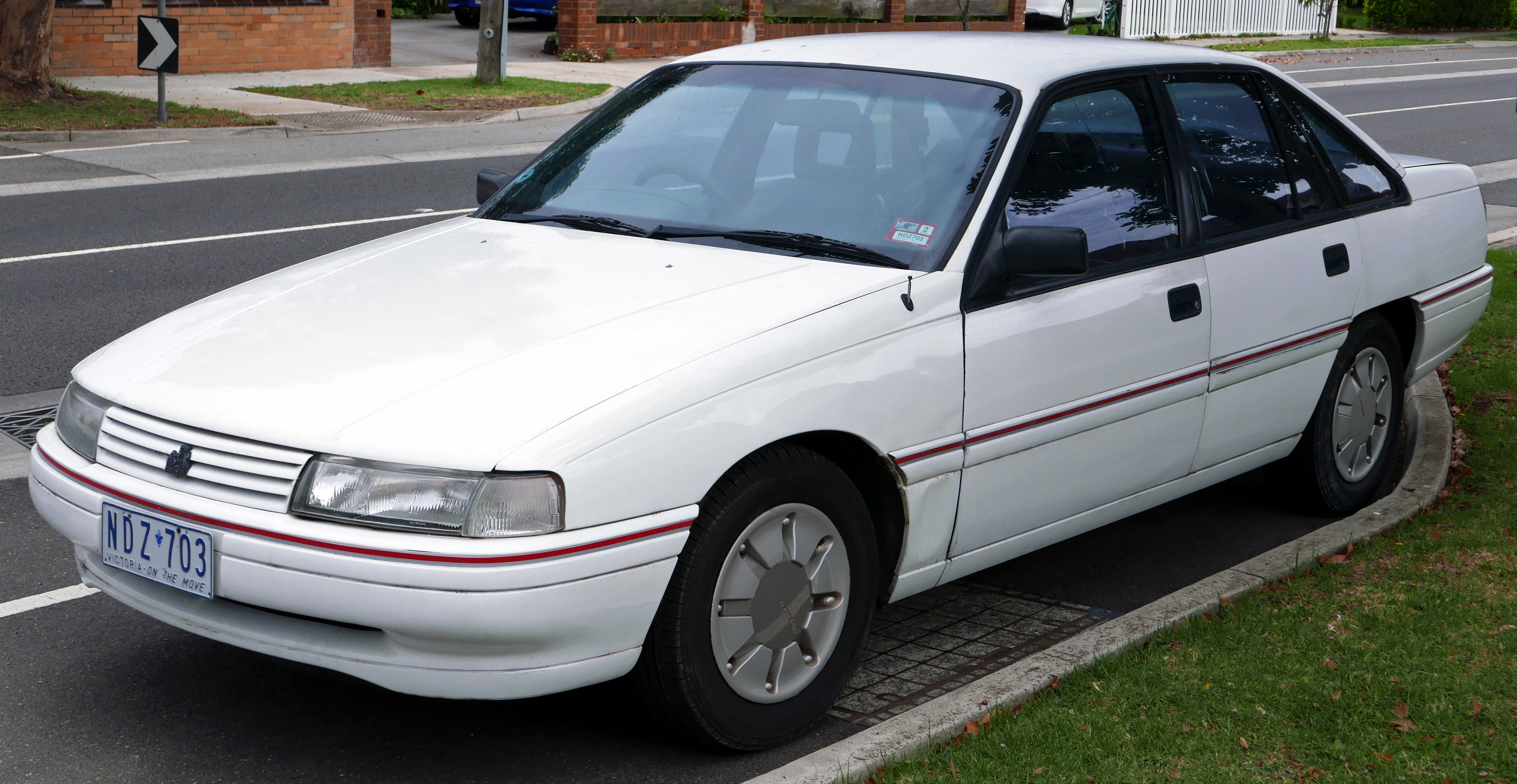
Holden Commodore S sedan

The VN Commodore S was the entry sports variant of the VN Commodore range and was priced from A$21,665 when new. Its features (in addition to or replacing those of the Executive) included:

- Basic bodykit
- Sports trim interior
- Sports badging & exterior striping
- FE2 Suspension

Optionals included:

- Air conditioning
- Cruise control
- Holden Formula Bodykit
- Optional Power Pack which incorporated:
  - Front and rear power windows
  - Power antenna
  - Power mirrors
- 15 inch alloy wheels (usually colour-coded)
- Metallic Paint

=== Commodore SS ===
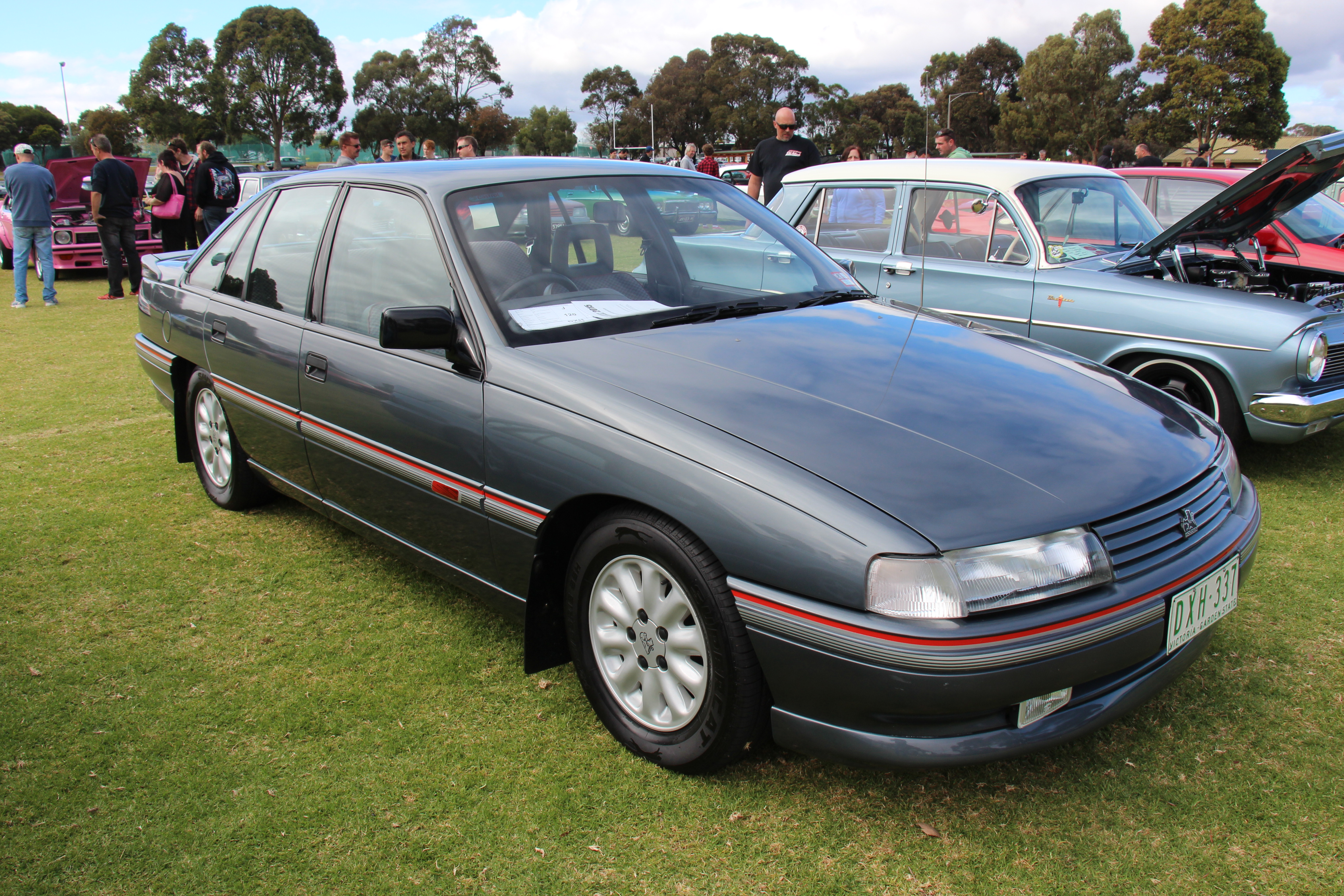
Holden Commodore SS sedan

The VN Commodore SS was released in March 1989 and was the top of the range sports model of the VN Commodore range and was priced from A$25,375 when new. Its features (in addition to or replacing those of the S model) included:

- 5.0-litre 165 kW (221 hp) V8 engine
- Limited-slip differential
- TH700 Automatic or T5 5-speed manual transmission
- Driving lights
- FE2 sports suspension
- Body kit including front & rear bumper lip, side skirts, boot lip spoiler
- SS decals and striping
- SS interior fabrics incorporating a grey/red checker design
- Unique SS alloy wheels

Optionals included:

- Air conditioning
- Holden Formula Bodykit
- Power Pack which incorporated:
  - Front and rear power windows
  - Power antenna
  - Power mirrors
  - Cruise control (Automatic only)

Colours available:

- Atlas Grey
- Phoenix Red
- Alpine White (available later in the VN lifespan).

=== Berlina ===
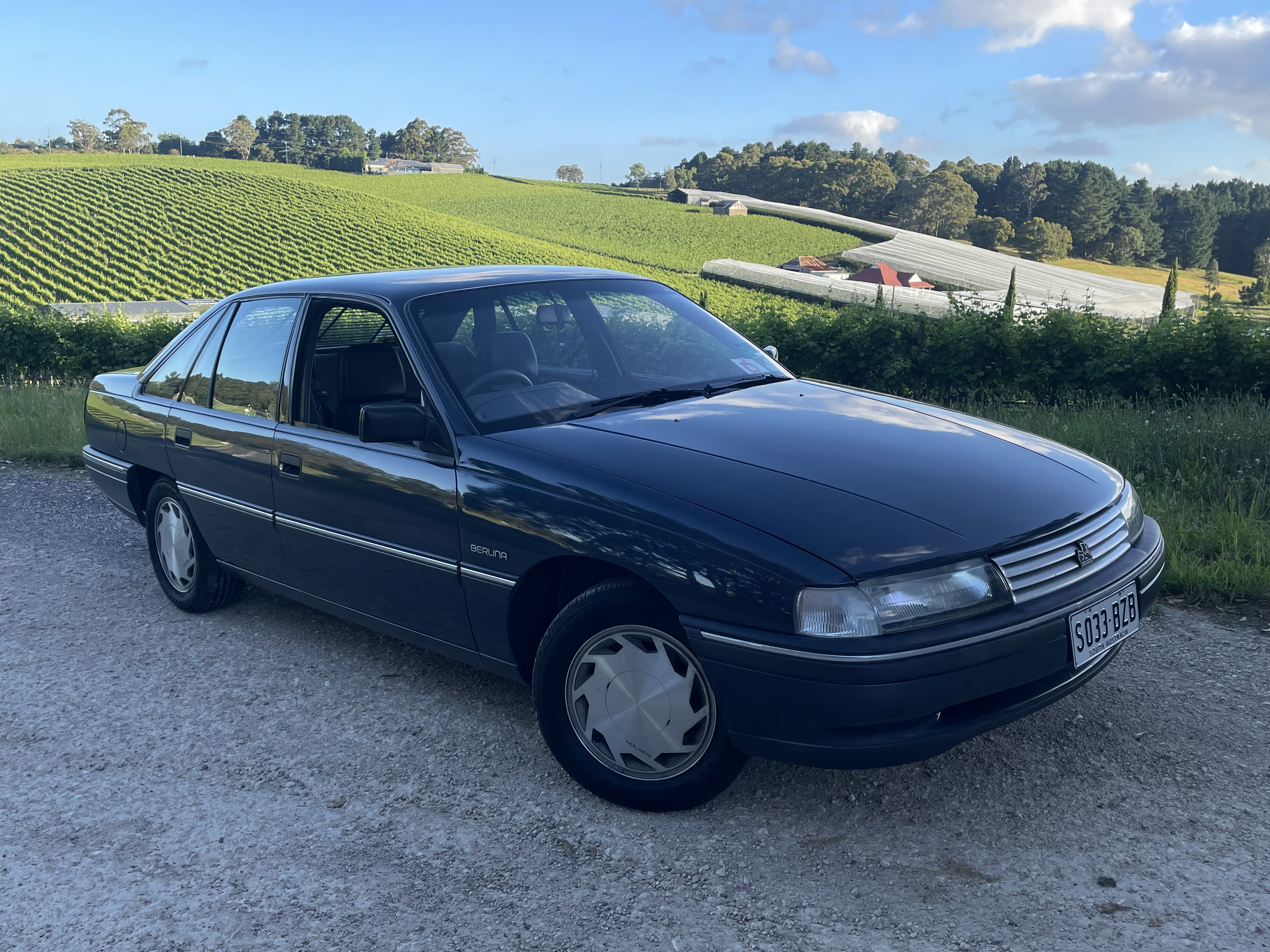
1990 VN Berlina 3.8 Auto (Front)

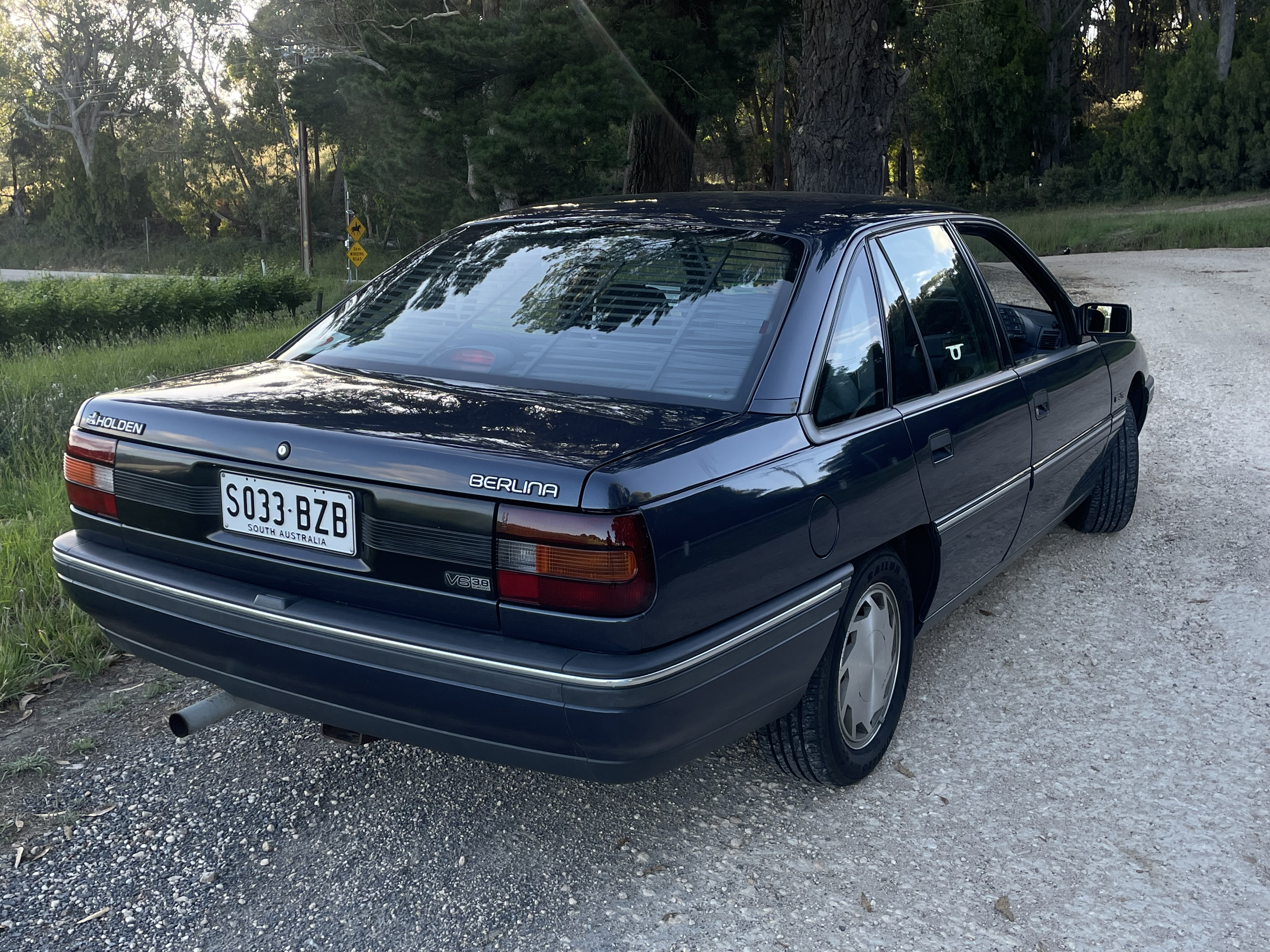
1990 VN Berlina 3.8 Auto (Rear)

The Berlina was the entry luxury version of the VN Commodore range and was priced from A$24,781 when new. Its features (in addition to or replacing those of the Executive) included:

- 4-speed automatic transmission
- Air conditioning

Optionals included:

- 5.0-litre 165 kW (221 hp) V8 engine
- 5-speed manual transmission
- Cruise control
- Holden Formula Bodykit
- Power Pack which incorporated:
  - Front and rear power windows
  - Power antenna
  - Power mirrors
- 15 inch alloy wheels

=== Calais ===
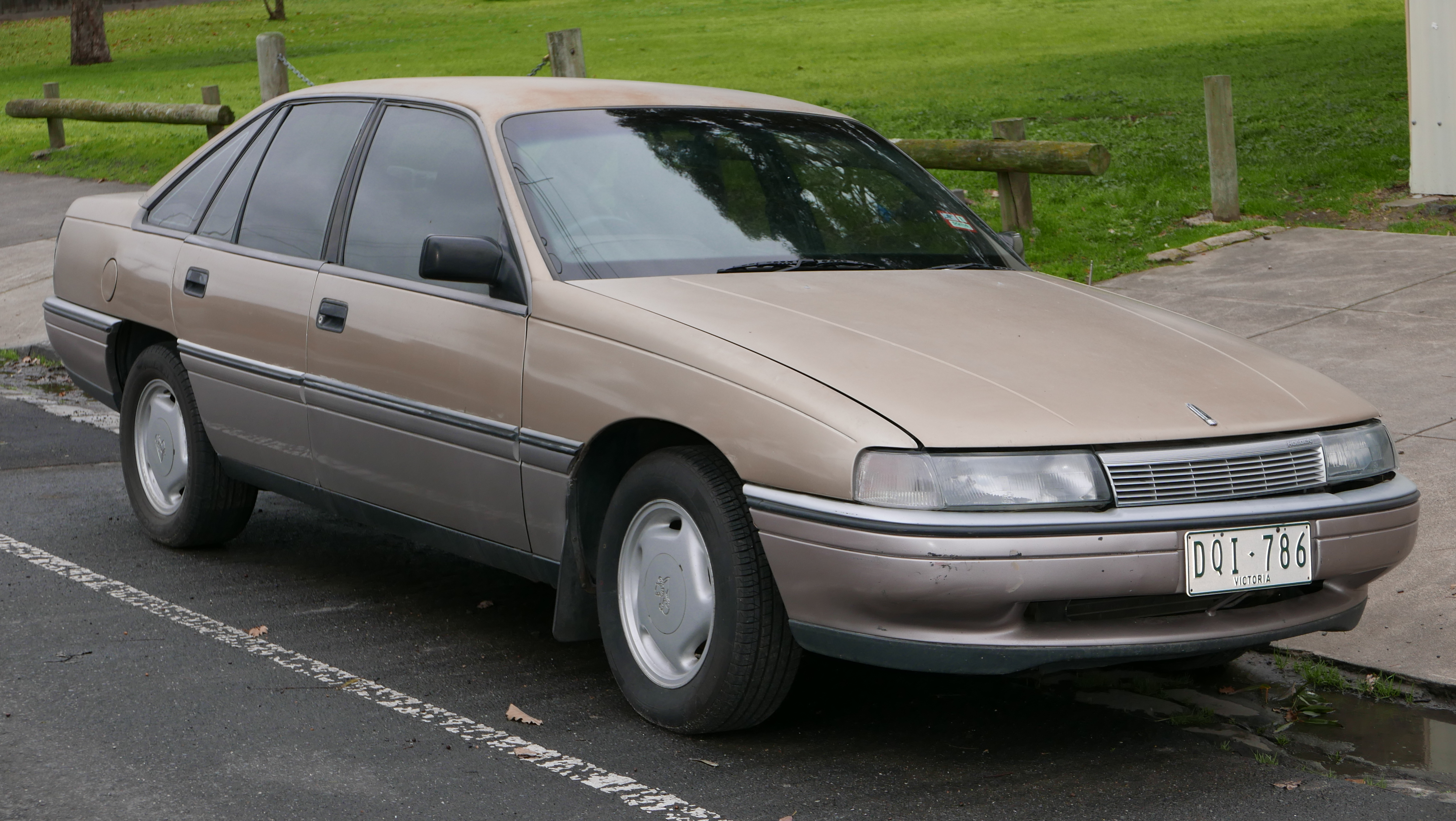
Holden Calais sedan

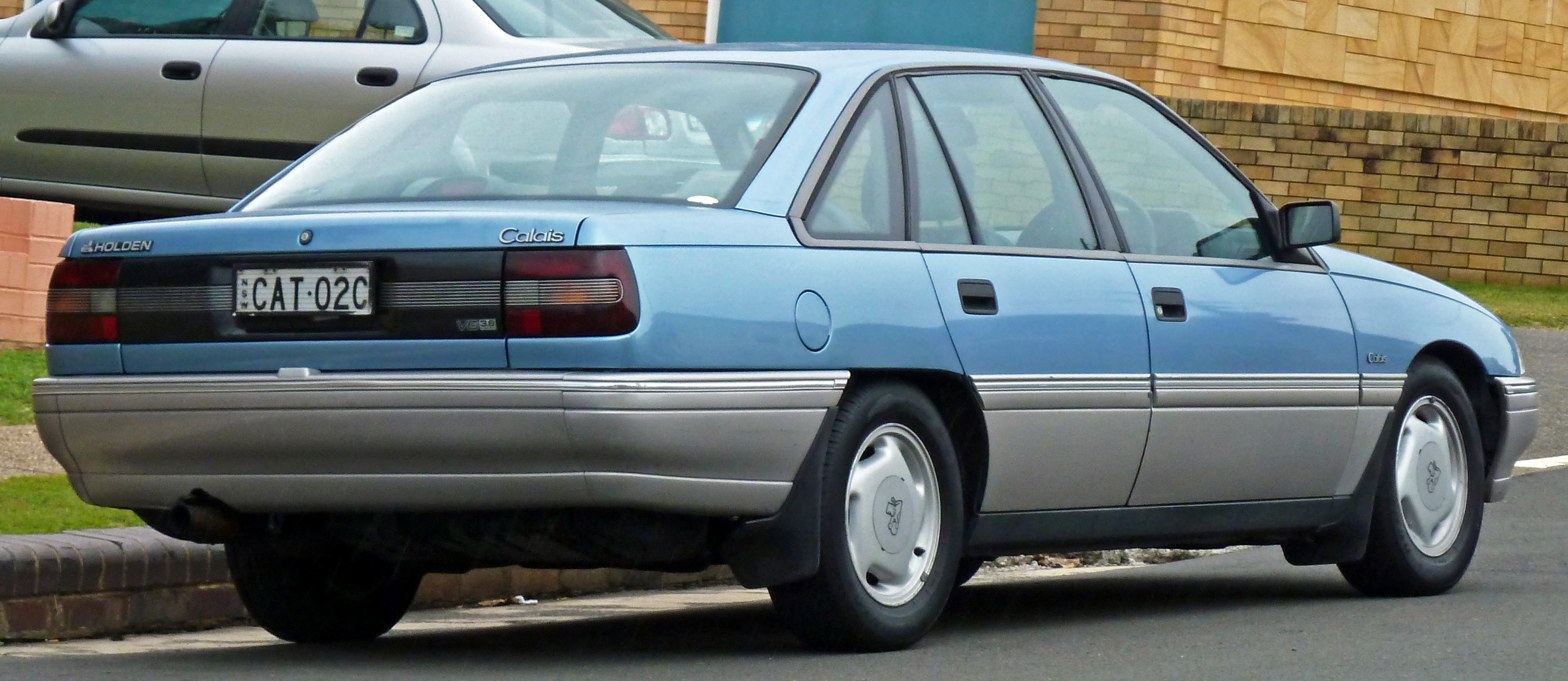
Holden Calais sedan

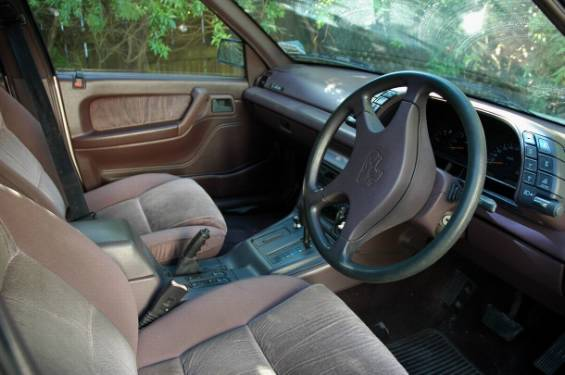
Calais interior

The Calais was the top of the range luxury version of the VN Commodore range and was priced from A$31,265 when new. Its features (in addition to or replacing those of the Berlina) included:

- Cruise control
- Power Pack which incorporated:
  - Front and rear power windows
  - Power antenna
  - Power mirrors
- 15 inch alloy wheels
- Computer-assisted trip/odometer
- Climate control (introduced in 1990)
- Remote central locking
- Alarm

Optionals included:

- 5.0-litre 165 kW (221 hp) V8 engine, incorporating LSD
- 5-speed manual transmission
- Country pack suspension
- Holden Formula Body kit
- Leather upholstery
- Limited-slip differential (LSD)
- Sports suspension
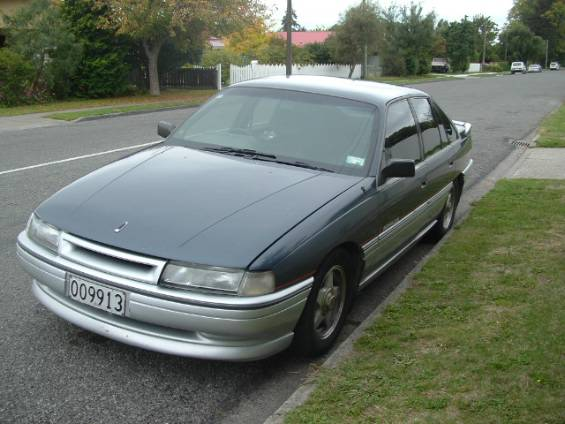
Holden Calais, with Formula body kit

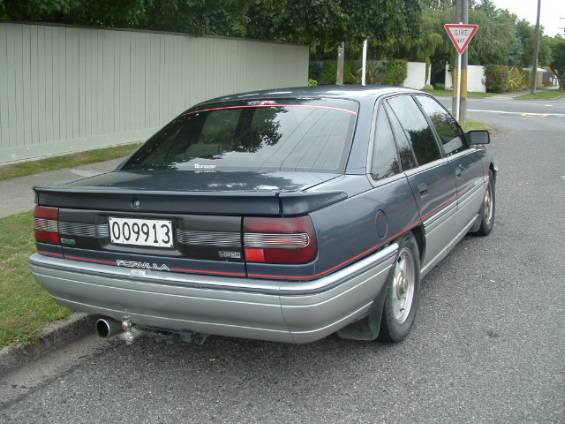
Holden Calais, with Formula body kit

== Limited edition and other specification levels ==
=== Commodore Vacationer ===
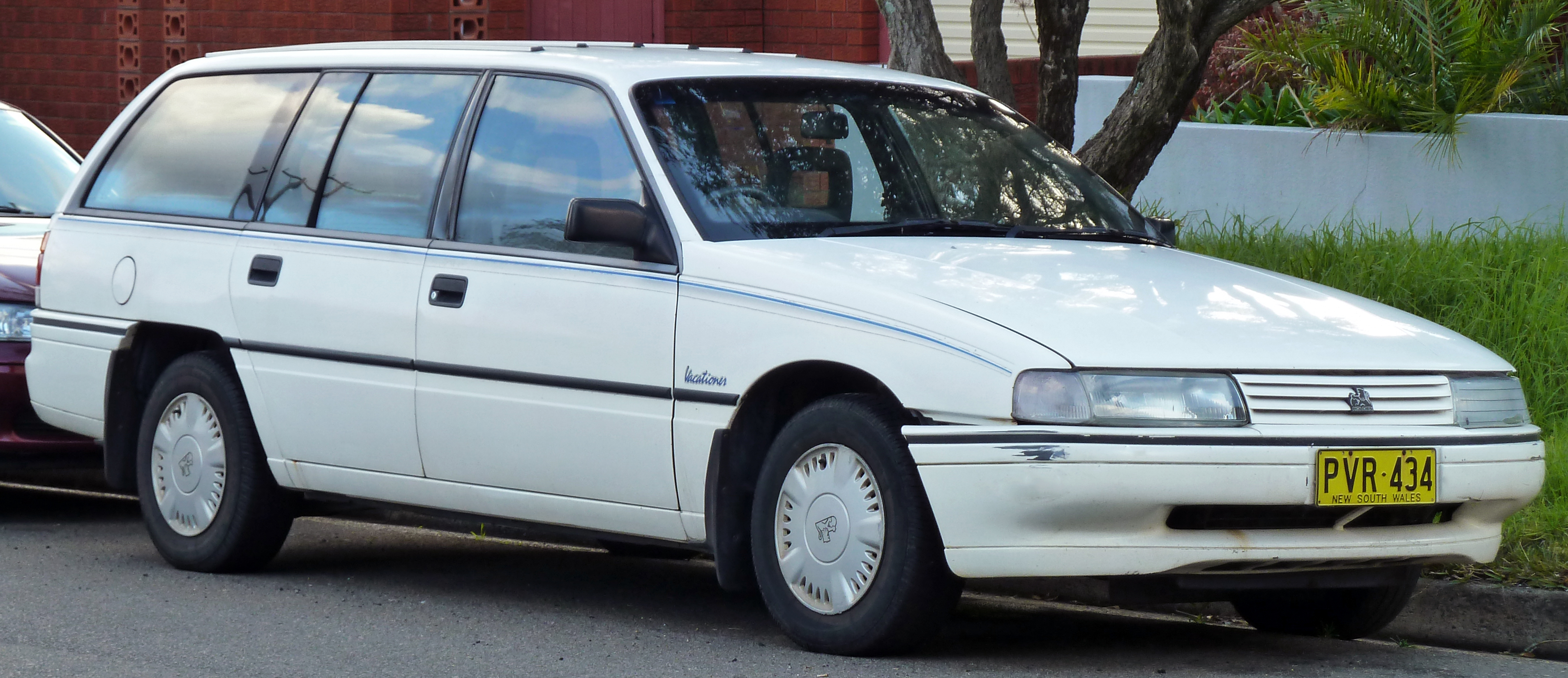
Commodore Vacationer

The 1990 Commodore Vacationer was a limited edition whose features complemented those of the donor Executive model and included:

- Special "Vacationer" badging
- Body coloured front and rear bumper and rocker panel (grey on Executive)
- Air conditioning
- Electric mirrors
- Tachometer
- Unique 14-inch wheel covers
- Two paint colours only—Alpine White or Azure Blue
- Commodore S seat trim (with red detail) minus driver's side lumbar support
- Optional 4-speed automatic transmission.

=== Commodore LE ===
This limited edition of 100 sedans with the 3.8-litre V6 engine was exclusively made available to the Holden dealer group of New South Wales, for sale at the Sydney Motor Show in October 1989 at a price of $43,200. Its production ended in January 1990. Production totalled 100 units.

Codenamed "8VK19 V6M", it was based on a Commodore S and was featured Sydney Opera House-inspired decals on the front guards as well as HSV add-ons that included a SV3800 body kit and Momo steering wheel. It was available only painted in Alpine White.

It was part of the long-running Sydney-only Opera House models.

An unrelated version, known only as LE, was released in April 1991 with a limited number of cars available nationwide.

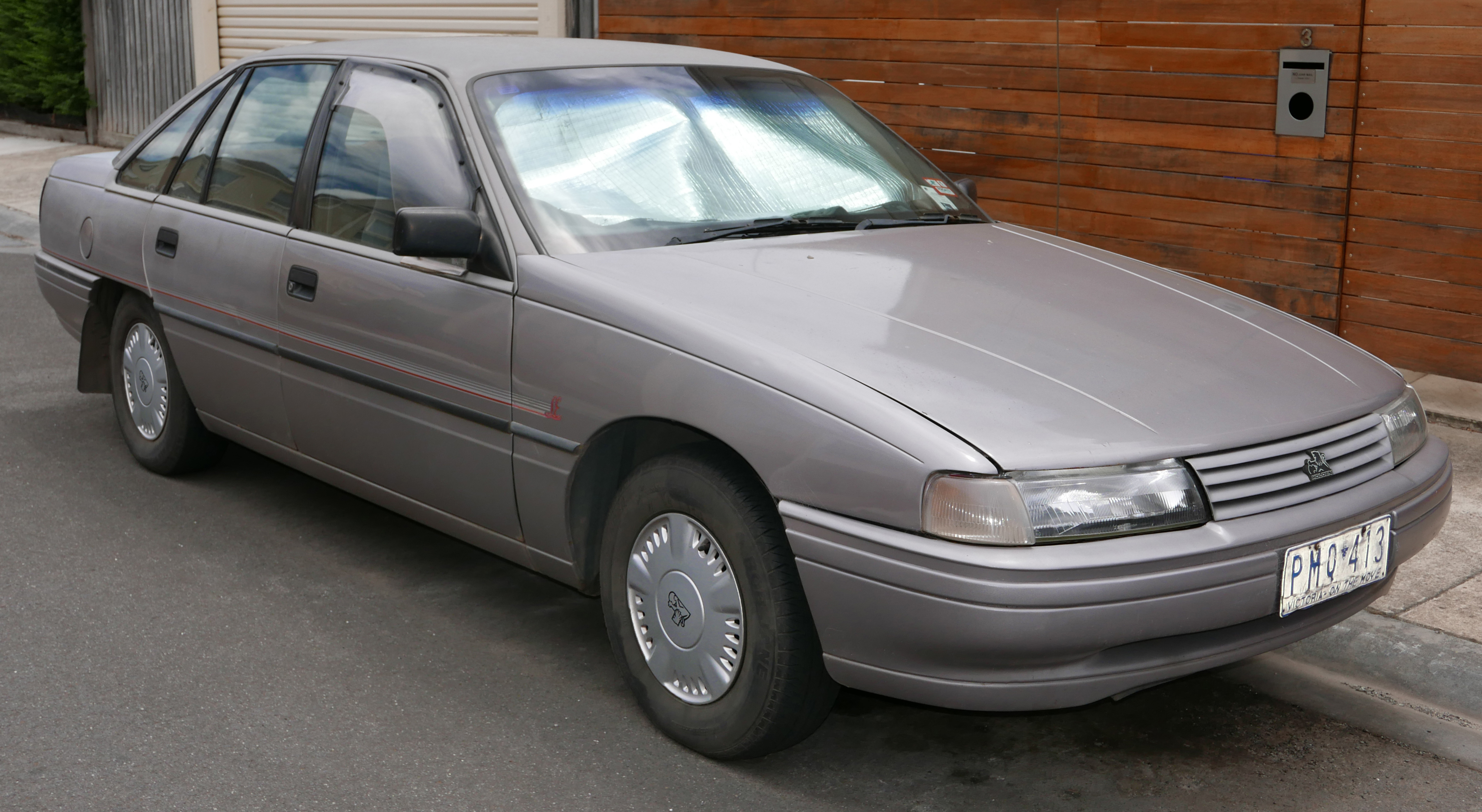
Holden Commodore LE sedan

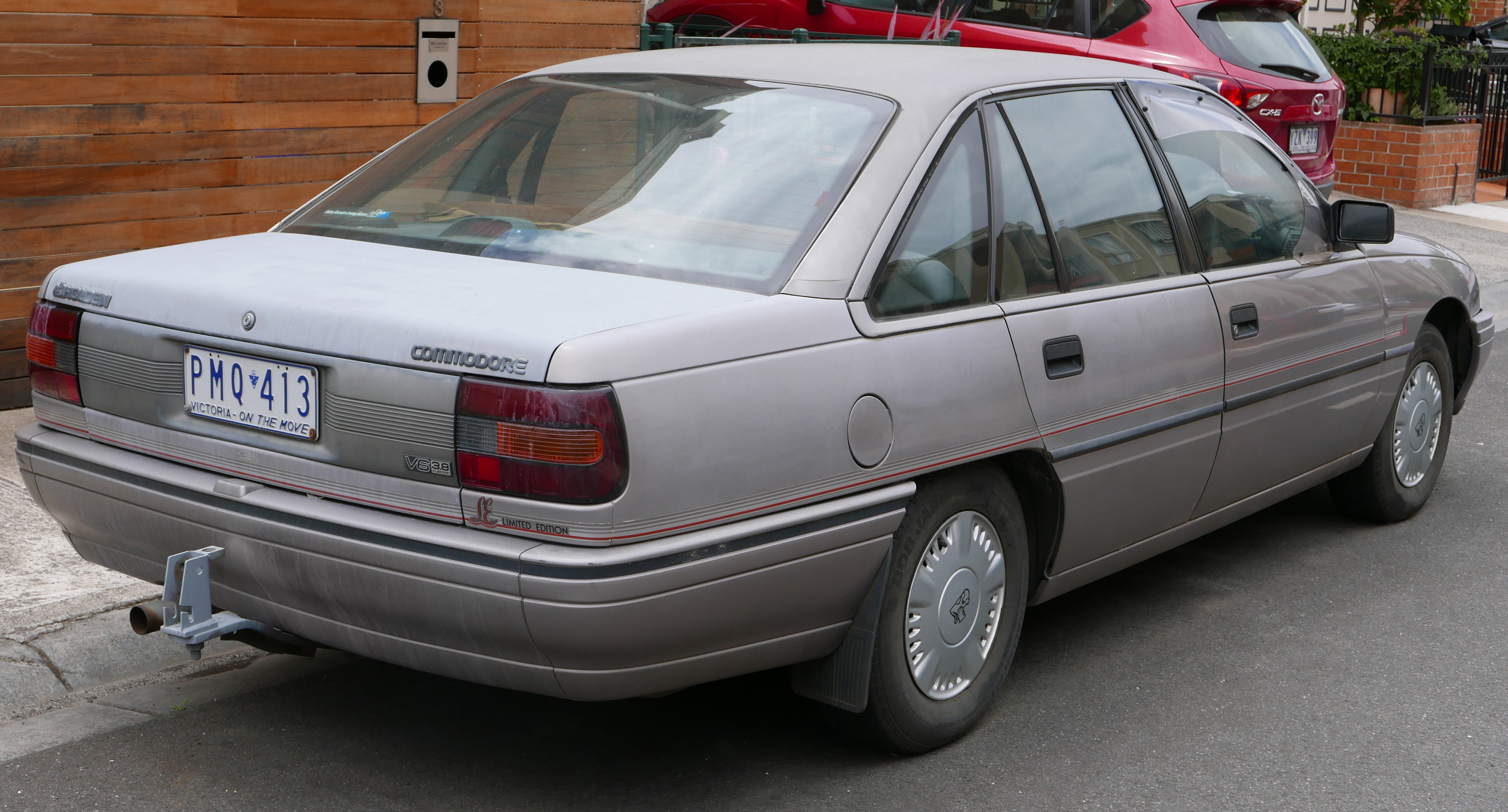
Holden Commodore LE sedan

=== Commodore LS ===
This limited edition was released in July 1991 and totalled 300 sedans for Australia (sold for $28,990) plus 130 sedans and 20 wagons for export to New Zealand, powered by the base 3.8-litre V6 engine.

It was the last released and cheapest VN Commodore, coinciding with the then imminent launch of the Ford Falcon (EB). Reportedly, at least one Australian sedan was fitted with a 5.0-Litre V8 engine and although no LS wagons were released in Australia, an enhancement pack was made available as an optional on any Commodore wagon.

Its interior features a Calais steering wheel, HSV retrimmed seats with matching Statesman striped velour inserts in seats and diagonal pattern door trims as part of the optional "Power Pack" (fitted as standard on the Calais). Externally, the car was available painted either Atlas Grey or Imperial Blue over Asteroid Silver two tone paint scheme, SV3800 body kit, body coloured boot garnish, smoked tail light lenses, LS decals on rear of front wheel arches, HSV logo moulded into driver side rear spoiler and Commodore LS decals on passenger side rear spoiler. The wheels consisted of HSV Sports Equipment alloy rims with 7 pairs of silver spokes forming a star pattern with recessed center HSV badge and wheel nuts.

=== Commodore Challenger ===
This limited edition of 50 sedans was available between June 1990 and June 1991 exclusively for the Holden dealer group in Canberra.

Codenamed "8VK19 A9W", it was based on a Commodore Executive but upgraded to the S pack. In addition to body-coloured wheel covers, bumper bars and bonnet garnish the car also featured the HSV 8 Plus grille, SV3800 red and silver pin stripes and Challenger decal pack on driver's side of the bootlid and trailing edges of rear doors below the body mouldings. It was only available in Alpine White and the interior featured a black Calais steering wheel, rear headrests and Challenger badge in dash pad.

=== Commodore GTS ===
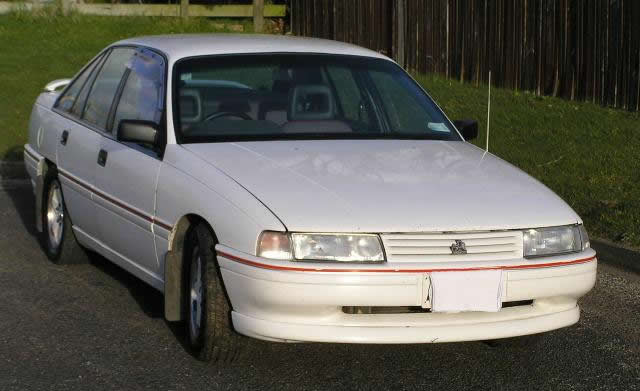
Holden Commodore GTS

The GTS of early 1990 was a limited run of 510 units for the New Zealand market. Powered by the base 3.8-Litre V6 engine it was based on the Executive model but featured upgrades including a body kit, 5-spoke alloy wheels and FE2 sports suspension (with upgraded springs and stabiliser bar for the front end and gas filled shocks absorbers at the back), larger front brake discs and master brake cylinder. The front suspension geometry was also modified to lower ride height by 35 mm for improved road handling. Inside, the car had power windows, central locking, electric antenna and four speaker radio cassette sound system. Suggested retail was $35,995 GTS and $37,295 GTS for the manual and automatic versions, respectively. It was available painted Vivid White or GTS Blue metallic (in Australia, Alpine White or Imperial Blue).

=== Commodore DMG 90 ===
This limited edition of 50 units was exclusively made available to the Holden dealer group of Queensland, for sale at the Brisbane Motor Show in April 1990. DMG stands for "Dealer Marketing Group" who commissioned the model, but they were built by HSV and then sold through Holden (not HSV) dealerships. They are a standalone HSV model, recognised as such, and wear HSV ID. However, they basically a parts-bin special.

DMG 90 was akin to a V6 Clubsport but was based on the Commodore S pack and featured: Alpine White paint; SV 3800 bodykit; VL Calais 15-inch alloys; Commodore SS brakes; FE2 suspension with strengthened Panhard rod and wider front track; strengthened boot; front and rear power windows and power mirrors; air conditioning; power steering with Momo wheel; 3.8-litre V6 engine with extractors and big bore exhaust system.

=== Commodore BT1 (police pack) ===
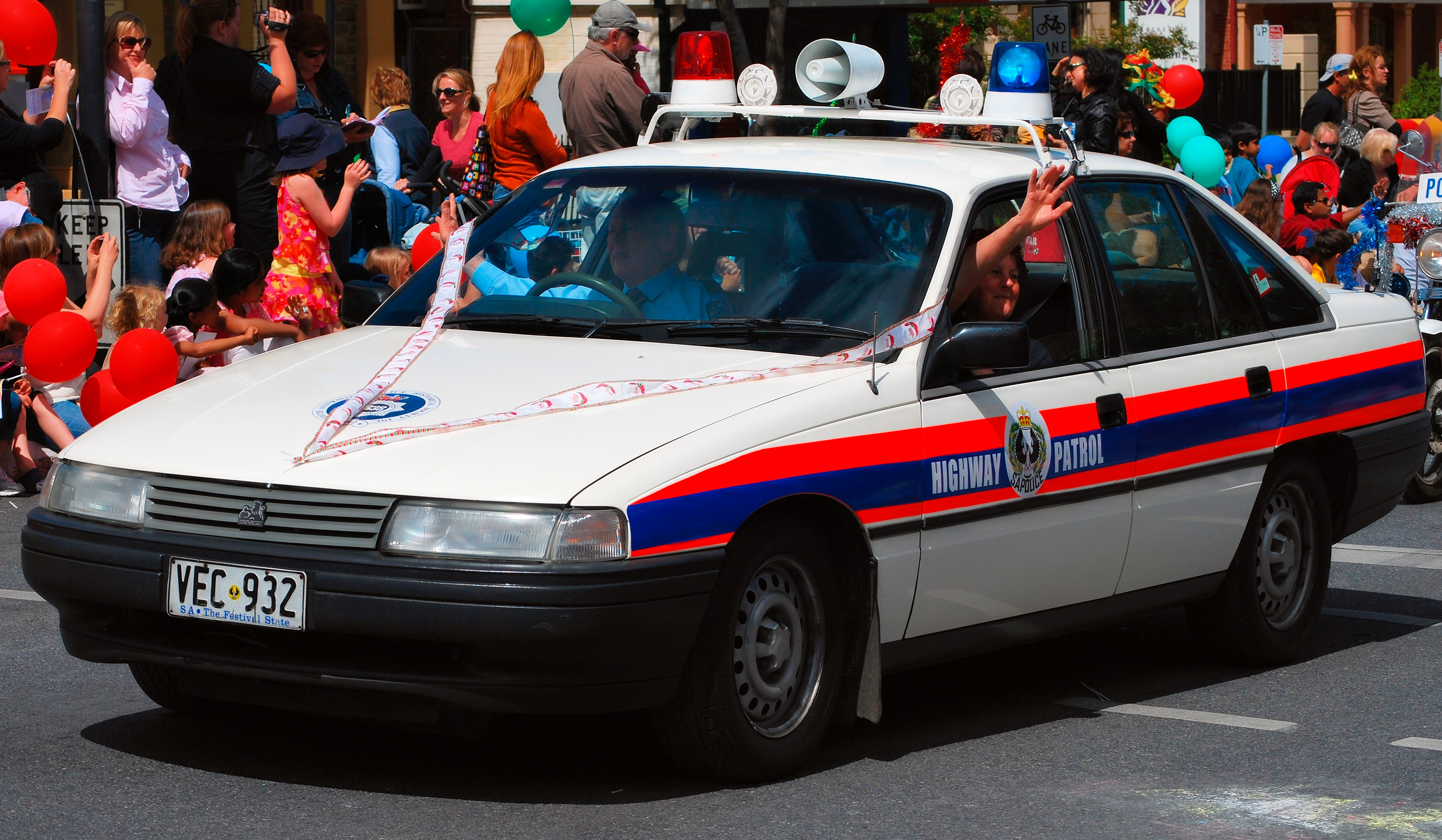
Holden Commodore BT1, police pack

The Commodore BT1 was a special pack for the VN Commodore that was available to the Australian and New Zealand police forces. They were based on the Executive and were fitted with either the 3.8 V6 or 5.0-litre V8.

The features of this model superseded and added to those of the donor Executive model. Although the pack varied by police force, they were commonly fitted with:

- 3.8-litre V6 or 5.0-litre 165 kW (221 hp) V8 engines
- Engine tuning stage 5
- Extractors
- Larger capacity V8 fuel tank
- 15x6 steel wheels with centre caps
- 4-speed automatic transmission
- FE2 sports suspension
- Oil sump protector
- Unique instrument cluster with 200 km/h speedometer
- Unique interior lighting
- SS exhaust pack
- Transmission cooler
- Automatic gear selector allows selection of "2" without use of shift lock button
- larger 22mm wheel nuts (larger tyre iron supplied with vehicle).

== HSV range ==
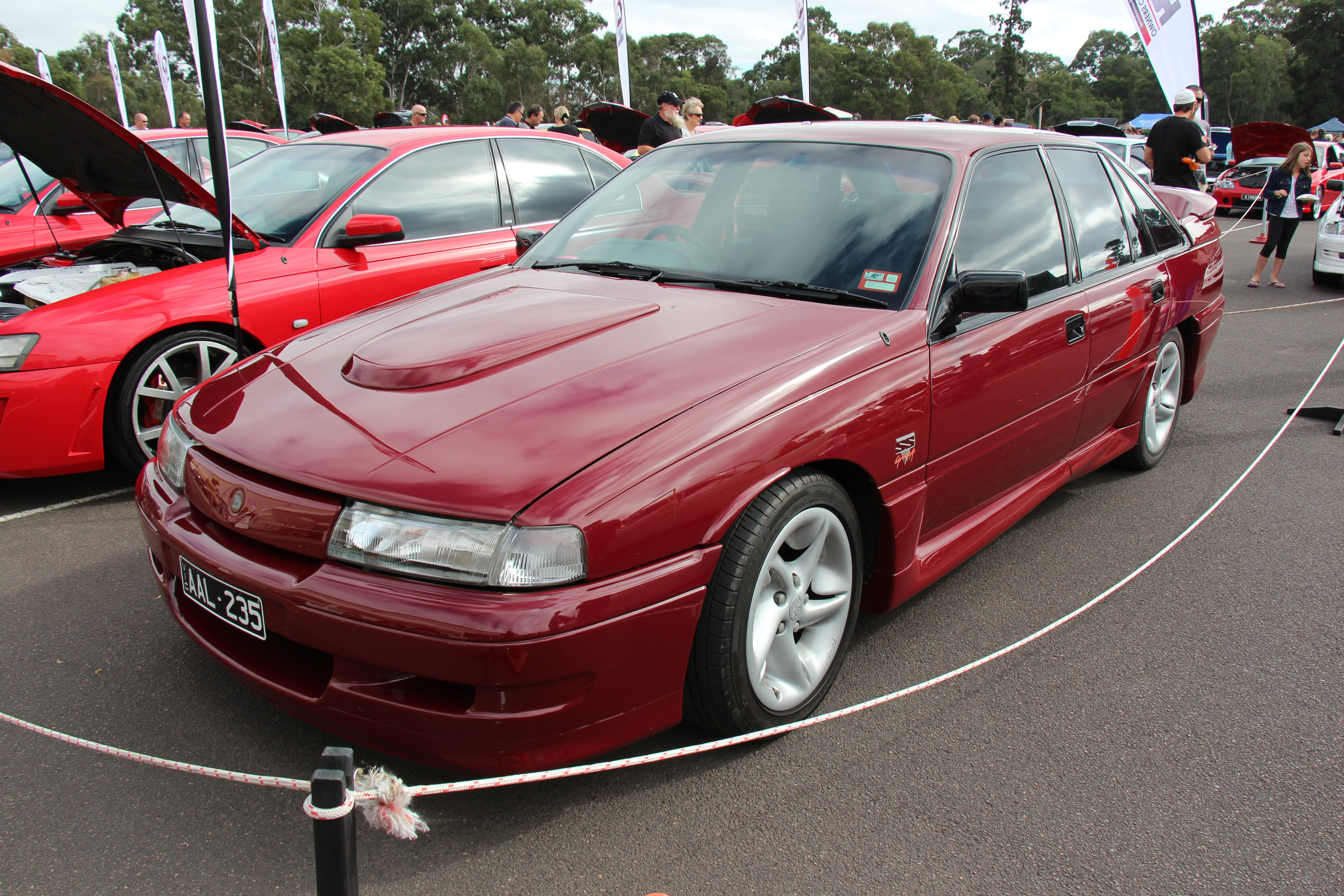
Holden Commodore SS Group A SV

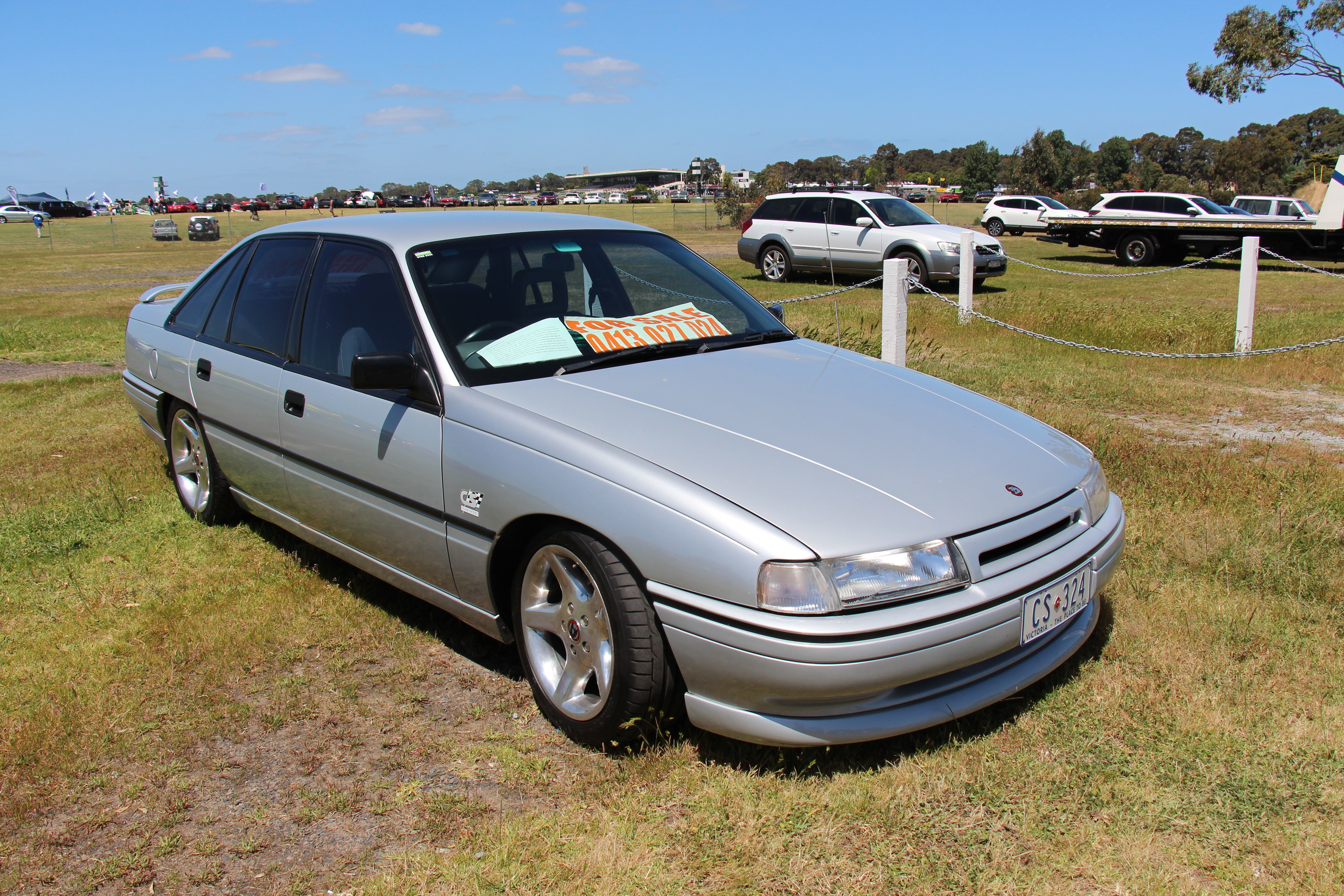
HSV Clubsport

The enhanced performance VN range sold by Holden Special Vehicles (HSV) comprised the following models (including VQ and VG):

- SV3800 – 1988 onwards
- SV89 – 200 built March 1989 – July 1989
- SV90 Statesman – 135 built July 1990 – September 1991
- SV91 – 1 built April 1991
- SV100 – unknown
- SV6 – 64 built April 1989 – May 1991
- SV LE – 110 sedans August 1989 – September 1989; 80 wagons August 1989 – January 1990
- SV5000 – 359 built September 1989 – August 1991
- LE – 100 built October 1989 – January 1990
- Plus 8 – 80 built March 1990 – April 1990
- DMG 90 – 50 built April 1990
- T30 – 30 built June 1990; 10 built May 1991 – July 1991
- Challenger – 50 built June 1990
- Club Sport – 410 built June 1990 – August 1991
- Holden Commodore SS Group A SV – 302 Built November 1990 – March 1991
- + Six – 1991 100 built March 1991 – August 1991
- Statesman 5000i – 8 Built May 1991
- LS – 450 built July 1991 – September 1991
- LS Utility – (VG and VP) 54 built September 1991 – June 1993
- Maloo – 132 built October 1990 – April 1993

=== Commodore SS Group A SV ===
The SS Group A SV was a racing homologation special based on the VN Commodore SS. Built at the Holden Elizabeth Plant, it was extensively modified at Clayton, Victoria by Holden Special Vehicles. It was powered by a 215 kW (288 hp) 4.9 litre Holden V8 engine, which was mated to a six-speed ZF S6-40 manual transmission. All were painted maroon.

The SS Group A SV was built specifically so a racing optimised version of the Commodore to be raced in Group A touring car motor racing. The regulations set down by FISA required a minimum of 500 road-going versions. Only 302 were produced after Holden indicated it would struggle to sell 500, with the Confederation of Australian Motor Sport giving Holden dispensation to race the car.

=== Clubsport ===
The VN Series HSV Clubsport was released in June 1990 and was based on the VN Commodore. It was offered as a four-door sedan with a 180 kW (245 PS; 241 hp) 5.0-litre Holden V8 engine.

=== Special editions ===
In addition to the above mainstream models, HSV also built the following special editions and prototype, respectively:

SV LE

Limited edition V8 model from August 1989. 110 sedans were built until September 1989, and 80 wagons until January 1990.

Convertible prototype

Built in 1989 as a feasibility study—and bearing the eventual front styling of the VP series—this car never made it into production and is now displayed at the National Holden Motor Museum in Echuca, Victoria.

== Motorsport ==
=== Group A ===
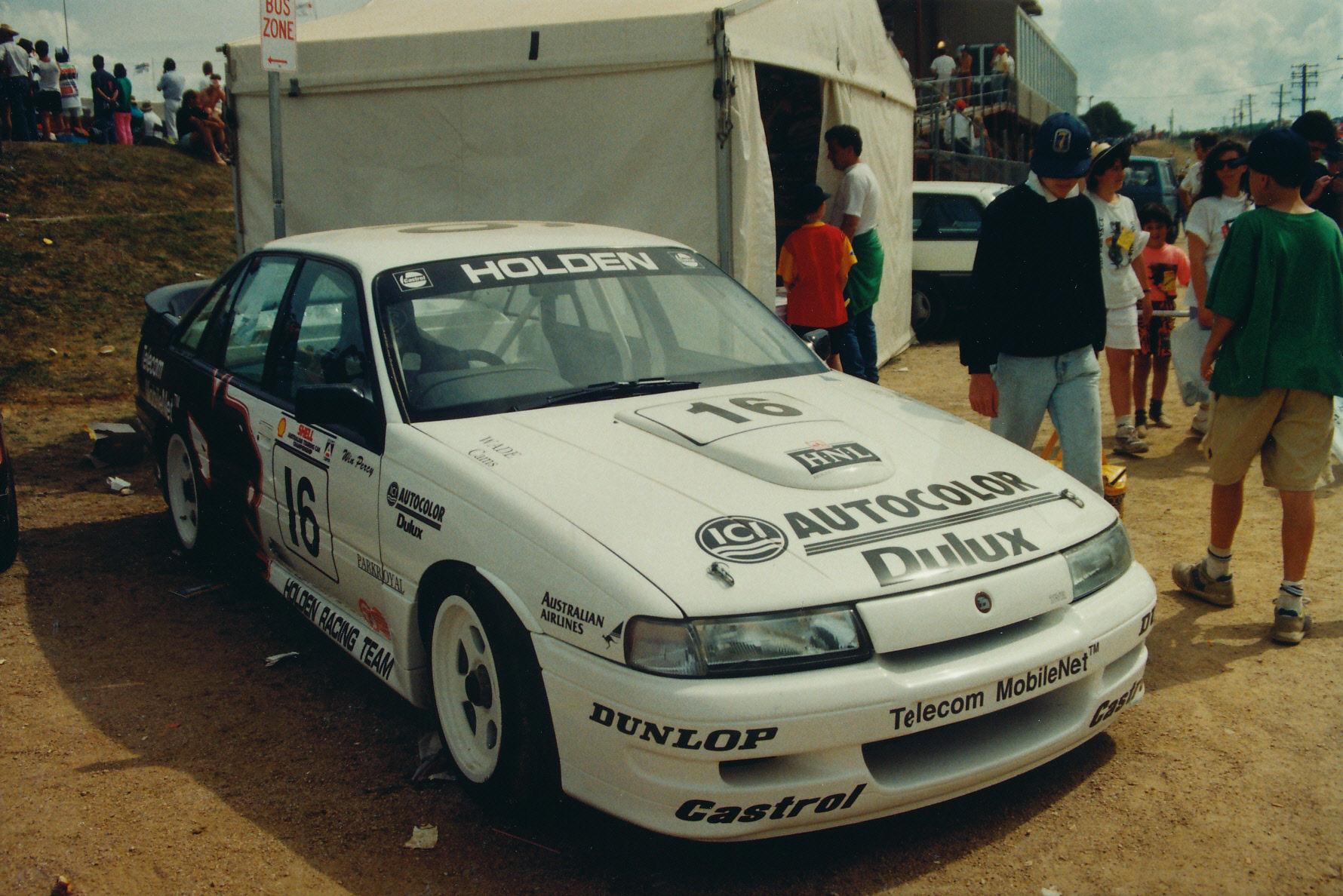
Holden VN Commodore SS Group A SV

Group A regulations governed many touring car series between the 1980s and 1990s including in Australia, New Zealand, Great Britain, Japan, Italy, Germany and the European Touring Car Championship as well as the one-off 1987 World Touring Car Championship as well as significant races like the Bathurst 1000, Spa 24 Hours and the RAC Tourist Trophy.

The arrival of the Commodore SS Group A SV, coincided with the return of former Holden racing driver, Peter Brock, for the first time since their acrimonious split in 1987. Brock teamed with former three time Bathurst co-winner and HDT driver, Larry Perkins and his team for the first time since 1985 to run two cars under Brock's Mobil sponsorship. The team formed a two-pronged attack by Holden, which also comprised Holden Racing Team led by British driver Win Percy.

Engine outputs of this race car produced approximately 388 kW (528 PS; 520 hp), enabling it to reach 300 km/h (186 mph) with suitable gearing. It was also equipped with a specially homologated Holinger six-speed transmission, and their homologated racing weight was 1,250 kg (2,760 lb), down from the VL SV's 1,325 kg (2,921 lb).

The SS Group A SV — as was the rest of the field that included Ford Sierra RS500 and the BMW M3 Evolution teams — was outclassed in the 1991 ATCC by the Gibson Motorsport built Nissan Skyline R32 GT-R' of reigning champion Jim Richards and his teammate, Mark Skaife. Major complaints by Holden drivers included that the VN SS Group A SV lacked downforce compared to the VL series SV. Reportedly, this was a consequence of Holden demanding that the car be more eye pleasing to its predecessor, which was given various nicknames including the "plastic pig". While the car had a better aerodynamic drag and was significantly faster in a straight line than the VL (at Bathurst that year, Brock recorded 278 km/h (173 mph) in the Tooheys Top 10 runoff, and aided by a tow from the Sierra of Dick Johnson was recorded at 282 km/h (175 mph) in the race compared to around 270 km/h (168 mph) for the VL the year before), it was slower through the corners due to the lack of downforce. This meant that while lap times at most of the shorter ATCC tracks stayed almost the same as with the VL, the VN's were actually slower at Bathurst by around two seconds, though in fairness the VL series had 3 years development compared to less than 1 year for the VN.

Brock gave the VN its only win in Group A racing when he won the opening heat of the first round of the 1992 Australian Touring Car Championship at Amaroo Park in Sydney, though both he and HRT were again uncompetitive during the season to the point that the leading Holden runner became Larry Perkins running a privately entered VL model. In September 1992 the VN was replaced as Holden's front line touring car for Sandown and Bathurst by its VP series successor. Brock's team was the only top team to run the VN Group A in the endurance races as the team's second car driven by Andrew Miedecke and Troy Dunston. The VN continued to be used by various privateers in 1993 and 1994 and last raced in the 1994 Australian Touring Car Championship by long time Holden running Sydney-based privateer, Terry Finnigan.

=== AUSCAR ===
The VN model was introduced to Bob Jane's AUSCAR category in the 1990/91 season. AUSCAR was based on America's NASCAR stock car racing, with the major differences being that the cars were based on the Holden Commodore and Ford Falcon road cars and were not pure space frame chassis like NASCAR. AUSCAR's also ran smaller V8 engines (5.0 L compared to 6.0 L) which developed less power, and as the cars are right hand drive, raced clockwise on the ovals tracks (the Jane owned Calder Park Thunderdome and the ½ mile Speedway Super Bowl at the Adelaide International Raceway) whereas the NASCAR's being left hand drive raced anticlockwise. The theory being that the driver was positioned on the side of the car that was furthest from the outside wall. Also unlike NASCAR, AUSCAR's used a control tyre with tread that was more like a road tyre than a pure racing slick.

The VN was instantly successful in AUSCAR racing and was soon a popular choice as a replacement for the older VK and VL models. Albury based touring car driver Brad Jones won three straight Australian championships driving his CooperTools Racing VN Commodore in 1990/91, 1991/92 and 1992/93.

=== NASCAR ===
A VN model Commodore was also developed for NASCAR racing in Australia. Bob Jane, wanting local involvement from Holden (Ford was already represented with the American Thunderbird model), pushed development of a left hand drive VN. Highly respected Roadways Racing chief mechanic Les Small developed the car which Allan Grice drove to a number of race wins in 1990 at both the Calder Thunderdome and Adelaide. The VN used a 358-cubic-inch (6.0 L) Chevrolet engine such as used in the Chevrolet Monte Carlo, Chevrolet Lumina and Pontiac Grand Prix NASCAR's.

Bob Jane had hoped to take the VN NASCAR for Grice to the United States to race in the NASCAR's Winston Cup series, but a fallout between himself as the sanctioning body in Australia, and NASCAR in the USA saw the VN remain in Australia. However, Bob Jane's dream of bringing a Commodore to race in NASCAR in the United States would come into fruition in 2013 with NASCAR's premiership, as General Motors made the decision to use a VF Commodore for the series in the United States, as the VF is sold in the United States as a niche market performance sedan known to Americans as the Chevrolet SS.
