= Advantage Racing =

Australian touring car racing team

- Manufacturer: Holden
- Team Principal: Steve Frazer
- Team Manager: John Stevenson
- Race Drivers: Peter Brock; Neil Crompton; Troy Dunstan; Andrew Miedecke; Manuel Reuter; Graeme Crosby; Charlie O'Brien; Steve Harrington; John Cleland
- Chassis: Commodore VN; Commodore VP
- Debut: 1992
- 1993 position: 8th (Brock)

Advantage Racing was an Australian touring car racing team that competed in the Australian Touring Car Championship in 1992 and 1993.

== History ==
At the end of 1990 Peter Brock concluded a deal with his former Bathurst 1000 winning co-driver Larry Perkins, that saw him close down his Mobil 1 Racing team and bring his sponsorship to Perkins Engineering. Two Holden Commodore VNs were built, with Perkins driving the second car.

At the end of 1991, Brock and Perkins decided to go their separate ways with Brock's manager, Steve Frazer, forming Advantage Racing based in North Melbourne. As part of the deal, the two 1991 Perkins Engineering built Commodore VNs were purchased by Advantage.

For 1992, Neil Crompton was signed to drive the second car, but a funding shortfall saw the team scale back to one car after four rounds and miss two rounds entirely. One of the VNs was upgraded to VP specifications for Bathurst.

In 1993 only one car was entered for Brock, initially a converted VN with a new VP debuting mid-season. The team again expanded to two cars for Sandown and Bathurst endurance races. At the end of 1993, a deal was concluded that saw Brock and the Mobil sponsorship move to the Holden Racing Team and Advantage Racing was wound up.

Although the team never won a round, Brock won heats at Amaroo Park in 1992 and Oran Park in 1993.
