= Daily Planet (brothel) =

Publicly listed Australian company (1975–2018)

Coordinates: 37°53′4.7″S 144°59′59.2″E

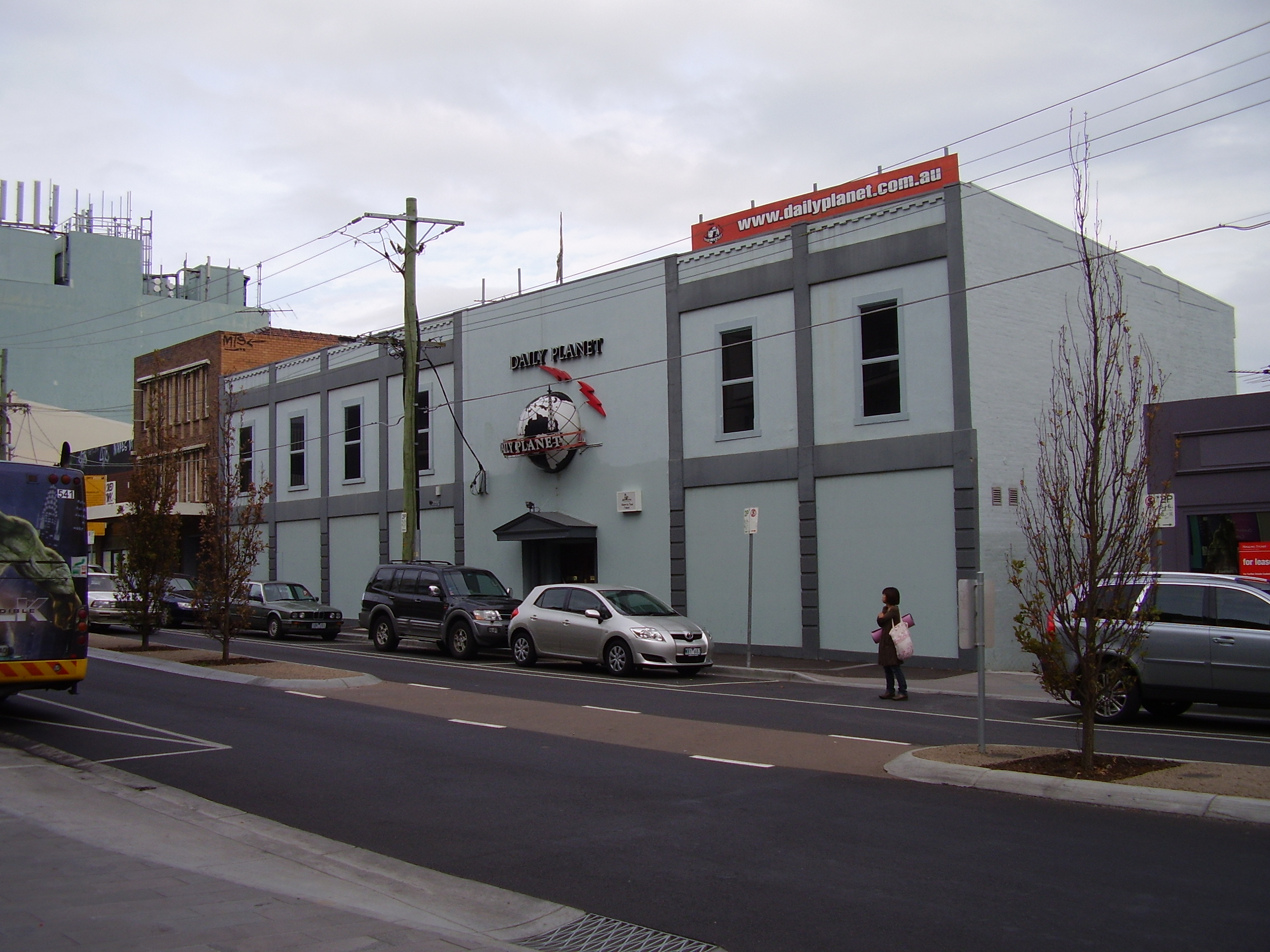
- Traded as: ASX: PPL
- Industry: Sex industry
- Founded: 1975
- Founder: John Trimble
- Defunct: 2018
- Headquarters: Elsternwick, Melbourne, Australia
- Services: Brothel
- Website: www.dailyplanet.sex

The Daily Planet was a licensed brothel in Melbourne, Australia. The 18-room establishment was located in Horne Street, Elsternwick. It was also mentioned in interviews and promoted by Blink 182 during an Australian tour in 1998 and Jim Jefferies during stand up.

The Daily Planet was founded in 1975 by John Trimble, the nephew of crime boss Robert Trimbole.

In 2003, the brothel's operation was separated from its real-estate holdings, and the real estate property trust, named The Daily Planet Limited, proceeded with an initial public offering on the Australian Securities Exchange. Heidi Fleiss had been hired to generate publicity. The company acquired a strip club business in 2003.

In 2003, the public company resolved to sell the Daily Planet building for $5.7 million. The company changed its name to Planet Platinum Limited and went on to pursue its investments in strip clubs. However, the sale of the Daily Planet building never happened, and the property was taken off the market in 2006.

In 2018, the Daily Planet closed down with the building transformed into a Drug and Alcohol Rehabilitation Centre called the Wellbeing Planet.

== Sponsorships ==
The Daily Planet was the primary sponsor of Daily Planet Racing, John Trimble's motor racing team that competed in the Australian Touring Car Championship in the 1990s.
