= List of individual monkeys =

This annotated list of individual monkeys includes monkeys who are in some way famous or notable. The list does not include notable apes or fictional primates.

== Monkey actors ==
- Crystal – (brown capuchin) played in The Hangover Part II, Night at the Museum, Night at the Museum: Battle of the Smithsonian, Night at the Museum: Secret of the Tomb and as "Annie's Boobs" in Community.

== Monkeys used in experiments ==
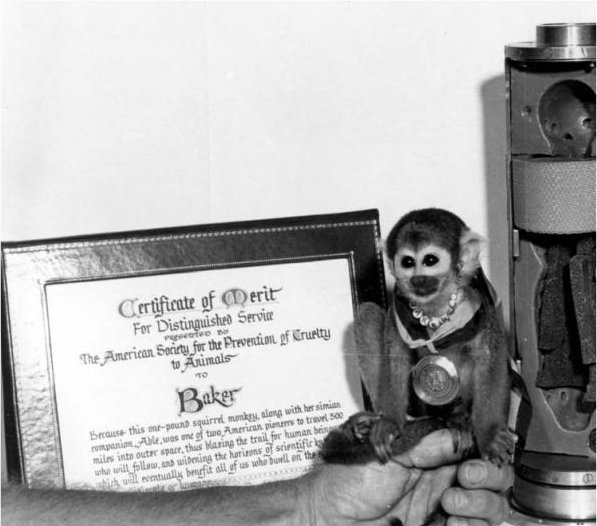
Miss Baker, with her Certificate of Merit from the ASPCA

- Miss Able (rhesus macaque) and Miss Baker (Peruvian squirrel monkey), both female – the first monkeys sent into space who survived the experience. They were launched on 28 May 1959 in the nose cone of a Jupiter AM-18 missile as a test of NASA's launch facilities at Cape Canaveral and procedures for retrieving astronauts after splashdown. Miss Able died a few days after the mission, but Miss Baker lived another 25 years.
- Albert I – (rhesus macaque) the first primate and first mammal launched on a rocket (a June 18, 1948 V-2 flight), although it did not reach space.
- Albert II – (rhesus macaque) the first primate and first mammal in space, June 14, 1949. Died upon hitting the ground due to a parachute failure
- ANDi – (rhesus macaque) the first genetic modified rhesus macaque, born at the Oregon Health & Science University
- Britches – (stump-tailed macaque) removed from his mother at birth, Britches was left alone with his eyes sewn shut as part of a study into blindness. He was rescued by the Animal Liberation Front, which publicized the condition he was found in, and the experiment was shut down.
- Gordo (also known as "Old Reliable") – (squirrel monkey) He was launched in the US Jupiter AM-13 Rocket in 1958, but was lost after a technical failure at the end of the mission.
- Tetra – a rhesus macaque at the Oregon National Primate Research Center who was the first cloned primate, created through splitting.

== Other ==
- Corporal Jackie, a chacma baboon of the South African army
- Darwin, a Japanese macaque who earned notoriety as the "Ikea Monkey"
- Fred, a chacma baboon who became notorious for leading raids on human homes and gardens in South Africa. Authorities caught and killed him, sparking controversy.
- Jacco Macacco, was a fighting ape or monkey used in monkey-baiting matches at the Westminster Pit in London in the early 1820s.

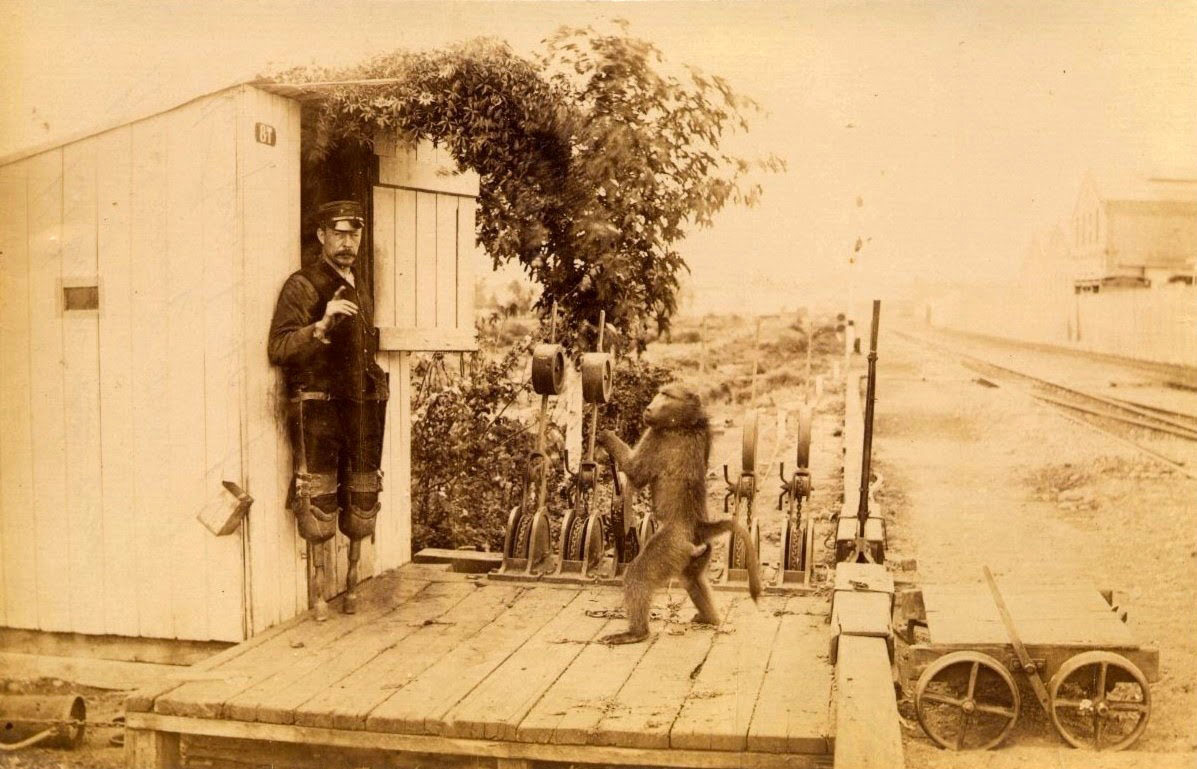
Jack the Signalman

- Jack the Signalman, a chacma baboon hired to help work the railroad signals for the Cape Government Railway.
- Loon, a drill at the San Diego Zoo and was trained to accept blood draws and insulin injections to treat his diabetes.
- Maggie the Monkey, a crab-eating macaque who predicted the results of the Stanley Cup playoffs.
- Natasha (monkey), a Celebes crested macaque at the safari park zoo in Tel Aviv, Israel.
- Pockets Warhol, a capuchin monkey housed at Story Book Farm
- Punch-kun, an orphaned Japanese macaque at the Ichikawa City Zoo. In 2026, he gained viral attention on social media due to his attachment to a stuffed orangutan toy.
- Ramu, a rhesus macaque arrested and kept behind bars in India for 5 years on the charge of disturbing communal harmony. At the age of three, while under the care of a family, Ramu attacked some children. This sparked communal riots in the Jagannathpur village, ultimately leading to Ramu's arrest.
- Twelves (December 12, 2012 – March 20, 2018), a robust capuchin who was a pet monkey of Brazilian singer Latino.
- Xing Xing, a wild one-armed Tibetan macaque who resides in the Daliang Mountains of China, where she had gained iconicity from social media appearances.

== See also ==
- List of fictional primates
- List of individual apes
- Monkeys and apes in space
