= Ramu (monkey) =

Ramu is a rhesus macaque living in the Baleswar district of the Indian state of Odisha. The monkey was kept behind bars at the Remuna police station in Orissa for 5 years on the charge of disturbing communal harmony.

== Arrest ==
Ramu was three years old when he attacked and bit a number of children in Jagannathpur village. A Muslim family was taking care of Ramu while the children belonged to the Hindu community, sparking communal tension in the area. The local police decided to arrest the animal after the incident. Once freed, the monkey again went back to biting children leading to his second arrest by the police. The police decided to put him behind bars for good.

== Release ==
Under Indian wildlife rules, rhesus macaque monkeys like Ramu are a Schedule II endangered species and cannot be kept as pets or in cages. Wildlife activists demanded that some action be taken by the Forest Department of the state. The police claim to have treated the animal well giving it regular meals. According to Niranjan Kumar Dhir, the officer-in-charge at the Remuna police station, the monkey was given regular baths and fed four times a day. Following more pressure from the activists and worldwide attention brought to Ramu's plight, the police released the monkey and handed it over to wildlife officials on October 18, 2006.

== See also ==
- List of individual monkeys
