= Twelves =

Brazilian pet monkey (2012–2018)

- Twelves in 2014
- Species: Robust capuchin monkey
- Sex: Male
- Born: 12 December 2012; Xanxerê, Santa Catarina, Brazil
- Died: 20 March 2018 (aged 5); Rio de Janeiro, Brazil
- Cause of death: Traffic collision
- Occupation: Pet
- Owner: Latino

Twelves (12 December 2012 – 20 March 2018) was the pet monkey of Brazilian singer Latino. He was given to Latino by the singer's manager in 2014, as a wedding gift. A robust capuchin monkey, Twelves was raised like a human baby and often accompanied Latino to shows, TV programs and photo shoots. Twelves had his own Instagram account with more than 100 thousand followers.

In 2016, the monkey was the subject of controversy after Latino posted a photo which appeared to show Twelves smoking a hookah. Latino received criticism for posting the image, and the Brazilian Institute of Environment and Renewable Natural Resources (IBAMA) released a statement saying that the singer would be held responsible for the post. The following year, Twelves disappeared for a day, and a search party was formed to find him. Twelves died in 2018 after he went missing and was hit by a vehicle. His body was cremated, and his ashes were turned into a synthetic diamond.

== Biography ==
=== Early life (2012–2015) ===
The robust capuchin monkey Twelves was born on 12 December 2012, in Xanxerê, Santa Catarina. He came from a shelter in Rio Grande do Sul, the only one certified by the Brazilian Institute of Environment and Renewable Natural Resources (IBAMA), and was trained by André Poloni, known as the greatest trainer of wild animals in the country. In February 2014, the singer was given a monkey as a wedding present by a businessman who worked with Latino when the singer married Rayanne Morais.

[Businessman who worked with Latino] asked me, "what do you want as a present?". I said, "a monkey". He then looked at me strangely. Rayanne at the time didn't want a child, and I already have plenty of children. So, I said the animal would end up distracting us. However, he thought the price of a monkey was low, not knowing that one could cost around 120,000 to 150,000 Brazilian reais.

— Latino (October 2017)

The name Twelves was a tribute to the singer's fascination with the number 12 and also because Twelves was born on "12/12/12". The couple had all the necessary IBAMA documentation, which regulates the licenses for the ownership of wild animals, and Twelves had a pet microchip which allowed officials to use a microchip reader to view the entire history of the monkey and its owner.

In June 2014, Latino posted a photo of himself giving Twelves a French kiss. The act was criticized by Internet users, who labeled it as disgusting. In November, Twelves participated in a photo shoot for one of Latino's albums. For Twelves's birthday the following month, a "super party" was hosted. The event was broadcast live on television and featured celebrity guests, including other monkeys. On 14 July 2015, Latino and Morais separated, leaving the animal to be in custody of the singer—the documents were registered under his name. However, he allowed Morais to visit Twelves whenever she wanted.

=== Controversy and disappearance (2016–2017) ===
Image that caused controversy

On 17 March 2016, Latino posted a photo showing Twelves on his shoulder, while Latino placed a hookah mouthpiece to the monkey's mouth. The translated caption read: "Even Twelves wants to take a gangster-style photo". This caused controversy, with many of Latino's followers condemning his behavior and calling the singer irresponsible. The post was deleted after the negative reaction, but the criticism continued. TV presenter Luisa Mell, a strong defender of animal rights, disapproved of the post and said that Latino "had no idea about the importance of these animals in nature" and that Ibama was "encouraging animal trafficking, compromising Brazilian biodiversity, endangering the health of animals and even contributing to the decimation of several species and their ecosystems". The next day, Latino criticized the media's coverage of the issue in a statement, and claimed that the image was a montage: "Is there a lack of subject matter? That's why our Brazil is not moving forward! If I were the press, I would be ashamed to publish a note like this [...] How much hypocrisy in a photo that I clearly stated was a gangster-style montage. This statement is for my audience, who I owe an explanation to, not for the sellers of fake news. I'm tired of this."

On 26 March, IBAMA declared that Latino would be held responsible for the case: "The authorization for the possession of wild animals does not allow for this type of treatment, therefore the singer Latino will be held accountable for this fact." Latino responded and contested the decision:

I want to see IBAMA have the guts to take the monkey away from me. It's not easy to take it from me. They just want to show off with this. There's nothing wrong with it. I was smoking the hookah, and he stopped to smell it, and the girl took the photo. When she took the photo, I asked her to post it because it was a funny moment, a show-off photo. But people like to take advantage of situations. There are so many things for IBAMA to investigate, so many things wrong on the planet, so much injustice.

On 8 July 2017, Latino posted a video, crying, stating that after returning from the United States and leaving Twelves at his home, the monkey suddenly disappeared. The singer claimed that, although the animal often went out for a walk, he usually came back shortly after. A large search force was formed to find the animal; at least 80 people participated in the search. After searching through woods, streams, and more than 30 condominiums in the Barra da Tijuca area, the monkey was found in a residence near the Jacarepaguá Airport the next day.

=== Death ===
On 20 March 2018, Twelves escaped from home, was hit by a vehicle, and died in Rio de Janeiro. Latino's agent stated that the singer was "very sad, inconsolable and does not want to talk to anyone". After hearing the news Latino postponed the recording of a music video. On his social media, he posted (translated): "Today is the unhappiest day of my life. Pray for me! I feel lost". The animal was cremated the next day at the Pet's Garden animal cemetery and crematorium. With its ashes, a diamond was made.

I am very emotional. I have just received the ashes of my monkey Twelves in the form of a beautiful diamond. Now he will be with me forever as a lucky charm. May the animal angels in heaven be with you. I miss you so much.

In April 2018, the singer received a female monkey named Ana Paula as a present, but made it clear that she would not replace Twelves. Ana Paula died on 24 November 2022. In 2021, the Secretary of Citizenship of the municipality of Rio de Janeiro filed a criminal report against Latino for religious intolerance, after he stated in an interview that Twelves's death was caused by "macumba", a pejorative term that refers to Afro-Brazilian religions.

== Treatment and personality ==
Twelves eating baby food

We are very attached to him, we treat him like a son. It's even good because it allows us to postpone our plans of becoming parents a little longer.

— Rayanne Morais (July 2014)

Twelves was treated similarly to a human baby. Following a feeding routine of every three hours, the animal consumed a bottle of milk made with infant formula for breakfast, and later started eating banana porridge and, occasionally, pudding. For lunch and dinner, Twelves ate baby food, such as those found in pharmacies and supermarkets. At other times, he ate various fruits and peanuts. Twelves always wore diapers, as he did not stay in a cage—he slept in a double box bed with various toys. The accessories were stored in a Louis Vuitton bag, along with stuffed animals and clothes, including a jumpsuit and a wool coat with a scarf. Latino also hired a private nanny for the animal. Described as a "restless and noisy" creature and an "enlightened animal" for his dangerous behavior, he often went out for walks. Latino stated that he would like to acquire another monkey to keep Twelves company, but was prevented by legal issues, as he could only keep Twelves after proving that he had access to a tree where the animal lived and other matters related to the animal's care. The monthly costs to take care of Twelves, which was around one thousand Brazilian reais, generated controversy, since, at the time, he was not paying a pension for one of his children.

Twelves often accompanied the artist to shows and television programs, including Mais Você and Programa do Jô, and participated in photo shoots for magazines and websites. Twelves became popular on the Internet. His Instagram account, created in May 2014, gained four thousand followers in just one month. By July 2015, it had 18 thousand followers; two years later, it had 50 thousand, and reached a hundred thousand in October 2017. After Twelves' death in March 2018, his account had 130 thousand followers.

== See also ==
- List of individual monkeys
- Macaco Tião
- Tião (dolphin)
