= Tetra (monkey) =

Rhesus macaque that was created through embryo splitting

- Breed: Rhesus macaque
- Sex: Female
- Born: Tetra; October 12, 1999 (age 26); Oregon Regional Primate Research Center
- Nationality: United States
- Known for: Cloned animal
- Named after: Ancient Greek for "four"

Tetra (born October 12, 1999) is a rhesus macaque that was created through a cloning technique called "embryo splitting". She is the first "cloned" primate by artificial twinning, and was created by a team led by Professor Gerald Schatten of the Oregon National Primate Research Center.

== Description ==
Tetra was created using embryo splitting, a process where the cells in the embryo are split at the eight–cell stage to create four identical two cell embryos. This was the first time this technique had proven successful in monkeys, although it is often used in cattle. She was the first primate to have been cloned using this "splitting" technique. The first non-human primate derived from nuclear transfer was created in 1997 using a different technique for "cloning". Only two of the four embryos survived to a sufficient stage in which they could be implanted into surrogates, and Tetra was the only one to be delivered successfully after 157 days. The announcement of Tetra was made on 13 January 2000, when she was four months old. It was thought that by producing identical primates, advances in human medical research could be made. A further four monkeys, cloned using this same technique were due to be born in May 2000.

The team at the Oregon National Primate Research Center working on the project was led by Professor Gerald Schatten, who described the process involved as "artificial twinning". It was not the same technique used to produce Dolly the sheep, which involved transferring material from an adult animal into an empty cell sack.

In following year, the team produced another rhesus macaque, named Andi, who was the first genetically modified monkey. The egg that was used had been modified to include the jellyfish gene to make cells glow under a special microscope.

== See also ==
- ANDi
- List of individual monkeys
- List of cloned animals
