= Natasha (monkey) =

Natasha is a Celebes crested macaque at the Safari Park zoo near Tel Aviv, Israel. She has become well known because, unlike other macaques who move by alternating between walking upright and on all four limbs, Natasha has walked upright all the time since suffering from a stomach flu that almost killed her.

She recovered after receiving intensive-care treatment, and while her other behaviour remained normal, she began walking erect solely on her hind legs, which gained her immediate media attention; the Maariv daily newspaper showed a picture of her striding through the grass, with the tongue-in-cheek caption "The Missing Link?".

The zoo's veterinarian, Yigal Horowitz, remarked: "I've never seen or heard of this before... One possible explanation is brain damage from the illness."

== See also ==
- List of individual monkeys
