= Xing Xing =

One-armed Tibetan macaque

- Species: Tibetan macaque
- Sex: Female
- Residence: Daliang Mountains, Ninghai County, Zhejiang, China

Xing Xing (Chinese: 星星) is a Tibetan macaque who lives in the Daliang Mountains in Zhejiang province, Ningbo, Ninghai county, Dongnanxi Villagers Committee, China. She is one-armed and famous online for videos of her visiting Yanghu Temple, where she is cared for by an elder nun named Ye Liannu.

She has garnered considerable popularity on social media networks, especially among Chinese audiences, due to her friendly interactions with Ye Liannu and visitors.

According to the temple's head abbot Ying, Xing Xing lost her arm to a boar trap and was briefly held in captivity. After her release, she made her way to the Daliang Mountains, where she began to be looked after by the attendants of Yanghu Temple. Although Xing Xing's age is unknown, she has lived in the Daliang Mountain range for over fifteen years.

== Biography ==
Xing Xing (Chinese: 星星 meaning "star-star") is a one-armed Tibetan macaque who resides in the Daliang Mountains, located within the Dongnanxi Village in Ninghai County, which is within the province of Zhejiang. The head abbot of Yanghu Temple, Ying, said in an interview that Xing Xing had been a circus monkey. Later, Xing Xing lost one of her arms after it got caught in a wild boar trap. He also revealed that a hunter found the monkey and sold her to a village near the mountains. She was reportedly kept in a restaurant as entertainment for visitors for a short time, but the villagers let her go because they could not afford to keep feeding her fruits and peanuts. She later came across the Yanghu Temple, where an elder nun, Tai Chang, fed the macaque and named her "Xing Xing." Monkeys do not currently naturally reside in Ninghai County.

At the time of her arrival, Xing Xing was pregnant and in poor health; her infant died during the winter. She had a large iron chain collar tied around her neck, harming her skin. A worker from the Ningbo Zoo helped remove it, but it had already created a permanent scar around her neck. Ye Liannu, an elderly nun and local resident, is the main caretaker of Xing Xing, although the macaque remains free-ranging. According to Ye, the macaque was at first afraid but came to trust her and even seek her out, as Ye came to the mountains to feed her. She also revealed that Xing Xing was capable of peeling seeds and fruit and operating faucets with her one hand. Ye described Xing Xing as generally friendly but, as a wild animal, also known to display aggression, such as grabbing people's clothes. Ye aimed to resolve such conflicts by calming her down.

Xing Xing is also noted for interacting with cats and is capable of moving quickly despite only having one arm. Additionally, Xing Xing is capable of drinking from straws, such as whenever she is being fed from a box of milk. Ying stated that Xing Xing's presence helped to make the village more lively; with the three temple caretakers including him, Ye and a cleaning staff member being the ones to feed her food typically in the morning. He said that she tended to steal food at first, but she no longer does so. Additionally, according to Ying, she often visited the area in the afternoon for a few hours before departing elsewhere. As of 2023, it had been more than fifteen years since she was first taken in by the Buddhist nun, her age being unknown.

== Popularity ==
Xing Xing became popular in 2021 when a photo of her eating food went viral on social media. She gained the largest following among Chinese audiences, drawing local visitors to Yanghu Temple. Videos of her have been uploaded on X, TikTok and YouTube, some gaining millions of views each. Her popularity among audiences is credited to her well-tempered and friendly personality, leading to visitors from other countries seeking to visit her. Some of her fans had approached to feed her. However, primate experts and ecologists generally discourage people from feeding wild or free-ranging monkeys.

Ye has also warned against feeding Xing Xing, as it risks provoking aggressive behavior. In October 2022, a tourist brought grapes for Xing Xing. When Ye took them away out of concern for Xing Xing's over-eating, the monkey bit her, resulting in a bruise. Ye sought medical attention for the wound, including rabies vaccine. In light of the incident, Chayuan Township members put up warning signs within the Daliang Mountains, advising visitors not to touch Xing Xing or feed her too much food.

== See also ==
- List of individual monkeys
