= Luka (singer) =

Brazilian singer

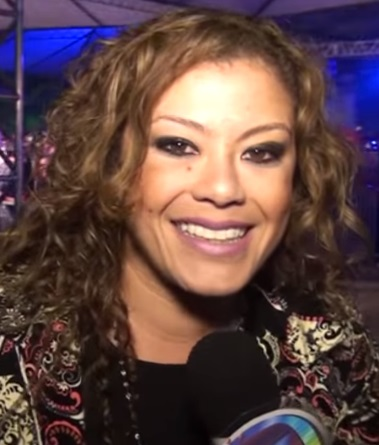
- Luka in October 2013.

Background information
- Born: Luciana Karina Santos de Lima; June 26, 1979 (age 47); Porto Alegre, Brazil
- Genres: Pop; rock
- Occupations: Singer; songwriter
- Instruments: Vocals; guitar
- Years active: 2003–present
- Labels: Sony Music (2003-2004); Warner Music (2006-2007); Independent (2009-2014); VideoBes (2015-present)
- Website: luka.com.br

Luciana Karina Santos de Lima better known by her stage name Luka (born in Porto Alegre, Brazil on 26 June 1979) is a Brazilian singer and songwriter. She has released 4 studio albums.

She started singing and playing guitar at 16 when she was known as Luciana Lima, performed in venues in Rio Grande do Sul. She also appeared in music festivals such as Planeta Atlântica. Besides guitar, she learned piano, music theory and joined a choir called Arapy when she lived in Paraguay for 2 years.

Returning to Brazil, she had a big success with the single "Tô Nem Aí" co-written by Luka herself, Latino, Lara Tausz and Alessandro Tausz.

== Discography ==
=== Albums ===
Album Title	Album details	Peak chart positions		Sales	Certifications
Album Title	Album details	BRA	Top 40	Sales	Certifications
Porta Aberta	Released: 15 December 2003; Label: Sony Music; Format: Digital download, CD	1	1	World: 1,000,000; BRA: 500,000	BRA: Platinum; AFP: Gold
Sem Resposta	Released: 26 April 2006; Label: Warner Music; Format: Digital download, CD	2	4	BRA: 50,000	
O Próximo Trem	Released: 9 March 2009; Label: Independent; Format: Digital download, CD	—	27	BRA: 5,000	
Céu de Diamantes	Released: 21 August 2015; Label: VideoBes; Format: Digital download, CD	—	—		

=== Singles ===
Year	Single	Peak chart positions							Album
Year	Single	BRA	AUT	NED	SPA	ALE	SWI	ITA	Album
2003	"Tô Nem Aí"	1	46	61	18	76	57	22	Porta Aberta
2003	"Porta Aberta"	1	—	—	—	—	—	—	Porta Aberta
2004	"Difícil Pra Você" (feat. Billy)	7	—	—	—	—	—	—	Porta Aberta
2004	"Te Amaré"	4	—	—	—	—	—	—	Porta Aberta
2004	"Enamorada"	38	—	—	—	10	—	—	—N/a
2006	"Sem Resposta"	11	—	—	—	—	—	—	Sem Resposta
2006	"A Aposta" (feat. Sérgio Moah)	25	—	—	—	—	—	—	Sem Resposta
2006	"Quando Você Passa"	65	—	—	—	—	—	—	Sem Resposta
2009	"Pelo Espelho"	—	—	—	—	—	—	—	O Próximo Trem
2009	"Cinderela Doida"	7	—	—	—	—	—	—	O Próximo Trem
2011	"Love is Free"	—	—	—	—	—	—	—	O Próximo Trem
2014	"Livro Aberto"	—	—	—	—	—	—	—	Céu de Diamantes
2014	"Fala com a Minha Mão"	—	—	—	—	—	—	—	Céu de Diamantes
2017	"Céu de Diamantes"	—	—	—	—	—	—	—	Céu de Diamantes
2018	"Fuego En La Casa"	—	—	—	—	—	—	—	—N/a
2019	"Se Eu Fosse Você"	—	—	—	—	—	—	—	—N/a
2024	"MTG Tô Nem Aí" (with Lukkas and Mc Pretchako)	100	—	—	—	—	—	—	—N/a

=== Promotional singles ===
Year	Título	Album
2007	"Tem Que Ser Diferente"	—N/a
2012	"Você me Olha"	Céu de Diamantes
2015	"Vitaminada"	Céu de Diamantes
2016	"A Vida é Andar, Andar"	Céu de Diamantes
2018	"Te Quiero, Tequila!"	—N/a
2019	"Dia de Maldade"	—N/a
2019	"Vai"	—N/a
2020	"Só Love"	—N/a
2022	"O seu Amigo gosta"	—N/a

== Awards and nominations ==
- 2003: Won "Song of the Year" for "Tô Nem Aí" in Domingão do Faustão
- 2004: Won "Song of the Year" for "Tô Nem Aí" at Sistema Brasileiro de Televisão awards
- 2004: Nominated for "Revelation of the Year" for "Tô Nem Aí" at Sistema Brasileiro de Televisão awards
- 2009: Won second award for "best interpretation" for "Só o que o coração sangrar" at the 23rd edition of Edição da Moenda da Canção
- 2010: Nominated for "Voz e Violão" at the 2nd Troféu MZOTV awards
