= ANDi =

Genetically modified rhesus monkey, b. 2001

ANDi is the first genetically modified rhesus monkey, who was born at Oregon Health Sciences University (OHSU) on October 1, 2001. OHSU named the monkey ANDi because it stands for iDNA spelled backward.

== Birth circumstances ==
ANDi was born with an extra glowing gene called green fluorescent protein (GFP). This GFP gene, which is naturally occurring in jellyfish, was taken from a jellyfish and genetically added to ANDi's DNA sequence through his chromosomes. OHSU used rhesus monkeys because they share 95% of the same genes as humans.

== Genetic modification method ==
During the method in which ANDi was created, 224 eggs were injected with the protein and only 166 or 75% were successfully fertilized. 126 or 76% of these fertilized eggs developed to the four-cell-stage embryos. 40 of the fertilized embryos were implanted in 20 surrogate rhesus mothers, each carrying two embryos. 5 of the surrogates became pregnant. From these five surrogates, three live births proceeded. In these three monkey births, only one infant, ANDi, carried the transgene. Research team leader Gerald Schatten said the technique that created ANDi would become a vital tool for scientists investigating therapies for human diseases.

== Implications ==
By being able to genetically modify a monkey, a new breakthrough in technology was formed. ANDi was created in the hope of finding a cure for complicated human diseases such as cancer. Since ANDi was born, scientists want to introduce more significant DNA changes. Scientists are looking to make genetic modifications such as those that would make primates closely mimic human diseases like breast cancer or HIV. Scientists also want to try to study and cure other diseases through trans genetics such as Alzheimer's, AIDS, and diabetes.

Although ANDi carries the gene, it does not appear to be functional; ANDi does not actually glow.

== See also ==
- List of individual monkeys
- Tetra (monkey)
