= Corporal Jackie =

Baboon in the South African army during World War I

Jackie
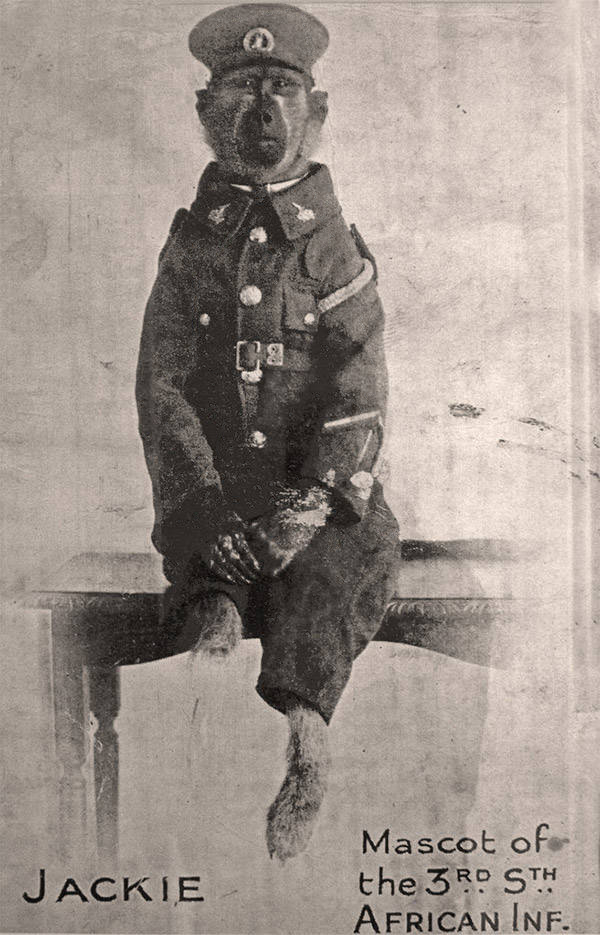
- Corporal Jackie poses for a portrait in his official uniform
- Born: Jackie
- Died: 1921; Union of South Africa
- Military career
- Allegiance: South Africa
- Branch: South African Army
- Service years: 1915–1918
- Rank: Corporal
- Unit: 3rd South African Infantry Regiment
- Conflicts: First World War; Western Front; Battle of the Somme (WIA); North African theatre; Action of Agagia
- Awards: Pretoria Citizens Service Medal

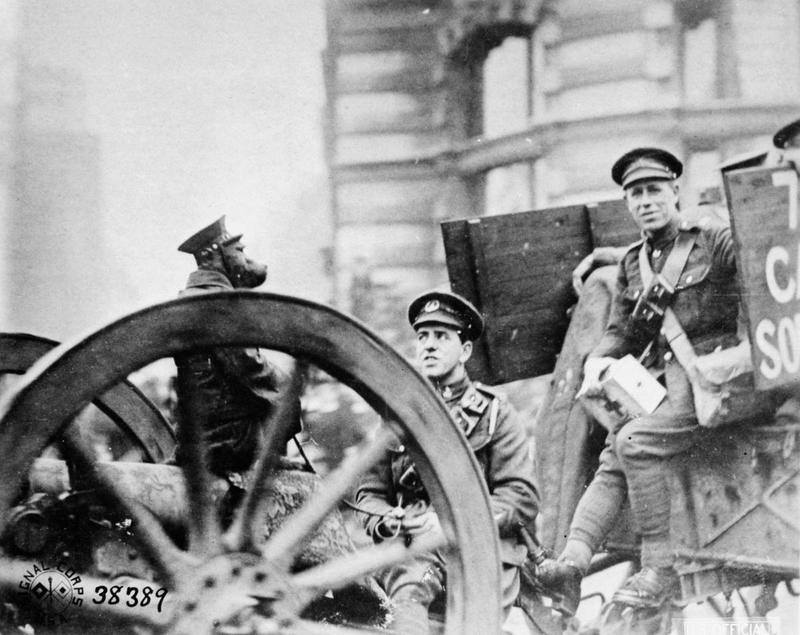
Jackie taking part in the 1918 Lord Mayor's Show, London, England.

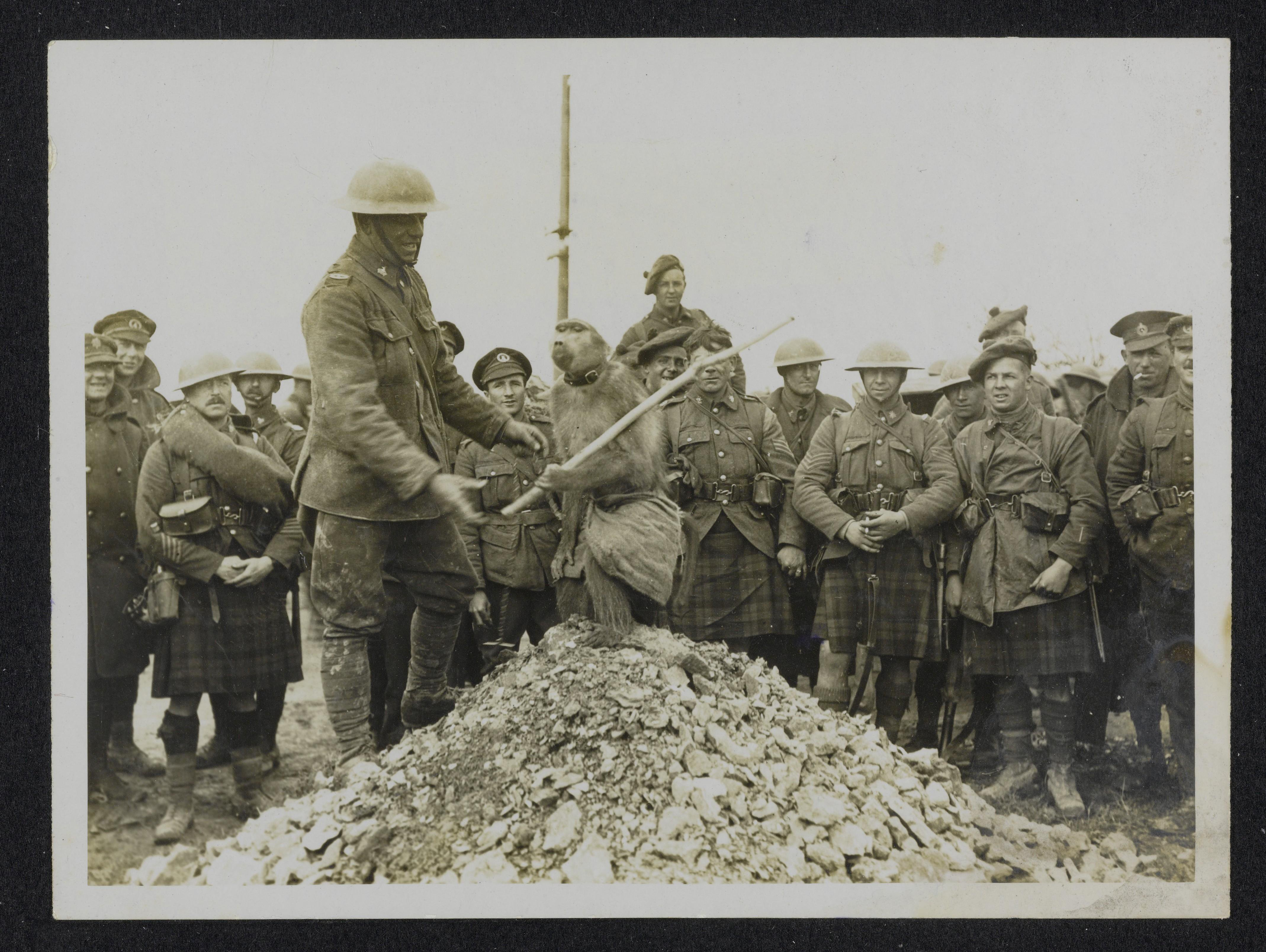
Possibly Jackie with a South African Scottish unit

Corporal Jackie was a chacma baboon in the South African army during World War I. He was made their mascot when his owner was drafted into war, and would not leave Jackie at home. Jackie received various injuries during the war such as having shrapnel lodged in his leg and arm, along with having his right leg blown off. Jackie was trained to salute when he saw a superior officer. After the war, Jackie was given the rank of corporal, and the Pretoria Citizens Service Medal, then he died a year later in a home fire.

== Background ==
Jackie's human story started in the early half of the 1910s when South African Albert Marr found the baboon around his farm. He captured Jackie and began training him to be "a member of the family."

== War ==
Jackie lived a few years in the Marr Farm before World War I broke out. Marr was drafted in 1915, and refused to leave Jackie at home. Marr's commanding officers, to the soldiers' surprise, acquiesced, so Jackie was made a mascot for the 3rd South African Infantry Regiment (Transvaal) and brought everywhere with them. Jackie was given an official-style uniform with a cap, a ration set, and his own paybook. Jackie would salute to superior officers and light soldiers' cigarettes. He would even stand at ease in the style of a trained soldier. Due to his heightened senses, Jackie was useful to sentries on duty at night. The baboon would be the first to know when an attack was coming or enemy soldiers were moving around nearby.

Jackie and Marr survived a battle where the casualty rate was 80 percent, in Delville Wood, early in the Somme Campaign.

When Marr was serving in Egypt he was shot in the shoulder at the Battle of Agagia, 26 February 1916, while Jackie was with him, licking the wound as they awaited help.

Jackie was given his own rations while with the army and ate them with his own knife and fork, as well as his own washing basin. When the regiment was drilled and marched, Jackie would be with them.

Jackie spent time in the trenches in France where he tried to build a wall around himself during extreme enemy fire, but a piece of shrapnel from an explosion flew over the wall hitting Jackie in the leg and arm. When stretcher bearers tried to take Jackie away he refused, desperate to finish his wall and hide. Doctors treated Jackie's wounds, but they decided his leg had to be amputated and were surprised that he even survived.

Jackie was awarded a medal of valor for the event of his injuries and promoted from private to corporal. After the war was over, Jackie was discharged with papers at the Maitland Dispersal Camp in Cape Town. Jackie was not the only baboon made part of the South African army, but he was the only baboon to achieve the rank of private or higher.

== Return to South Africa ==
After the war, Marr brought Jackie back to South Africa, but Corporal Jackie, died due to a fire a year later in May 1921. Marr died, aged 84, in 1973.

== See also ==
- List of individual monkeys
