= 3rd South African Infantry Regiment =

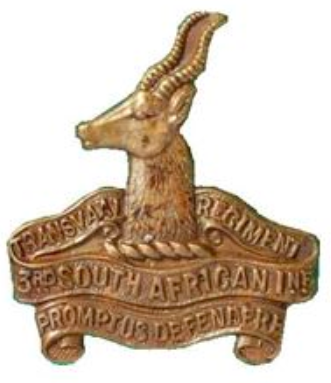
- Collar badge of the regiment
- Active: 1915–1918
- Country: Union of South Africa Southern Rhodesia
- Allegiance: United Kingdom
- Branch: Army
- Size: Battalion
- Part of: 1st South African Infantry Brigade
- Engagements: World War I

Insignia
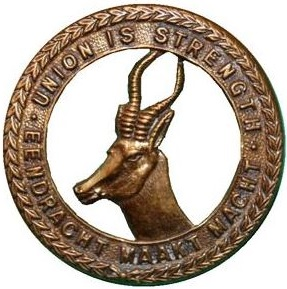
- Cap badge of the 1st SA Infantry Brigade
- Shoulder badge: Shoulder badge of brigade with '3'

The 3rd South African Infantry Regiment (3 SAI) was an infantry regiment of the South African Overseas Expeditionary Force during the First World War.

== History ==
=== Formation ===
The infantry regiments were raised with men from the four provinces of the Union: the 3rd Regiment troops were from the Transvaal and the then Rhodesia. Many volunteers for the B Company originated from the Witwatersrand Rifles Regiment while C Company were men from the Rand Light Infantry. Most of the recruits already had military training or experience. They were, in general, middle class, well-educated and well-bred men.

It was commanded by Lieutenant Colonel E.F. Thackeray.

The regiment was led by serving officers of the Union Defence Force, while the whole of 1st South African Brigade part of the South African Overseas Expeditionary Force coming under the command of Brigadier-General Henry Lukin DSO, a previous Inspector General of the UDF. The Brigade was attached to the 9th (Scottish) Division.

=== Engagements ===
After formation, the 3rd Regiment departed Cape Town on a number of ships between 28 August and 17 September 1915 and sailed for Great Britain. Once disembarked, they travelled to their new base at Bordon Camp in Hampshire. Here they began three months of training to bring them up to combat readiness with the expectation then being they would enter the fighting in France at some point in early 1916.

However, their orders were changed at short notice towards the end of their training and on 30 December 1915 they boarded ships in Devonport and sailed for Egypt. Here they would take part in Senussi Campaign, fighting in the action of Agagia where 14 men died.

After their deployment in Egypt, the 3rd Regiment was deployed to France where it helped capture the village of Longueval and was deployed in the adjacent Delville Wood on 15 July 1916. The regiment then served with the Brigade at Arras during April 1917 and was part of the offensive at Ypres and Passchendale in September 1917. It was disbanded on 18 February 1918 due to a shortage of recruits.

== Regimental emblems ==
=== Dress Insignia ===
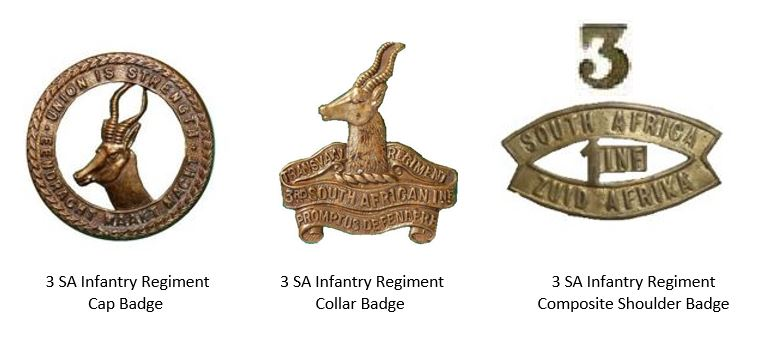
3 SA Infantry Regiment Insignia

== See also ==
- Corporal Jackie
