= Loon (monkey) =

Drill in the San Diego Zoo

Loon (September 16, 1979 – June 17, 2003) was a drill in the San Diego Zoo. He was trained to accept regular blood sampling and insulin injection in order to treat his diabetes mellitus.

== Life ==
Loon having blood drawn from his arm.

Loon was born in the Philadelphia Zoo in 1979, and transferred to the San Diego Zoo in 1982. He was named "Loon" because of his vocalizations.

In June 1989, Loon began rapidly losing weight, and in July of that year he was diagnosed with diabetes. Treatment began immediately, with multiple daily blood draws and insulin injections; however, this led Loon to become extremely aggressive, and the zoo was forced to restrain him in a small cage, and to sedate him before procedures. As a result, he developed neurotic and stereotyped behavior, which decreased his quality of life so much that euthanasia was considered.

With the help of a former SeaWorld animal trainer, zoo personnel used operant conditioning techniques so that Loon would associate venipuncture and other medical procedures with rewards such as getting fed or groomed. He subsequently learned to participate in getting himself weighed, and to provide daily urine samples by "go[ing] potty" on command.

Loon eventually became a role model for human children with diabetes who were likewise reluctant to receive multiple injections, and the techniques which had been used to train him were adapted by other institutions to train their animals to accede to medical procedures.

== Legacy ==
Samples of Loon's tissues have been cryopreserved in a frozen zoo. Due to physical consequences of his diabetes, Loon was unable to breed naturally; however, his semen was assigned to the Columbus Zoo, where female drills are available for artificial insemination. As well, he was one of the first two animals of an endangered species to have his tissue samples used to make induced pluripotent stem cells as an attempt at conservation.

== See also ==
- List of individual monkeys
