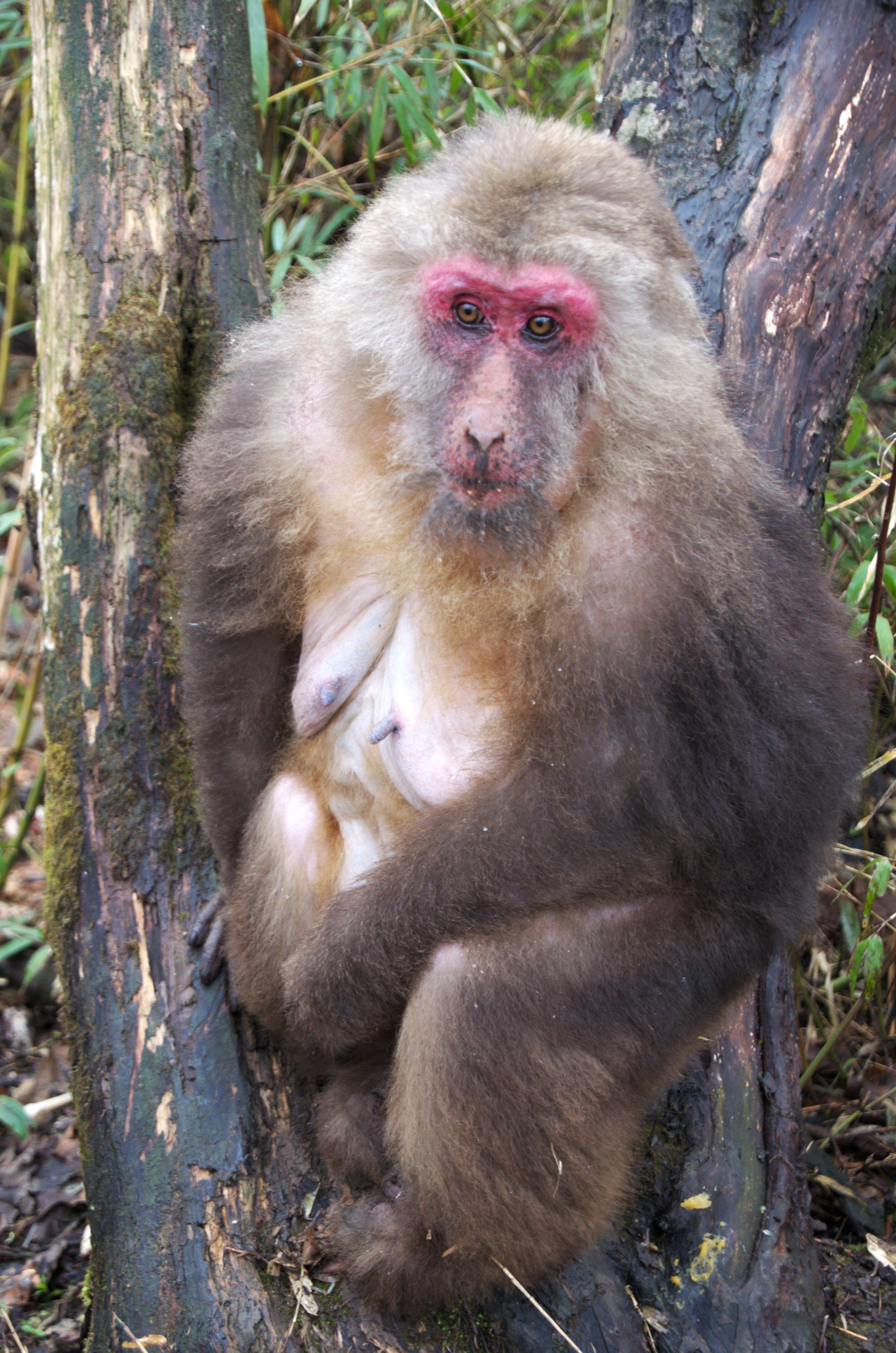
- An elderly female on Mount Emei, Sichuan, China

Conservation status
- Near Threatened (IUCN 3.1)

Scientific classification
- Kingdom: Animalia
- Phylum: Chordata
- Class: Mammalia
- Order: Primates
- Suborder: Haplorhini
- Family: Cercopithecidae
- Genus: Macaca
- Species: M. thibetana

Binomial name
- Macaca thibetana (A. Milne-Edwards, 1870)
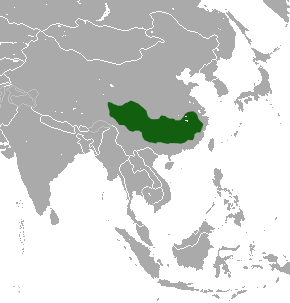
- Tibetan macaque range

= Tibetan macaque =

Species of Old World monkey

The Tibetan macaque (Macaca thibetana), also known as Père David's Macaque, the Chinese stump-tailed macaque or Milne-Edwards' macaque, is a macaque species found from eastern Tibet east to Guangdong and north to Shaanxi in China. It has also been reported in northeastern India. This species lives in subtropical forests (mixed deciduous to evergreen) at elevations from 800 to 2,500 m (2,600 to 8,200 ft) above sea level.

== Taxonomy ==
There are four recognized subspecies:

- M. t. thibetana
- M. t. esau
- M. t. guiahouensis
- M. t. huangshanensis

== Physical description ==
The Tibetan macaque is the largest species of macaque and one of the largest monkeys found in Asia. Only the proboscis monkey and the larger species of gray langur are bigger in-size among Asian monkeys. Males are the larger sex, commonly attaining a weight of 13 to 19.5 kg (29 to 43 lb) and length of 61 to 71 cm (24 to 28 in) long, with a maximum record weight of 30 kg (66 lb). Females, in contrast, weigh 9 to 13 kg (20 to 29 lb) and measure 49 to 63 cm (19 to 25 in) long. The stump-like tail adds only 4 to 14 cm (1.6 to 5.5 in), with females having a considerably shorter tail. The fur is well-suited to the species' cold environments, being long, dense and brown on the back, with creamy-buff to grey coloration on the underparts. Some adults are quite dark brown on the back, while others are a sandy yellowish-brown color. They have a prominent, pale-buff beard and long whiskers, but have a relatively hairless face. The face is pale pinkish in males but is a more vivid, reddish-pink in females. The infants have silver-and-black fur that changes to its adult color at the age of two.

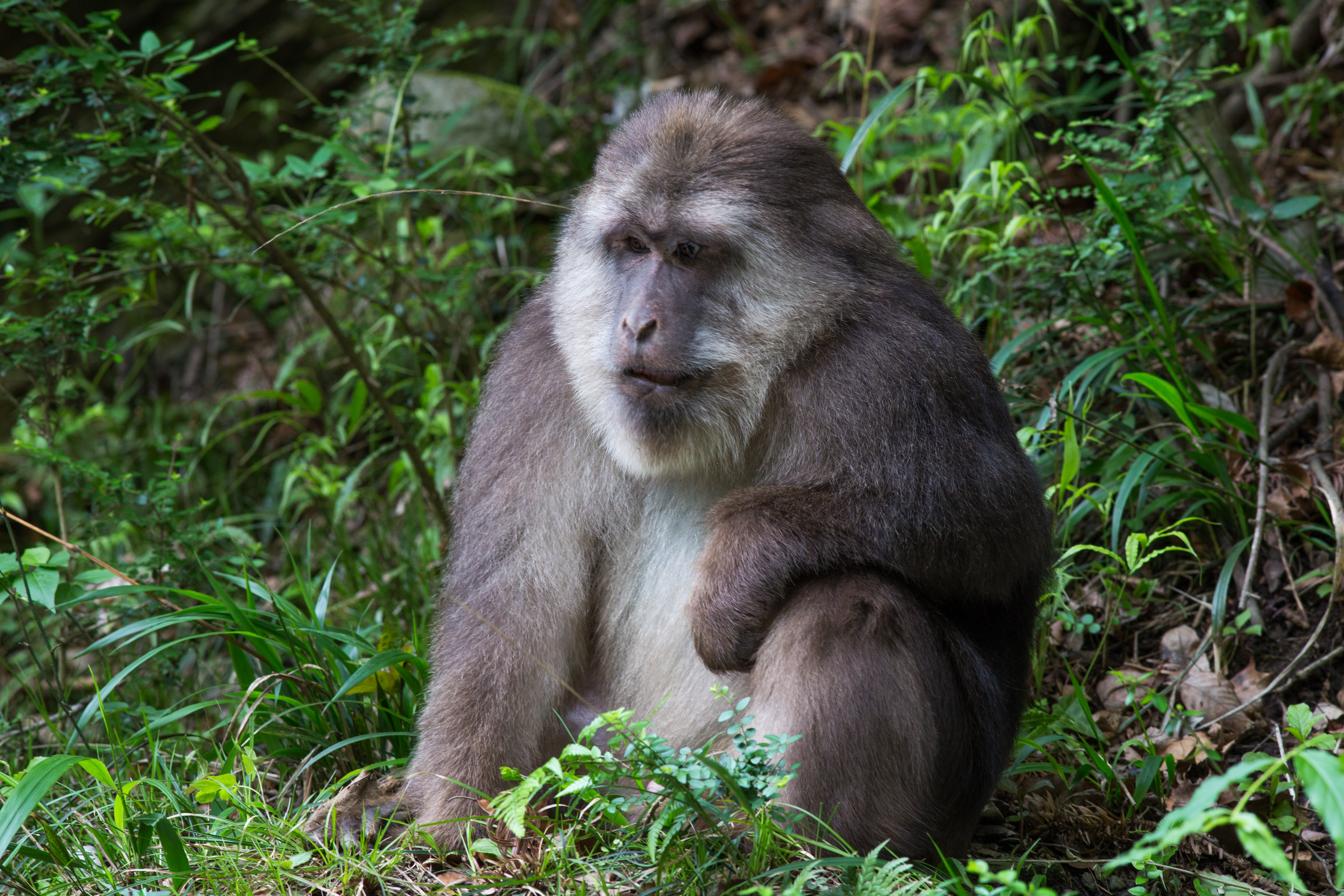
Male Tibetan macaque.

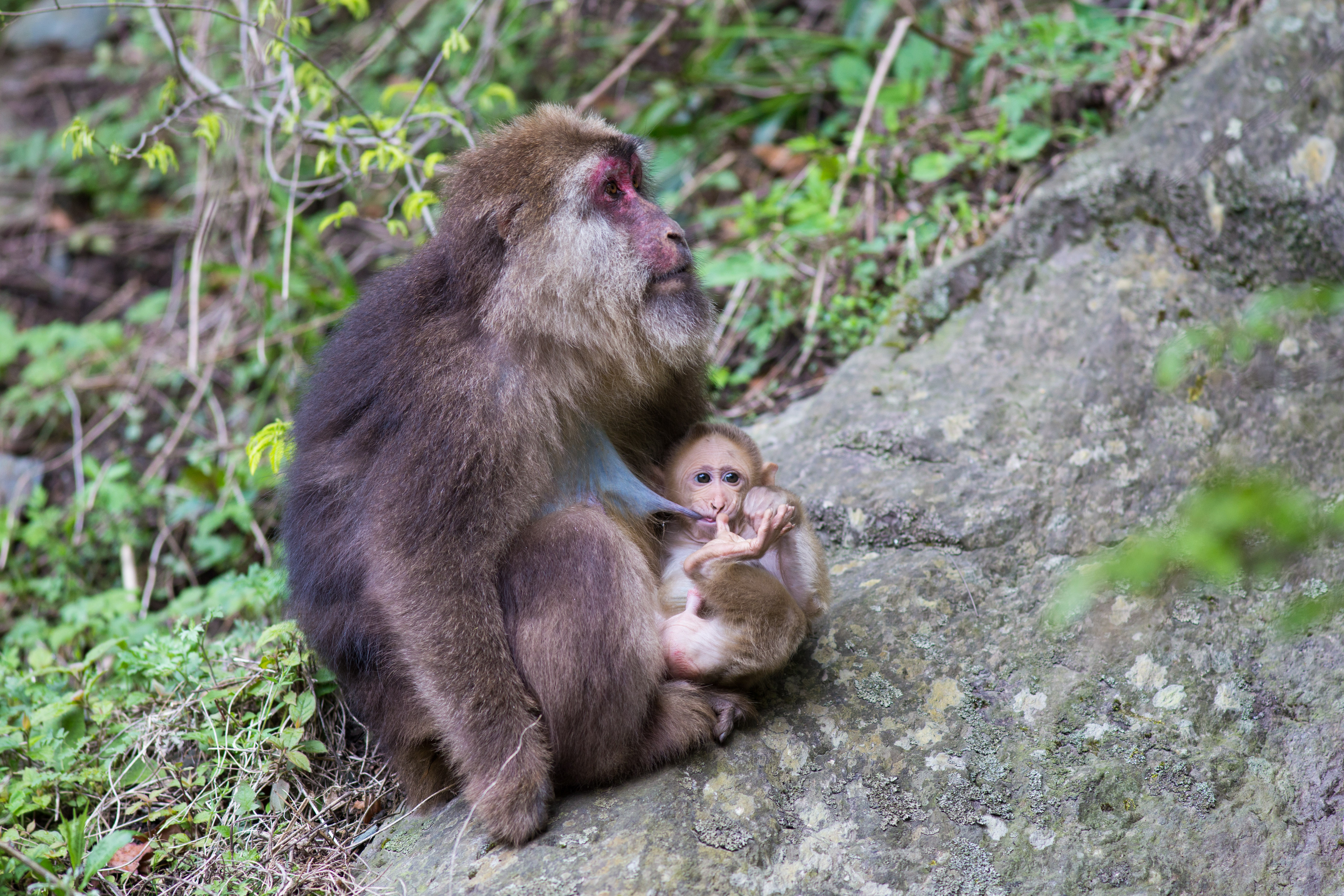
Female Tibetan macaque nursing infant.

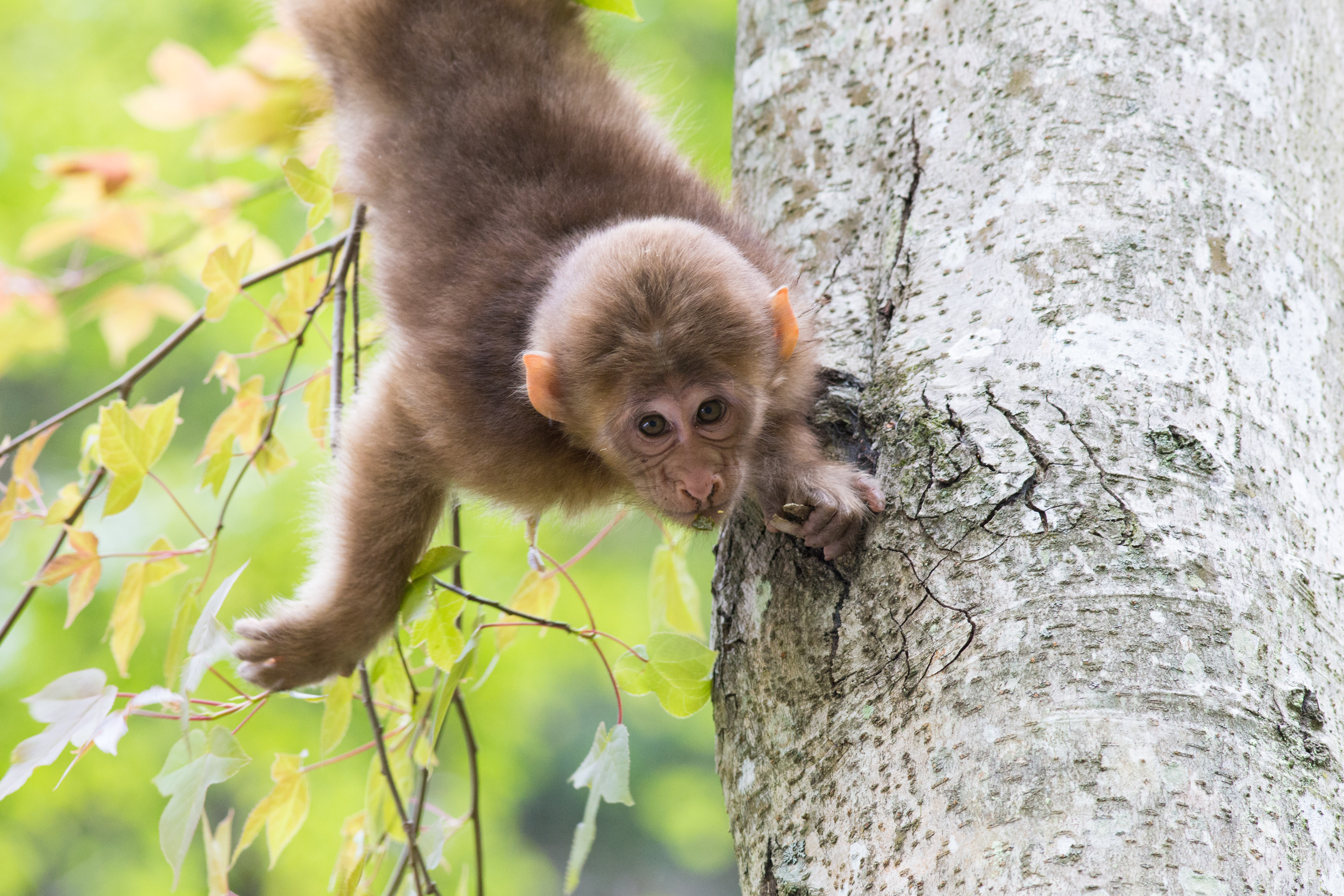
Young Tibetan macaque.

== Behaviour ==
The Tibetan macaque lives in mixed sex groups. In their complex social system, females remain for life in their natal group, but males disperse shortly after their adolescence (at about 8 years old). Macaque societies are hierarchical, with higher-ranking males getting better access to the resources, namely food and sexually-receptive females. Alpha males dominate the group, being those that are typically large, strong and newly mature. As they age, males tend to gradually lose their social standing and are frequently subject to challenges for dominance from other males. Such conflicts are frequently quite violent and males may kill each other in battle. Studies of Tibetan macaques at Mount Emei and Huangshan Mountains, found the average tenure for an alpha male only lasted about one year. When troop size becomes quite large (in the 40 to 50 range) and competition grows over increasingly stretched resources, some individuals (males, females and juveniles) split from the main group to form a new, smaller group, known as 'fissioning', and move on to a different home range. Usually, it is the lowest-ranking individuals that will split from the main group.

Females first breed at around five years of age. The gestation period is six months with a single offspring being produced at each pregnancy. Most infants being born in January and February. Young macaques are nursed for a year and may continue to do so longer if the female does not give birth again the following year. Males of the group may also be involved in alloparental care.

This diurnal species spends most of its time on the ground, where it forages for leaves, fruit, grass and, to a lesser extent, flowers, seeds, roots and insects. When available, bamboo shoots, fruits and leaves are particularly favoured.

== Conservation ==
This species is classified as Near Threatened by the IUCN and is listed on Appendix II of the CITES list. Its main threats are all human-related. Principally, they are sensitive to habitat destruction, as they are tied closely to the forest. They are occasionally poisoned by herbicides and pesticides while eating and may catch diseases transmitted from humans. Illegal poaching may occur, with the flesh and the fur of the macaque being used.

== Popular culture ==
Xing Xing, a free-ranging, one-armed Tibetan macaque, has garnered considerable online fame for her visits to Yanghu Temple in Ninghai County, China, where she is cared for by an elder nun named Ye Liannu.
