= Latino (singer) =

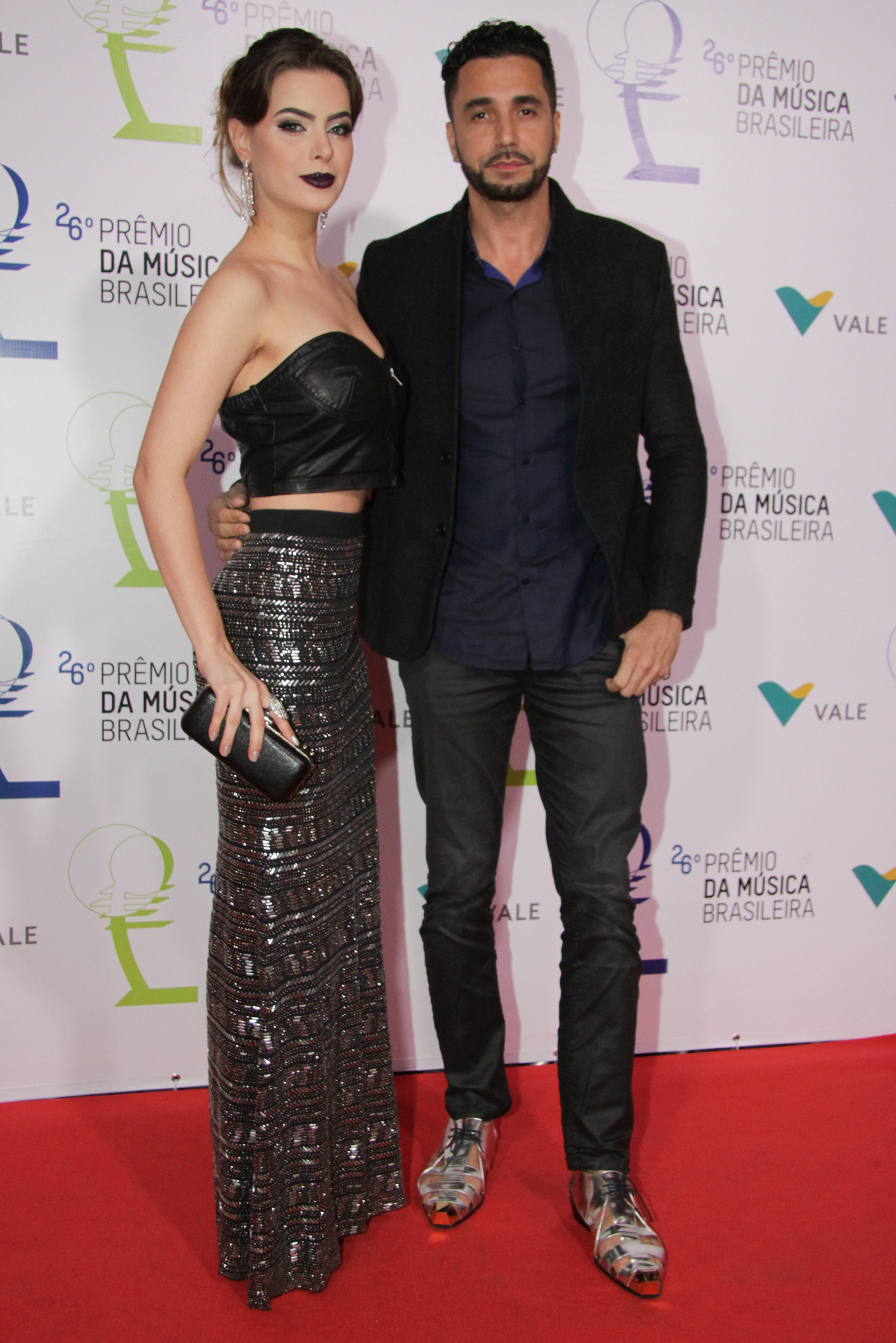
- Rayanne Morais and Latino at the 2015 Brazilian Music Awards

Background information
- Born: Roberto de Souza Rocha; February 2, 1973 (age 53); Rio de Janeiro, Brazil
- Genres: Pop; freestyle; funk melody
- Occupations: Singer; songwriter
- Instruments: Vocals; guitar
- Years active: 1992–present
- Labels: Sony Music; EMI
- Website: latino.com.br

Roberto de Souza Rocha (born February 2, 1973), also known by the stage name Latino, is a Brazilian recording artist and entertainer. Latino has sold more than four million albums along his career.

== Biography ==
Rocha was born in Rio de Janeiro, Brazil. In 1988 he moved to the United States, where his mother was living with his stepfather. Rocha stayed there for four years, working as barman, magician, cook, dancer and even as waiter. He was also roadie for David Copperfield, and started performing in bars and nightclubs. Being repeatedly referred as a "Latin Boy" at work, Rocha decided to use "Latino" as his stage name.

After going back to Brazil, Latino started his artistic career in 1994, recording his first CD Marcas de Amor. The tracks "Me Leva" and "Só Você" attracted attention owing to their dance rhythm. The album sold over 100 thousand copies and certified gold.

His next album was Aventureiro resulting in singles "Eu Amo Você" and "Louca". In 1997, he ventured into Spanish releasing a Spanish CD version of his album in Mexico. 1998 saw release of "Vitrine", a big radio hit. In 1999, he released Latino 2000 with the resulting single "Solidão é Demais".

At this point, Latino started to get flak in the media for the emptiness of his lyrics, and was shunned by other artists, who made music satirizing him. With the 2000s, Latino started producing some artists and becoming host of TV program Sábado Show on Rede TV. "Tô Nem Aí" ('I Don't Care'), co-written by Latino and Luka, became a No. 1 hit in Brazil and Portugal, and appeared on European charts in Italy, Germany, Spain and other countries. He was cover model in G Magazine in July 2000.

Xeque Mate came in 2003. The songs on the playlist, such as "Você Já Foi Mais Humilde" ('You Used To Be More Humble'), "Cartão Vermelho" ('Red Card') and "Medo Meu" ('My Fear') portrayed the biography of his last and enduring relationship. In 2003, Latino had a cameo appearance in Kubanacan, a Rede Globo television soap opera. In the same year he released his first live CD: Latino Ao Vivo – 10 Anos de Sucessos. It was produced by Up In The Air Produções, distributed by Som Livre (Globo TV Organization record company) and joined all the greatest hits of his career. "Me Leva", "Não Adianta Chorar" ("There's No Use Crying"), "Só Você" and "Eu Amo Você", are some of them.

Despite his successful career, Latino's practice of taking hits from other countries and re-recording them has been met with wide criticism from the musical community in Brazil, mostly because his lyrics have no relation whatsoever to the original music.

On September 17, 2012, Latino posted in his YouTube channel a video containing a Brazilian version of the Korean hit "Gangnam Style" with the name "Despedida de Solteiro (Laçar, Puxar, Beijar)". After it, YouTube closed Latino's account, with more than 100,000 dislikes on his video and numerous complaints from users saying that the song was plagiarized and spoils the original version.

== Monkey ==
In February 2014 the singer was given a robust capuchin monkey as a wedding present by a businessman who worked with Latino. He named the monkey Twelves. The name Twelves was a tribute to the singer's fascination with the number 12, and because Twelves was born on "12/12/12".

On March 17, 2016, Latino posted a photo showing Twelves on his shoulder as he placed a hookah's hose to the monkey's mouth. The caption read: "Even Twelves wants to take a gangster-style photo". This caused controversy, with many followers criticizing his behavior. The post was deleted after the negative reaction, but the criticism continued.

== Sampled and covered songs ==
Latino sampled Earth, Wind & Fire's song "Let's Groove" in his song "Provoca", he also sampled Backstreet Boys’ song "All I Have To Give" in his song "Solidão É Demais", Evelyn "Champagne" King's "Shame" in his song "Divinas", and his secondary sample of P.M. Dawn's "Set Adrift on Memory Bliss" (from original song True by Spandau Ballet) in his song "Carta Canção", from the album Latino 2000.

His song "Festa no Apê" is a remix of "Dragostea Din Tei", from the Moldavian band O-Zone. The song "Sem Noção" is a remix of "Chacarron" from the singer El Chombo.

== Discography ==
=== Studio albums ===
- Marcas de Amor (1994)
- Aventureiro (1996)
- Latino (1997)
- Latino 2000 (1999)
- Xeque Mate (2002)
- Latino Apresenta as Aventuras do DJ L (2004)
- Latino Apresenta as Novas Aventuras de DJ L (2005)
- Sem Noção (2007)
- Junto e Misturado (2008)
- James Bom de Cama (2014)
- Soy Latino (2015)
