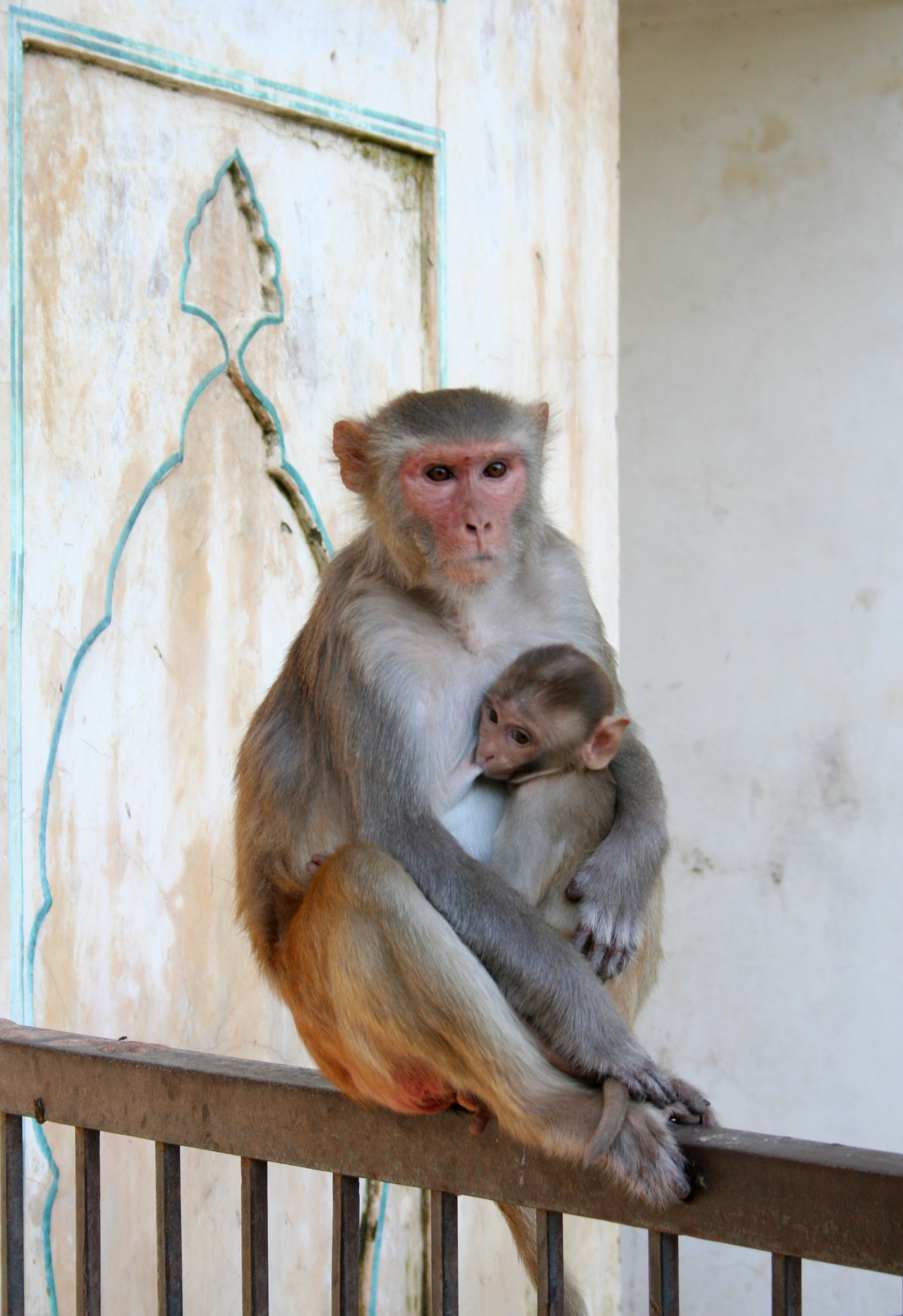
- Female with infant in Galtaji, India

Conservation status
- Least Concern (IUCN 3.1)

Scientific classification
- Kingdom: Animalia
- Phylum: Chordata
- Class: Mammalia
- Order: Primates
- Family: Cercopithecidae
- Genus: Macaca
- Species: M. mulatta

Binomial name
- Macaca mulatta (Zimmermann, 1780)
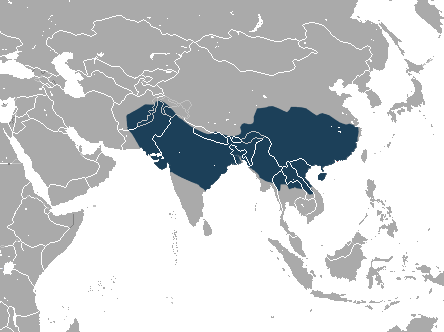
- Rhesus macaque native range

Synonyms
- Species synonymy: Simia fulvus (Kerr, 1792); Simia rhesus Audebert, 1798; Simia erythraea Shaw, 1800; Macaca nipalensis Hodgson, 1840; Macaca oinops Hodgson, 1840; Inuus sanctijohannis R. Swinhoe, 1866; Inuus sancti-johannis R. Swinhoe, 1866; Macacus lasiotus Gray, 1868; Macacus tcheliensis A. Milne-Edwards, 1872; Macacus vestitus A. Milne-Edwards, 1892; Macacus rhesus villosus True, 1894; Pithecus littoralis Elliot, 1909; Macaca siamica Kloss, 1917; Macaca mulatta mcmahoni Pocock, 1932

= Rhesus macaque =

- Male in Longhu Mountain Natural Reserve, Guangxi, China

Species of Old World monkey

The rhesus macaque (Macaca mulatta), colloquially rhesus monkey, is a species of Old World monkey in the Macaca genus. There are between six and nine recognised subspecies split between two groups, the Chinese-derived and the Indian-derived. Generally brown or grey in colour, it is 47–53 cm (19–21 in) in length with a 20.7–22.9 cm (8.1–9.0 in) tail and weighs 5.3–7.7 kg (12–17 lb). It is native to South, Central, and Southeast Asia and has the widest geographic range of all non-human primates, occupying a great diversity of altitudes and habitats.

The rhesus macaque is diurnal, arboreal, and terrestrial. It is mostly herbivorous, feeding mainly on fruit, but also eating seeds, roots, buds, bark, and cereals. Rhesus macaques living in cities also eat human food and trash. They are gregarious, with troops comprising 20–200 individuals. The social groups are matrilineal. Individuals communicate with a variety of facial expressions, vocalisations, body postures, and gestures.

As a result of the rhesus macaque's relatively easy upkeep, wide availability, and closeness to humans anatomically and physiologically, it has been used extensively in medical and biological research. It has facilitated many scientific breakthroughs including vaccines for rabies, smallpox, polio, and antiretroviral medication to treat HIV/AIDS. A rhesus macaque became the first primate astronaut in 1948.

The rhesus is listed as Least Concern in the IUCN Red List.

== Etymology ==
The name "rhesus" is reminiscent of the mythological king Rhesus of Thrace, a minor character in the Iliad. However, the French naturalist Jean-Baptiste Audebert who named the species, stated: "it has no meaning". The rhesus macaque is also known colloquially as the "rhesus monkey".

== Taxonomy ==
The rhesus macaque was first described by Eberhard August Wilhelm von Zimmermann in 1780 who proposed the name Cercopithecus mulatta. It was subordinated to the genus Macaca by Martin Hinton and Robert Charles Wroughton in 1921.

The nominate subspecies M. m. mulatta includes the morphologically similar M. rhesus villosus described by Frederick W. True in 1894 based on a specimen from Kashmir, and M. m. mcmahoni by Reginald Innes Pocock in 1932 which was a specimen collected in Kootai, Pakistan. Several rhesus macaque subspecies were proposed between 1868 and 1917:

- M. m. lasiota (Gray, 1868), the west Chinese rhesus macaque, is distributed in the west of Sichuan, northwest of Yunnan, and southeast of Qinghai; it is possibly synonymous with M. m. sanctijohannis (R. Swinhoe, 1867), if not with M. m. mulatta.
- M. m. tcheliensis (Milne-Edwards, 1870), the north Chinese rhesus macaque, lives in the north of Henan, south of Shanxi, and near Beijing. Others consider it possibly synonymous with M. m. sanctijohannis, if not with M. m. mulatta.
- M. m. vestita (Milne-Edwards, 1892), the Tibetan rhesus macaque, lives in the southeast of Tibet, northwest of Yunnan (Deqing), and perhaps including Yushu; it is possibly synonymous with M. m. sanctijohannis, if not with M. m. mulatta.
- M. m. littoralis (Elliot, 1909), the south Chinese rhesus macaque, lives in Fujian, Zhejiang, Anhui, Jiangxi, Hunan, Hubei, Guizhou, northwest of Guangdong, north of Guangxi, northeast of Yunnan, east of Sichuan, and south of Shaanxi; it is possibly synonymous with M. m. sanctijohannis, if not with M. m. mulatta.
- M. m. brevicaudus, also referred to as Pithecus brevicaudus (Elliot, 1913), lives on the Hainan Island and Wanshan Islands in Guangdong, and the islands near Hong Kong; it may be synonymous with M. m. mulatta.
- M. m. siamica (Kloss, 1917), the Indochinese rhesus macaque, is distributed in Myanmar, in the north of Thailand and Vietnam, in Laos, and in the Chinese provinces of Anhui, northwest Guangxi, Guizhou, Hubei, Hunan, central and eastern Sichuan, and western and south-central Yunnan; possibly synonymous with M. m. sanctijohannis, if not with M. m. mulatta.

== Description ==
3d model of skeleton

3d model of brain surface

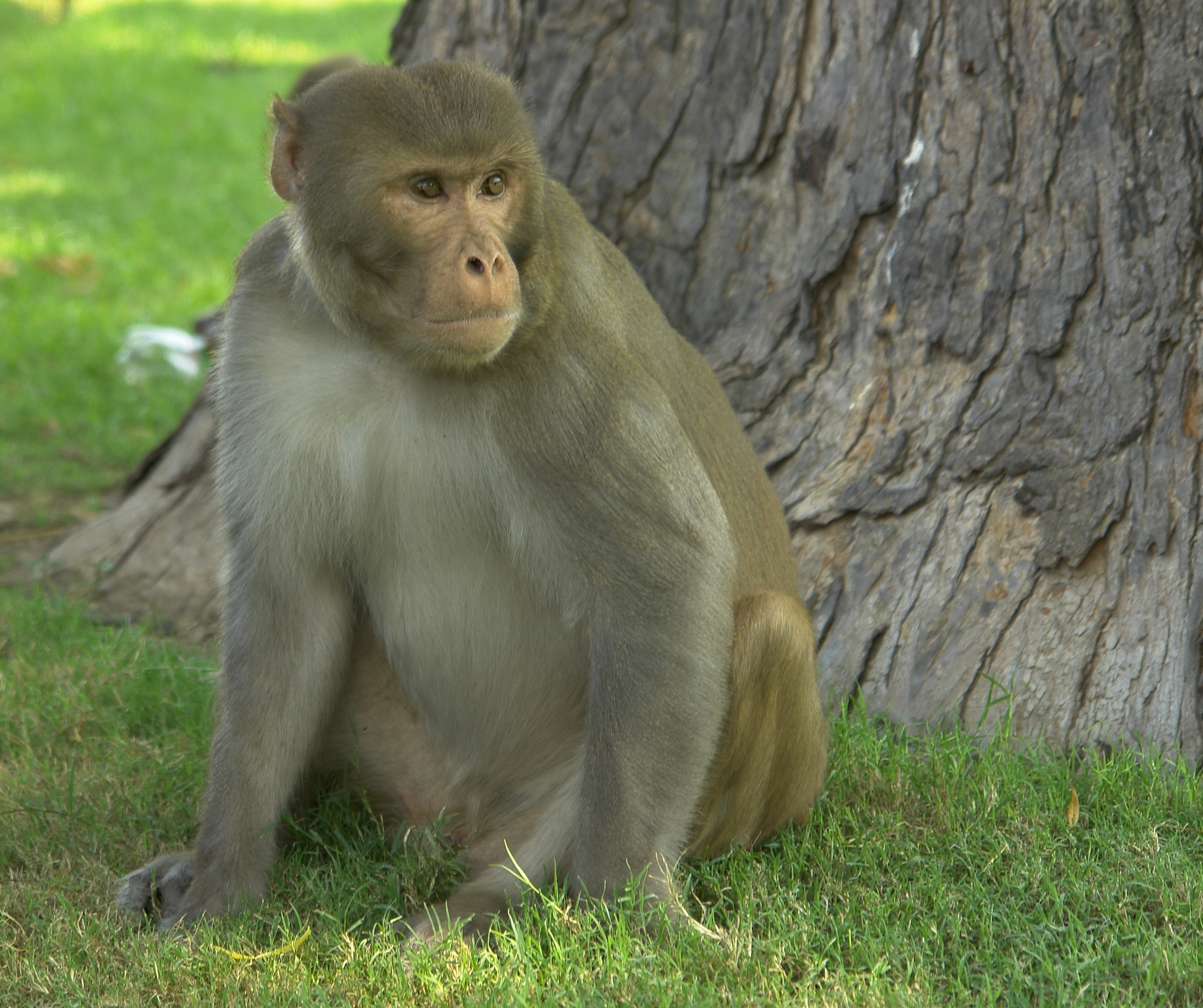
Male at Agra Fort, Uttar Pradesh

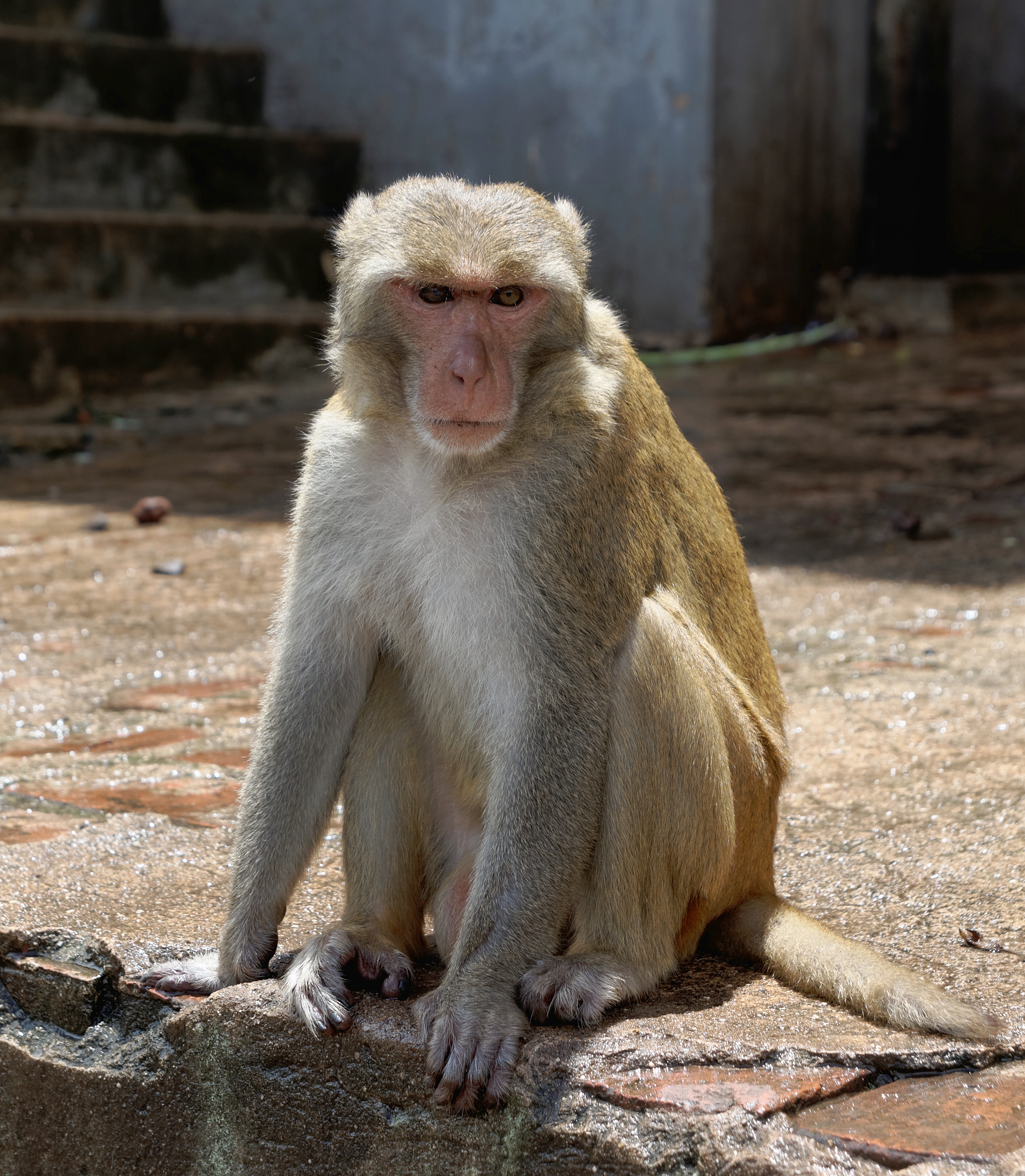
Male at Mount Popa, Myanmar

The rhesus macaque is brown or grey in color and has a pink face, which is bereft of fur. It has, on average, 50 vertebrae and a wide rib cage. Its tail averages between 20.7 and 22.9 cm (8.1 and 9.0 in). Adult males measure about 53 cm (21 in) on average and weigh about 7.7 kg (17 lb). Females are smaller, averaging 47 cm (19 in) in length and 5.3 kg (12 lb) in weight. The ratio of arm length to leg length is 89.6–94.3%.

The rhesus macaque has a dental formula of 2.1.2.32.1.2.3 × 2 = 32 and bilophodont molar teeth.

== Distribution and habitat ==
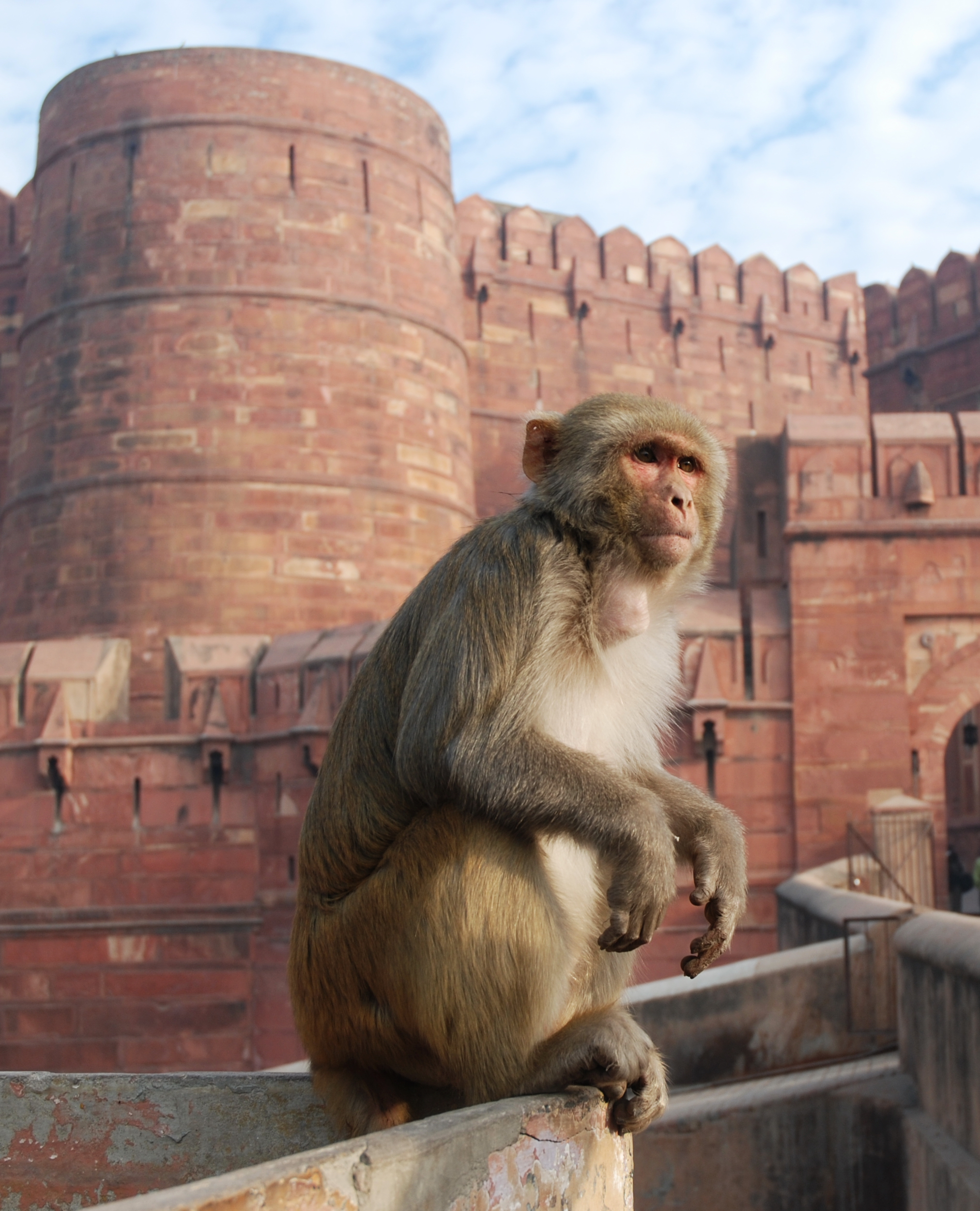
At the Agra Fort in Uttar Pradesh, India

The Rhesus macaque is native to India, Bangladesh, Pakistan, Nepal, Myanmar, Thailand, Afghanistan, Laos, Bhutan, Vietnam and southern China. It has the widest geographic range of any non-human primate throughout Central, South, and Southeast Asia, inhabiting a great diversity of arid and open areas, grasslands, woodlands, and in mountainous regions up to 2,500 m (8,200 ft) in elevation. It lives in patches of forest within agricultural areas, which provide access to agricultural habitats. In India, it has been sighted in all habitats except semi-evergreen forests.

The southern and the northern distributional limits for rhesus and bonnet macaques, respectively, currently run parallel to each other in the western part of India, are separated by a large gap in the center, and converge on the eastern coast of the peninsula to form a distribution overlap zone. This overlap region is characterized by the presence of mixed-species troops, with pure troops of both species sometimes occurring even in close proximity to one another. The range extension of rhesus macaque – a natural process in some areas, and a direct consequence of introduction by humans in other regions – poses grave implications for the endemic and declining populations of bonnet macaques in southern India.

=== Fossil record ===
Fossilized isolated teeth and mandible fragments from Tianyuan Cave and a juvenile maxilla from Wanglaopu Cave near Zhoukoudian represent the first recognized occurrence of rhesus macaque fossils in the far north of China, and thus the population of rhesus macaques which lived around Beijing decades ago is believed to have originated from Pleistocene ancestors rather than being human-introduced. Fossil mandible fragments from the Taedong River Basin around Pyongyang, North Korea, have also been assigned to this species.

=== Exogenous colonies ===
Rhesus macaques have also been introduced and acclimated to other areas, such as the United States, where they are considered an invasive species. In spring 1938, a colony of rhesus macaques was released in and around Silver Springs in Florida by a tour boat operator known locally as "Colonel Tooey" to enhance his "Jungle Cruise". Tooey had been hoping to profit from the boom in jungle adventure stories in film and print media, buying the monkeys to be attractions at his river boat tour. Tooey apparently hadn't been aware of rhesus macaques being proficient swimmers, meaning his original plan to keep the monkeys isolated to an island inside the river didn't work. The macaques nevertheless remained in the region thanks to daily feedings by Tooey and the boat tours. Tooey subsequently released additional monkeys to add to the gene pool and avoid inbreeding. The traditional story that the monkeys were released for scenery enhancement in the Tarzan movies that were filmed at that location is false, as the only Tarzan movie filmed in the area, 1939's Tarzan Finds a Son!, does not contain rhesus macaques. Whilst this was the first colony established and the longest lasting, other colonies have since been established intentionally or accidentally. A population in Titusville, Florida, was featured at the now defunct Tropical Wonderland theme park, which coincidentally was at one time endorsed by Johnny Weissmuller, who had portrayed Tarzan in the aforementioned films. This association might have contributed to the misconception the monkeys were associated directly with the Tarzan films. This colony either escaped or was intentionally released, roaming the woods of the area for a decade. In the 1980s a trapper captured several monkeys from the Titusville population and released them in the Silver Springs area to join that population. The last printed records of monkeys in the Titusville area occurred in early 1990s, but sightings continue to this day.

Various colonies of rhesus macaque are speculated to be the result of zoos and wildlife parks destroyed in hurricanes, most notably Hurricane Andrew. A 2020 estimate put the number at 550–600 rhesus macaques living in the state; officials have caught more than 1,000 of the monkeys in the past decade. Most of the captured monkeys tested positive for herpes B virus, which leads wildlife officials to consider the animals a public health hazard.

Despite the risks, the macaques have continued to enjoy long-standing support from residents in Florida, strongly disagreeing with their removal. The Silver Springs colony has continued to grow in size and range, being commonly sighted in both the park grounds, the nearby city of Ocala, Florida, and the neighboring Ocala National Forest. Individuals likely originating from this colony have been seen hundreds of kilometers away, in St. Augustine, Florida and St. Petersburg, Florida. One infamous individual, named the "Mystery Monkey of Tampa Bay", evaded capture for years, inspiring social media posts and a song.

Exogenous colonies have also resulted from research activities. There is a colony of rhesus macaques on Morgan Island, one of the Sea Islands in the South Carolina Lowcountry. They were imported in the 1970s for use in the local labs. Another research colony was established by the Caribbean Primate Research Center of the University of Puerto Rico on the island of Cayo Santiago, off of Puerto Rico. There are no predators on the island, and humans are not permitted to land, except as part of the research program. Another Puerto Rico research colony was released into the Desecheo National Wildlife Refuge in 1966. As of 2022 they are continuing to do ecological harm, damage crops amounting to $300,000/year and cost $1,000,000/year to manage.

== Ecology and behavior ==
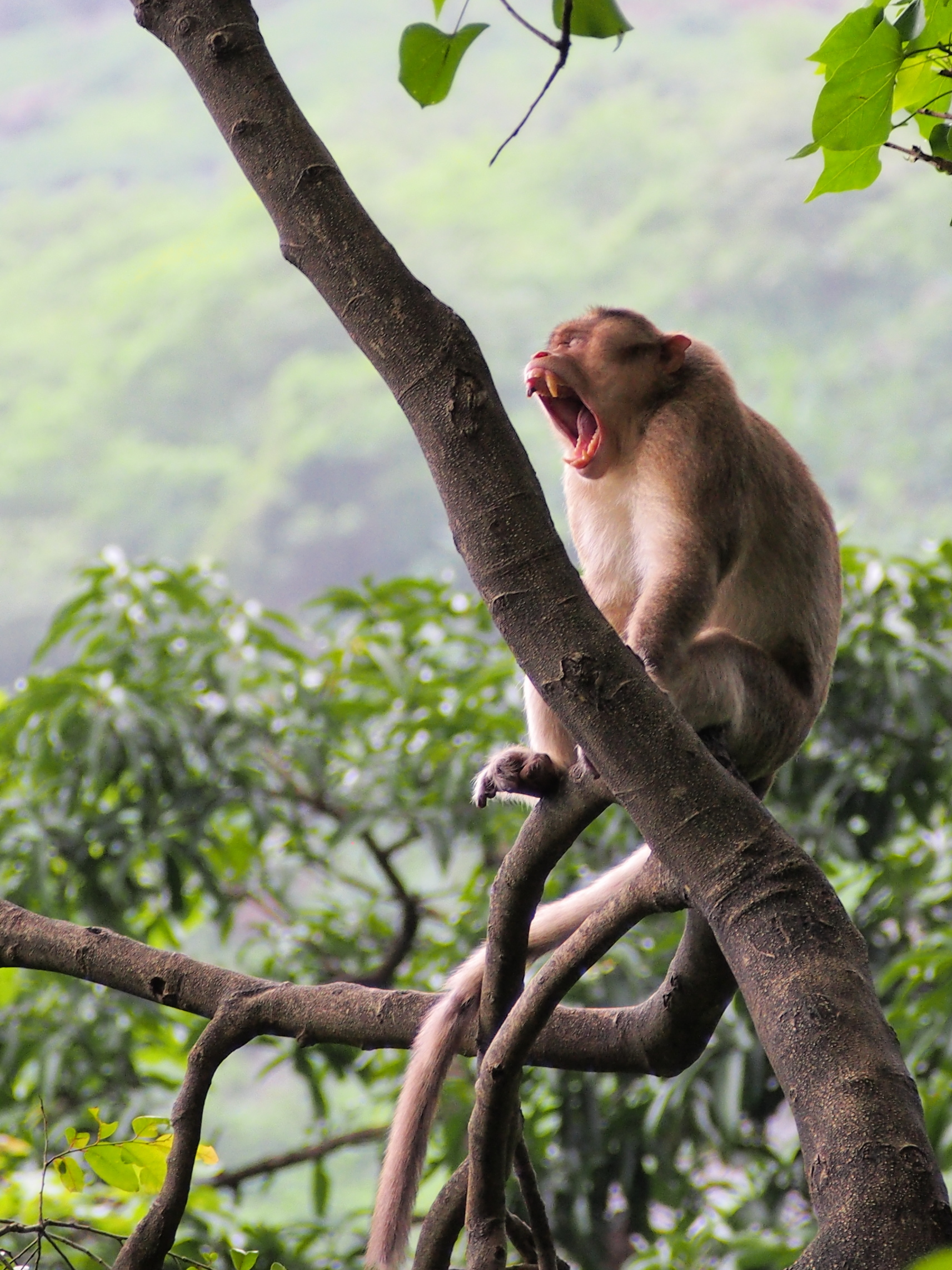
Showing canine teeth, in Maharashtra, India

The rhesus macaque is diurnal, and both arboreal and terrestrial. It is quadrupedal and, when on the ground, it walks digitigrade on its hind limbs and plantigrade on forelimbs. It is a good swimmer, and can swim across rivers.

Rhesus macaque at Mahakal temple, Darjeeling

In psychological research, rhesus macaques have demonstrated a variety of complex cognitive abilities, including the ability to make same–different judgments, understand simple rules, and monitor their own mental states. They have even been shown to demonstrate self-agency, an important type of self-awareness. In 2014, onlookers at a train station in Kanpur, India, observed a rhesus monkey that was knocked unconscious by overhead power lines; it was revived by another rhesus macaque that systematically administered a series of resuscitative actions.

=== Diet ===
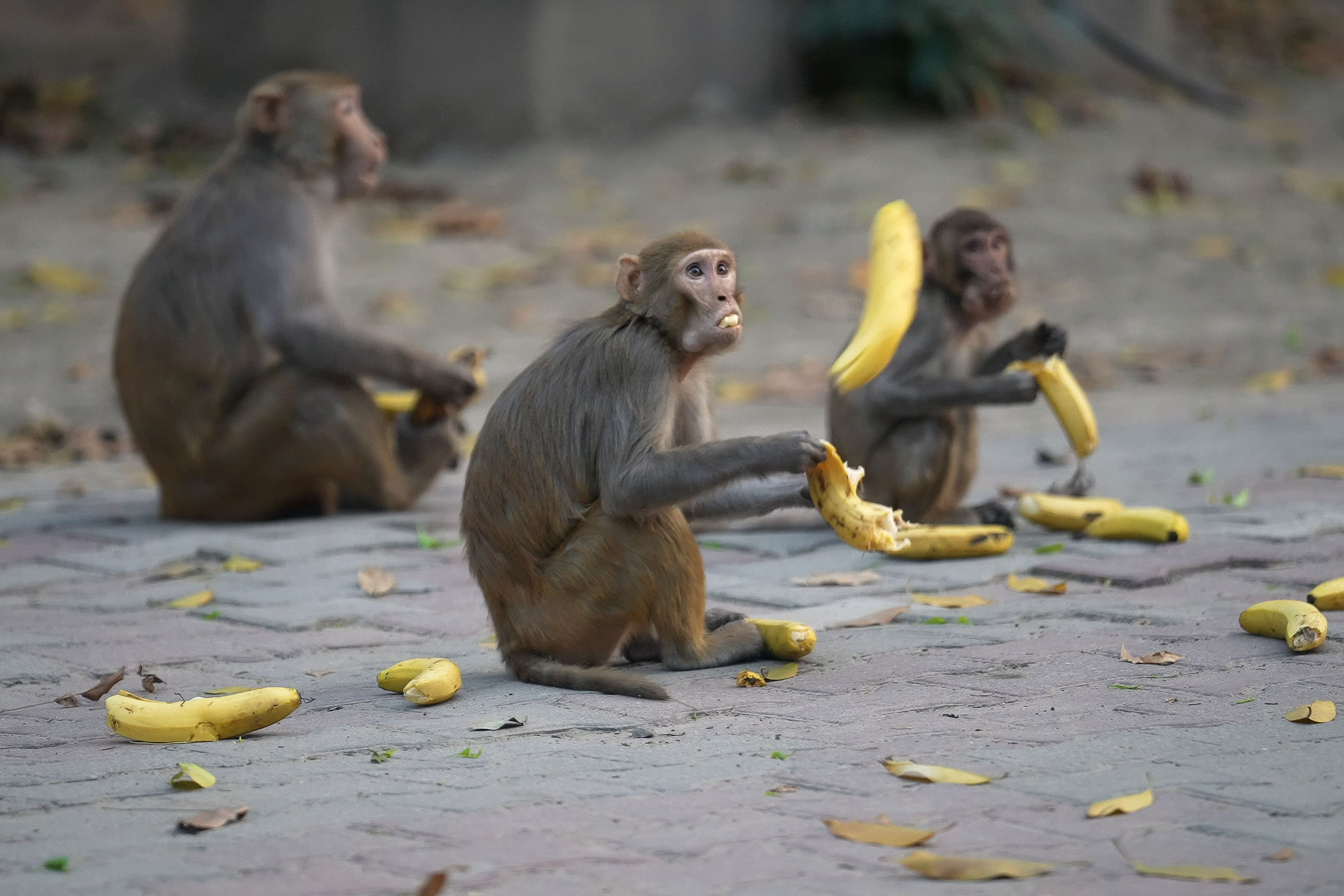
A group eating bananas in New Delhi

The rhesus macaque is mostly herbivorous, feeding mainly on fruit, but also eating seeds, roots, buds, bark, and cereals. It is estimated to consume around 99 different plant species in 46 families. During the monsoon season, it gets much of its water from ripe and succulent fruit. Rhesus macaques living far from water sources lick dewdrops from leaves and drink rainwater accumulated in tree hollows. They have also been observed eating termites, grasshoppers, ants, and beetles. When food is abundant, they are distributed in patches, and forage throughout the day in their home ranges. They drink water when foraging, and gather around streams and rivers. Rhesus macaques have specialized pouch-like cheeks, allowing them to temporarily hoard their food. With an increase in anthropogenic land changes, the rhesus macaque has evolved alongside intense and rapid environmental disturbance associated with human agriculture and urbanization resulting in proportions of their diet to be altered.

=== Group structure ===
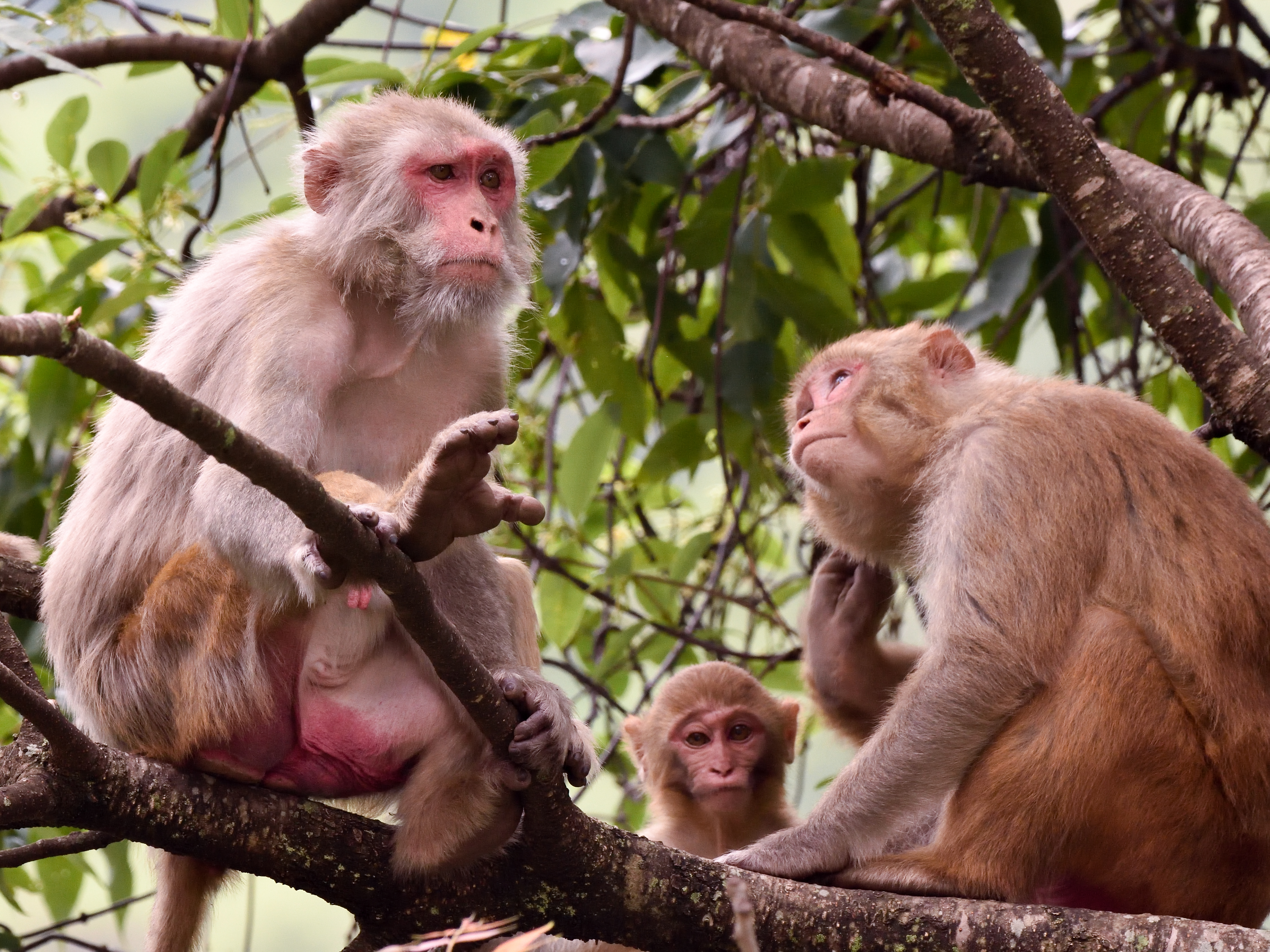
Adult females with baby in Himachal Pradesh, India

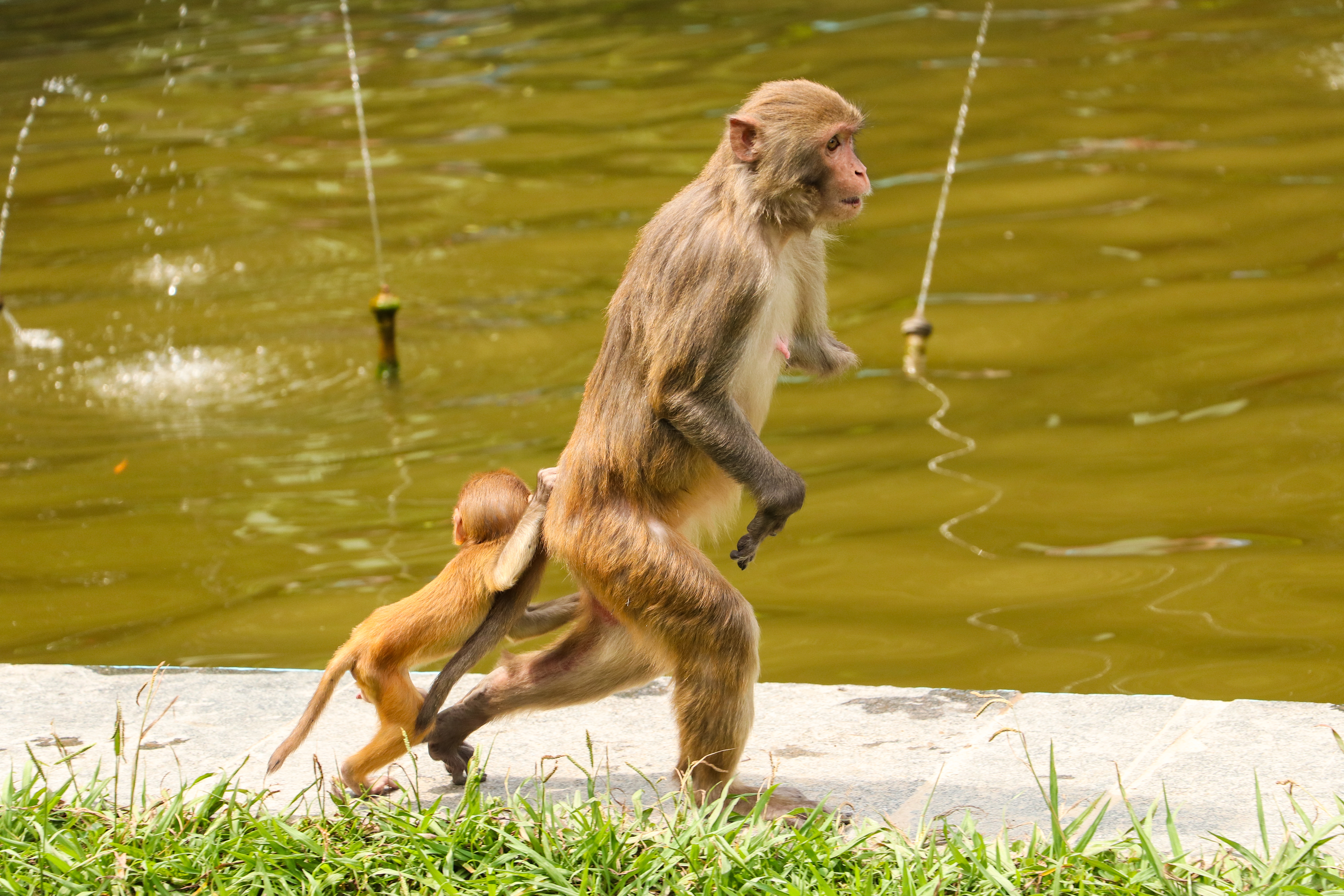
Mother with offspring in Nepal

The Rhesus macaque is adapted well to human presence and forms larger troops in human-dominated landscapes than in forests. It moves from rural to urban areas, coming to rely on handouts or refuse from humans. Rhesus macaque troops comprise a mixture of 20–200 males and females. Females may outnumber the males by a ratio of 4:1. Males and females have separate hierarchies. Female philopatry, common among social mammals, has been extensively studied in rhesus macaques. Females tend not to leave the social group, and have highly stable matrilineal hierarchies in which a female's rank is dependent on the rank of her mother. In addition, a single group may have multiple matrilineal lines existing in a hierarchy, and a female outranks any unrelated females that rank lower than her mother. Rhesus macaques are unusual in that the youngest females tend to outrank their older sisters. This is likely because young females are more fit and fertile. Mothers seem to prevent the older daughters from forming coalitions against her. The youngest daughter is the most dependent on the mother, and would have nothing to gain from helping her siblings in overthrowing their mother. Since each daughter has a high rank in her early years, rebelling against her mother is discouraged. Juvenile male macaques also exist in matrilineal lines, but once they reach four to five years of age, they are driven out of their natal groups by the dominant male. Thus, adult males gain dominance by age and experience.

In the group, macaques position themselves based on rank. The "central male subgroup" contains the two or three oldest and most dominant males which are codominant, along with females, their infants, and juveniles. This subgroup occupies the center of the group and determines the movements, foraging, and other routines. The females of this subgroup are also the most dominant of the entire group. The farther to the periphery a subgroup is, the less dominant it is. Subgroups on the periphery of the central group are run by one dominant male, of a rank lower than the central males, and he maintains order in the group and communicates messages between the central and peripheral males. A subgroup of subordinate, often subadult, males occupy the very edge of the groups, and have the responsibility of communicating with other macaque groups and making alarm calls. Rhesus social behaviour has been described as despotic, in that high-ranking individuals often show little tolerance, and frequently become aggressive towards non-kin. Top-ranking female rhesus monkeys are known to sexually coerce unreceptive males and also physically injure them, biting off digits and damaging their genitals.

Rhesus macaques have been observed engaging in interspecies grooming with Hanuman langurs and with sambar deer.

=== Communication ===
Rhesus macaques interact using a variety of facial expressions, vocalizations, body postures, and gestures. Perhaps the most common facial expression the macaque makes is the "silent bared teeth" face. This is made between individuals of different social ranks, with the lower-ranking one giving the expression to its superior. A less-dominant individual also makes a "fear grimace", accompanied by a scream, to appease or redirect aggression. Another submissive behavior is the "present rump", where an individual raises its tail and exposes its genitals to the dominant one. A dominant individual threatens another individual by standing quadrupedally and making a silent "open mouth stare" accompanied by the tail sticking straight. During movements, macaques make coos and grunts. These are also made during affiliative interactions, and approaches before grooming. When they find rare food of high quality, macaques emit warbles, harmonic arches, or chirps. When in threatening situations, macaques emit a single loud, high-pitched sound called a shrill bark. Screeches, screams, squeaks, pant-threats, growls, and barks are used during aggressive interactions. Infants "gecker" to attract their mother's attention.

=== Reproduction ===
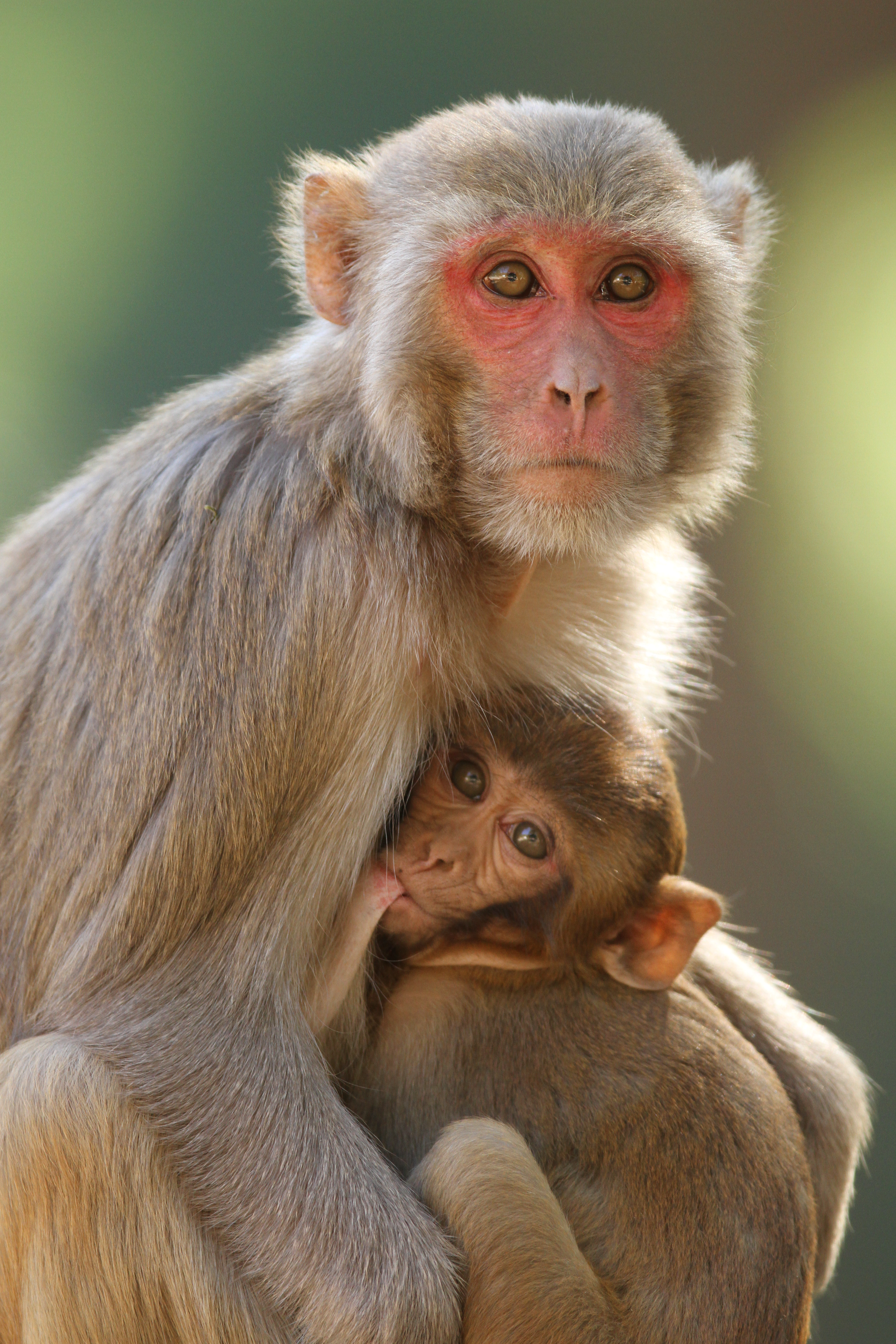
Mother with baby

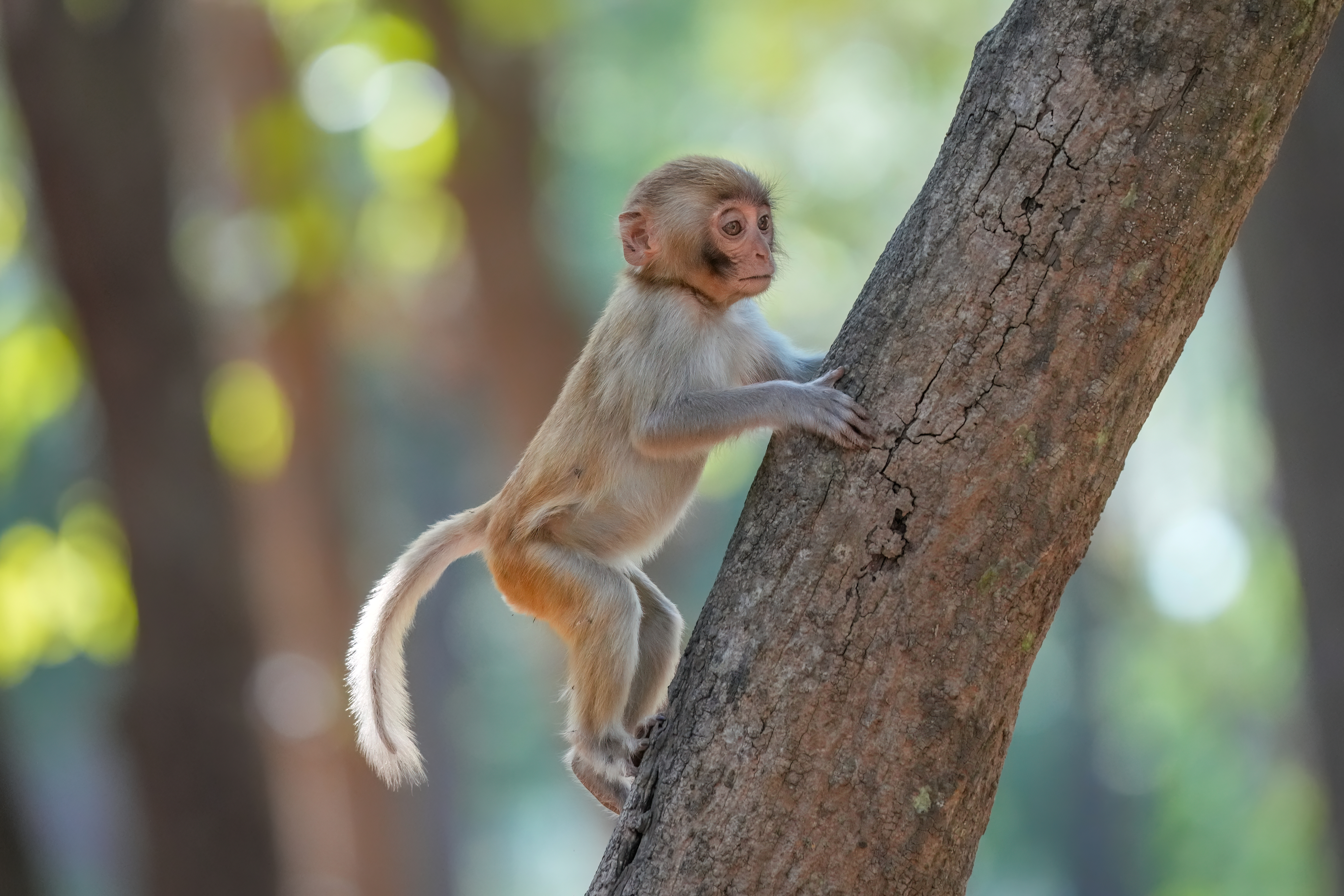
Baby in Jim Corbett National Park

Adult male macaques try to maximize their reproductive success by having sex with females both in and outside the breeding period. Females prefer to mate with males that are not familiar to them. Outsider males who are not members of the female's own troop are preferred over higher-ranking males. Outside of the consortship period, males and females return the prior behavior of not exhibiting preferential treatment or any special relationship. The breeding period can last up to eleven days, and a female usually mates with numerous males during that time. Male rhesus macaques have been observed to fight for access to sexually receptive females, and they suffer more wounds during the mating season. Female macaques first breed when they are four years old and reach menopause at around 25 years of age. Male macaques generally play no role in raising the young but do have peaceful relationships with the offspring of their consort pairs. Free-ranging rhesus macaques avoid inbreeding; adult females were never observed to copulate with males of their own matrilineage during their fertile periods.

Mothers with one or more immature daughters in addition to their infants are in contact with their infants less than those with no older immature daughters, because the mothers may pass the parenting responsibilities to their daughters. High-ranking mothers with older immature daughters also reject their infants significantly more than those without older daughters and tend to begin mating earlier in the mating season than expected based on their dates of parturition the preceding birth season. Infants farther from the center of the groups are more vulnerable to infanticide from outside groups. Some mothers abuse their infants, which is believed to be the result of controlling parenting styles.

Adult captive rhesus macaques take care of an unrelated infants. A male rhesus macaque ignores an infant as long as a female rhesus macaque is around. If a male rhesus macaque is the only option for parental care, it tends to an unrelated infant as a female would.

=== Aging ===
The rhesus monkey has been used as a model for studying aging of the ovaries of primate females. Ovarian aging was found to be associated with increased DNA double strand breaks and reduced DNA repair in granulosa cells, that is, somatic cells closely associated with developing oocytes.

=== Self-awareness ===
In several experiments giving mirrors to rhesus monkeys, they looked into the mirrors and groomed themselves, as well as flexed various muscle groups. This behaviour indicates that they recognised and were aware of themselves.

=== Predators ===
Common thresher sharks and Ganges sharks prey on rhesus macaques when they swim across estuaries at ebb tide.

=== Human–rhesus conflict ===
The macaque–human relationships is complex and culturally specific, ranging from relatively peaceful coexistence to extreme levels of conflict. Conflicts tend to result from rapidly changing agricultural practices, increasing urbanisation, and clearing of woodlands and other territory, pushing macaques into human settlements in the search for resources. A 2021 study stated that human-macaque conflict is one of the most critical challenges faced by wildlife managers in the South- and Southeast-Asian regions.

Conflict between rhesus macaques and humans is at all-time high, with areas once forested habitat being converted to industrial agriculture. In Nepal, the expansion of monocultures, increased forest fragmentation, degradation of natural habitats and changing agricultural practices have led to a significant increase in the frequency of human-macaque conflict. Crop raiding is one of the biggest visible effects of human-rhesus conflict. The estimated financial cost to individual farmer households of macaque corn and rice raiding is approximately US$14.9 or 4.2% of their yearly income. This has resulted in farmers and other members of the population viewing macaques inhabiting agricultural landscapes as serious crop pests.

Rhesus macaques are rated as one of the top ten crop-raiding wildlife species in Nepal. Mitigation strategies offer the most effective solutions for reducing conflict between rhesus macaques and people in Nepal; these include "prioritizing forest restoration programs, strategic management plans designed to connect isolated forest fragments with high rhesus macaque population densities, creating government programs that compensate farmers for income lost due to crop-raiding, and educational outreach that informs local villagers of the importance of conservation and protecting biodiversity.

In India, human-macaque conflict occurs particularly in Uttarakhand and Himachal Pradesh, where it is a source of contentious debate in political scenarios, resentment and polarization amongst agriculturalists and wildlife conservationists. Crop raiding by rhesus macaques has been identified as the main cause of conflict. In urban areas, rhesus macaques damage property and injure people in house raids to access food and provisions; in agricultural areas, they cause financial losses to farmers due to crop depredation. The estimated extent of crop damages in Himachal Pradesh ranges from 10–100% to 40–80% of all crop losses. The financial implications of such damage is estimated at approximately US$200,000 in agriculture and US$150,000 in horticulture. Quantification of crop and financial loses is challenging. Farmers' negative views of macaques may cause them to perceive higher than actual losses. This has led to harsh actions against rhesus macaque communities. Other factors in rhesus perception include economic status, farmer economic stability, cultural attitudes towards the given species and the frequency and intensity of wildlife conflicts. All of the above have resulted in changes in conservation and management with legal rhesus macaque culling issued in 2010.

Human-macaque conflict is also occurring in China, specifically in the area of Longyang District, Baoshan City, Yunnan Province. The peak period of conflict occurs from August–October. Factors associated with accessibility and availability of food and shelter appear to be the key drivers of human-macaque conflict, with an overall increase between the years of 2012 and 2021.

One key factor of conflict that directly affects the human-macaque relationship is visibility. Visibility of rhesus macaques in agroecosystem-dominated areas largely impacts conflict between humans and rhesus macaques. The conspicuous presence of rhesus macaques in and around farms results in farmers believing that macaques cause heavy crop depredations which, in turn, have led to negative perceptions and actions against the species.

In March 2018, it was reported that a monkey had entered a house in a village in Odisha and kidnapped a baby. The baby was later found dead in a well. Though monkeys are known to attack people, enter homes and damage property, this reported behaviour was unusual.

=== Population management tools ===
Sitting on a sign prohibiting the feeding of macaques, in Yunnan, China

Crop-raiding is seen as one of the most important behaviours to change to reduce conflicts. One example is the implementation of guards in agricultural settings to chase off intruding monkeys using dogs, slingshots, and firecrackers. This method is non-lethal and can alter behavioural patterns of crop-raiding monkeys. Another strategy that farmers can employ is to plant alternative, buffer crops which are unattractive to monkeys in high-conflict zones, such as along the edges of macaque habitats. In urban settings, planting food trees within city periphery and country parks aim to discourage macaques from entering nearby residential areas for food. In areas of tourism, human behaviour change is necessary to prevent conflict. An important aspect is enforcing no feed regulations that only allow provisioning by trained staff at scheduled times. Regulating visitor behaviours that provoke aggressive responses from macaques, including noise regulation, greatly benefits conflict reduction. translocation of problem macaques in urban rhesus communities in India has been employed as a non-lethal solution to human–macaque conflicts. Fertility control is also feasible for reducing human–macaque conflict because it avoids killing costs and problems associated with translocation.

== In science ==
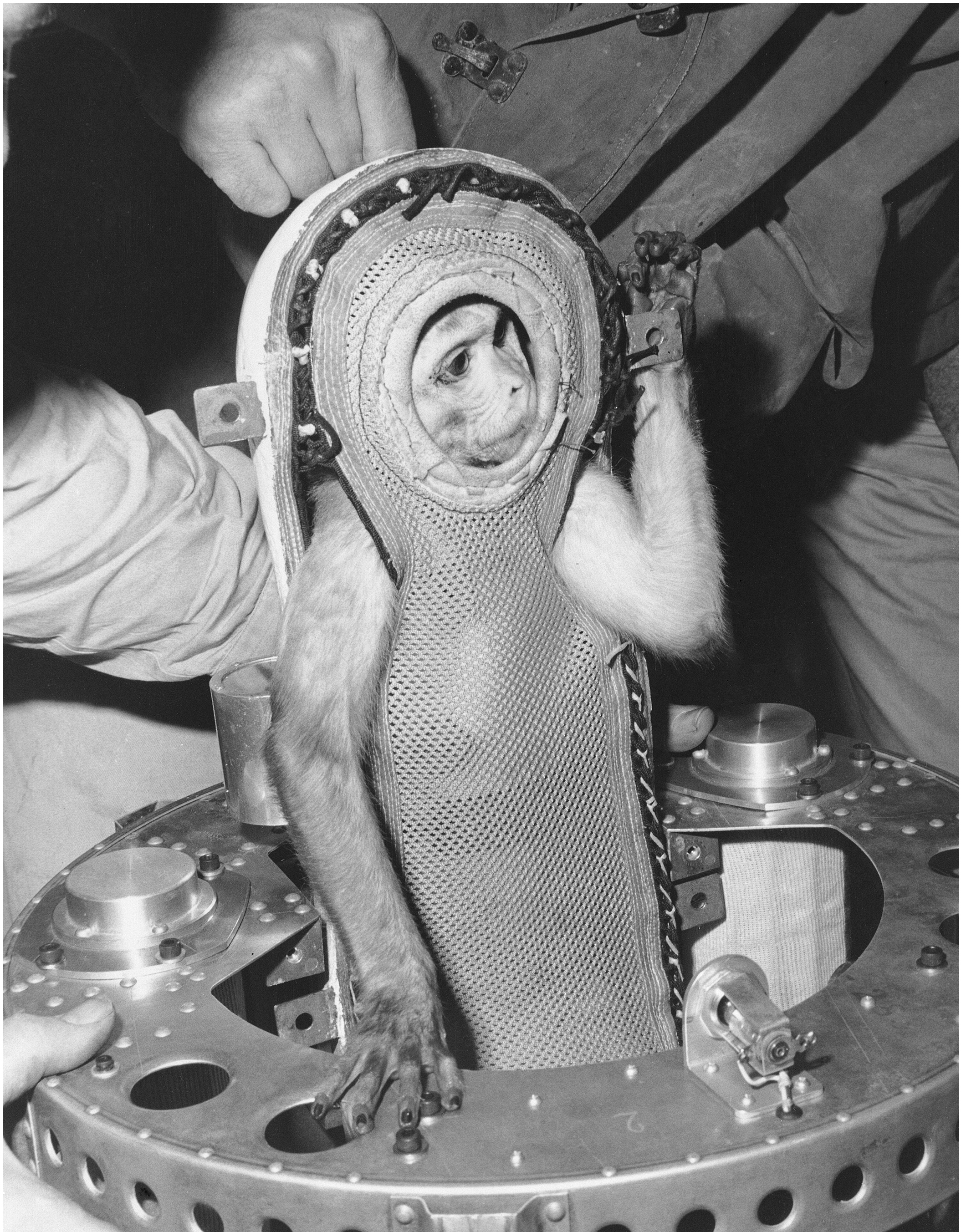
Project Mercury rocket Little Joe 1B, launched in 1960, carried Miss Sam to 9.3 mi (15.0 km) in altitude.

The rhesus macaque is well known to science. Due to its relatively easy upkeep in captivity, wide availability, and closeness to humans anatomically and physiologically, it has been used extensively in medical and biological research on human and animal health-related topics. It has given its name to the Rh factor, one of the elements of a person's blood group, by the discoverers of the factor, Karl Landsteiner and Alexander Wiener. The rhesus macaque was also used in the well-known experiments on maternal deprivation carried out in the 1950s by controversial comparative psychologist Harry Harlow. Other medical breakthroughs facilitated by the use of the rhesus macaque include:

- development of the rabies, smallpox, and polio vaccines
- creation of drugs to manage HIV/AIDS
- understanding of the female reproductive cycle and development of the embryo and the propagation of embryonic stem cells.

The U.S. Army, the U.S. Air Force, and NASA launched rhesus macaques into outer space during the 1950s and 1960s, and the Soviet/Russian space program launched them into space as recently as 1997 on the Bion missions. Albert II became the first primate and first mammal in space during a U.S. V-2 rocket suborbital flight on 14 June 1949, and died on impact when a parachute failed.

Another rhesus monkey, Able, was launched on a suborbital spaceflight in 1959, and was among the first living beings (along with Miss Baker, a squirrel monkey on the same mission) to travel in space and return alive.

On 25 October 1999, the rhesus macaque became the first cloned primate with the birth of Tetra. January 2001 had the birth of ANDi, the first transgenic primate; ANDi carries foreign genes originally from a jellyfish.

Though most studies of the rhesus macaque are from various locations in northern India, some knowledge of the natural behavior of the species comes from studies carried out on a colony established by the Caribbean Primate Research Center of the University of Puerto Rico on the island of Cayo Santiago, off Puerto Rico, where approximately 1800 of the monkeys live. No predators are on the island, and humans are not permitted to land except as part of the research programmes. The colony is provisioned to some extent, but about half of its food comes from natural foraging.

Rhesus macaques, like many macaques, carry the herpes B virus. This virus does not typically harm the monkey, but is very dangerous to humans in the rare event that it jumps species, for example in the 1997 death of Yerkes National Primate Research Center researcher Elizabeth Griffin.

At a Japanese zoo, 2016

=== Genome sequencing ===
Genomic information
- NCBI ID: 9544
- Ploidy: diploid
- Genome size: 3,097.37 Mb
- Number of chromosomes: 21 pairs
- Year of completion: 2007

Work on the genome of the rhesus macaque was completed in 2007, making the species the second nonhuman primate whose genome was sequenced. Humans and macaques apparently share about 93% of their DNA sequence and shared a common ancestor roughly 25 million years ago. The rhesus macaque has 21 pairs of chromosomes.

Comparison of rhesus macaques, chimpanzees, and humans revealed the structure of ancestral primate genomes, positive selection pressure and lineage-specific expansions, and contractions of gene families. "The goal is to reconstruct the history of every gene in the human genome," said Evan Eichler, University of Washington, Seattle. DNA from different branches of the primate tree will allow us "to trace back the evolutionary changes that occurred at various time points, leading from the common ancestors of the primate clade to Homo sapiens," said Bruce Lahn, University of Chicago.

After the human and chimpanzee genomes were sequenced and compared, it was usually impossible to tell whether differences were the result of the human or chimpanzee gene changing from the common ancestor. After the rhesus macaque genome was sequenced, three genes could be compared. If two genes were the same, they were presumed to be the original gene.

DNA microarrays are used in macaque research. For example, Michael Katze of University of Washington, Seattle, infected macaques with 1918 and modern influenzas. The DNA microarray showed the macaque genomic response to human influenza on a cellular level in each tissue. Both viruses stimulated innate immune system inflammation, but the 1918 flu stimulated stronger and more persistent inflammation, causing extensive tissue damage, and it did not stimulate the interferon-1 pathway. The DNA response showed a transition from innate to adaptive immune response over seven days.

The full sequence and annotation of the macaque genome is available on the Ensembl genome browser.

== Conservation status ==
The rhesus macaque is listed as Least Concern on the IUCN Red List and estimated to exist in large numbers; it is tolerant of a broad range of habitats, including urban environments. It has the largest natural range of any non-human primate. The Thai population is locally threatened. In addition to habitat destruction and agricultural encroachment, pet releases of the different species into existing troops are diluting the gene pool and putting its genetic integrity at risk. Despite the wealth of information on its ecology and behaviour, little attention has been paid to its demography or population status, which can pose a risk for future Rhesus macaque populations. The extension of its distributional limits by approximately 3,500 km^{2} (1,400 sq mi) in southeast India caused population stress on other species. This range extension has been caused by human intervention tactics whereby village translocation occurs from urban conflict ridden areas.

== See also ==
- Girneys
