= Tom Mustill =

British author and nature film maker

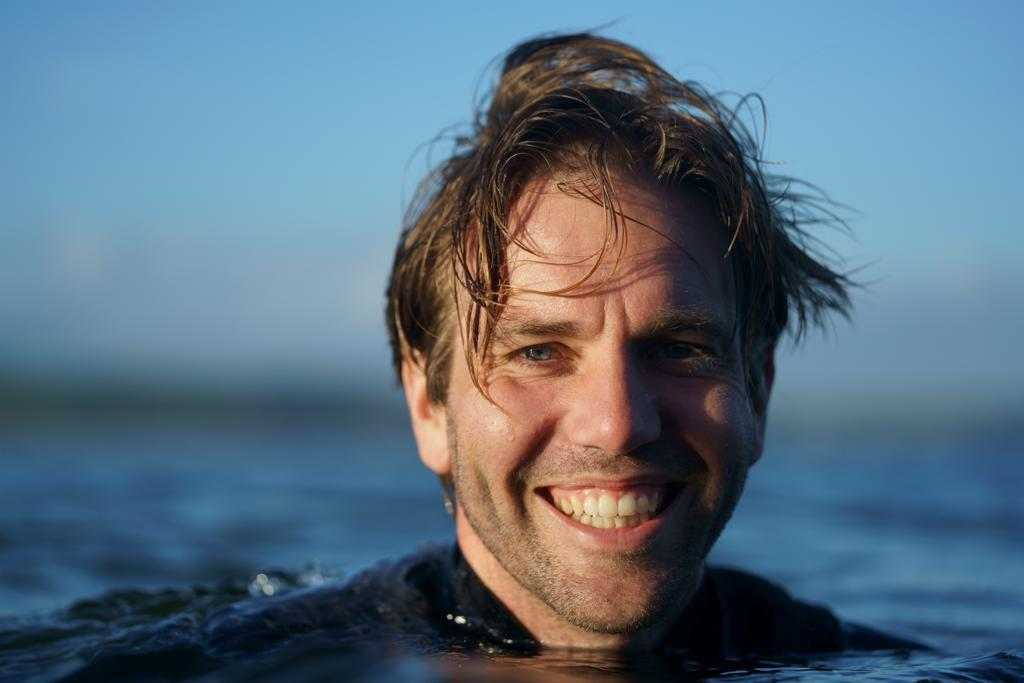
- Education: St John's College, Cambridge
- Occupations: Author and documentary film maker
- Years active: 2008–present
- Parent(s): Michael Mustill, Caroline Mustill
- Website: https://www.tommustill.com/

Tom Mustill is a British producer and director of nature documentaries, and the author of a popular science book How to Speak Whale: A Voyage into the Future of Animal Communication.

He has collaborated with science and nature personalities including David Attenborough, Greta Thunberg, Stephen Fry and George Monbiot. He co-hosts a podcast, So Hot Right Now, with journalist Lucy Siegle in which guests (including Greta Thunberg, Farhana Yamin and George Monbiot) discuss topics related to climate change and conservation.

In September 2015 he was the unwitting subject of a viral video showing him narrowly escaping death when a humpback whale breached beside him, landing on the kayak in which he was paddling.

== Early life and education ==
Mustill studied Natural Sciences at St John's College, Cambridge, during which time he spent his summers assisting a Russian paleontologist studying rare precambrian fossils in the Ural mountains.

After graduating, he worked as a field conservation biologist before moving in to TV production on the basis that this would allow him to have a greater impact on public understanding around and support of conservation and efforts to tackle climate change.

== Documentary films ==
Starting out as a researcher in the BBC's wildlife unit, Mustill went on to work on the nature documentary TV series Inside Nature's Giants and since then has specialised in films that combine stories of animals with those of the people who work and live among them.

His film Kangaroo Dundee followed animal sanctuary founder Chris Barns and his mission to rescue and care for orphaned baby kangaroos, and led to Barns becoming an overnight celebrity and unexpected sex symbol, with author Caitlin Moran dubbing him 'David Attenborphwoargh'.

The Bat Man of Mexico featured ecologist Rodrigo Medellín's efforts to track and protect the migratory routes of lesser long-nosed bats across Mexico (and in doing so secure the survival of Tequila, which is made from the Agave plant for which bats are a primary pollinator).

Humpback Whales: A Detective Story meanwhile follows a community of whalewatchers, biologists, conservationists and animal rescuers united by their interest in whales, and uses this to explore the growing threats from pollution, maritime traffic and climate change to cetaceans.

=== Gripping Films ===
Mustill is the founder of Gripping Films, a production company specialising in films aimed at driving social change.

His short film #NatureNow was created from recycled footage, released under a Creative Commons license and translated through crowdsourcing into 30 languages. It was screened to delegates at the 2019 UNFCCC Climate COP27 and retweeted by Prime Minister Justin Trudeau, actors Jeff Bridges and Mark Ruffalo and the band Pearl Jam.

Another film, Imagine For 1 Minute (conceived under lockdown during the COVID-19 pandemic and screened at a 'virtual summit' of the United Nations), was created from the crowdsourced selfies and voice notes, including from spiritual leaders including Pope Francis and Mata Amritanandamayi, diplomats including António Guterres and Christiana Figueres, and sports personalities including Paulo Dybala, Nico Rosberg and Dan Carter.

=== Low-carbon filmmaking ===
Mustill is an Ambassador for the British Academy of Film and Television Arts Film and Television Sustainability scheme. His film Humpback Whales: A Detective Story was the first BBC Natural World production to receive a BAFTA (British Academy of Film and Television Arts) Albert certification, while his short film #NatureNow was carbon neutral.

== Whale breach ==
In September 2015, Mustill was kayaking with a friend in Monterey Bay, California when an adult humpback whale breached beside them and landed on their kayak, forcing them under water and narrowly avoiding crushing them. A video clip of the event taken by a nearby tourist went viral. Although Mustill and his friend escaped uninjured, Mustill claimed that the experience left a deep mark on him.

In his film Humpback Whales: A Detective Story he speaks to others who have had similar encounters as well as whale conservationists and biologists to try to track down the whale and to understand the factors that might have led to it breaching on him. In the course of this scientists were able to identify the individual whale that had landed on him ('Prime Suspect'/'CRC-12564') using machine learning, a branch of artificial intelligence (AI).

== How to Speak Whale ==
Following filming of Humpback Whales: A Detective Story, Mustill wrote How to Speak Whale: A Voyage into the Future of Animal Communication (2022), a popular science book which explores recent developments in natural science and AI that could bring humans closer to communicating with animals, and particularly cetaceans.

== Filmography ==
Year	Series	Episode	Role	Narrated by/Featuring
2009	Inside Nature's Giants	S1E1-4, S2E3: "The Elephant", "The Whale", "The Crocodile", "The Giraffe", "The Big Cats"	Assistant Producer	Mark Evans, Richard Dawkins, Joy Reidenberg
2010	Nanoyou		Writer/Director/Producer	Stephen Fry
2010	Inside Nature's Giants	S2 Special: "The Giant Squid"	Edit Producer	Mark Evans, Richard Dawkins, Joy Reidenberg
2011	Inside Nature's Giants	S3 Special: "The Sperm Whale"	Director	Mark Evans, Richard Dawkins, Joy Reidenberg
2011	Inside Nature's Giants	S3E3: "The Camel"	Director	Mark Evans, Richard Dawkins, Joy Reidenberg
2012	Inside Nature's Giants	S4E4: "The Jungle"	Producer/Director	Mark Evans, Richard Dawkins, Joy Reidenberg
2013	How to Win the Grand National	"How to Win the Grand National"	Director	Mark Evans
2013	Natural World	S31E7: "Kangaroo Dundee - Part 1"	Producer/Director	Juliet Stevenson, Chris 'Brolga' Barnes
2013	Natural World	S31E8: "Kangaroo Dundee - Part 2"	Producer/Director	Juliet Stevenson, Chris 'Brolga' Barnes
2014	Natural World	S33E6: "The Bat Man of Mexico"	Director	David Attenborough
2016	Natural World	S35E6: "Giraffes: Africa's Gentle Giants"	Producer/Director	David Attenborough
2018	Extraordinary Rituals	S1E3: "Changing World"	Producer/Director	Simon Reeve (British TV presenter)
2018	Extraordinary Rituals	S1E2: "Great Gatherings"	Producer/Director	Simon Reeve (British TV presenter)
2019	Natural World	S37E7: "Humpback Whales: A Detective Story"	Producer/Director	
2019	#NatureNow		Director	Greta Thunberg, George Monbiot
2020	Imagine For 1 Minute		Director	Greta Thunberg, Dan Carter, Christiana Figueres, Pope Francis
2021	For Nature		Director	Greta Thunberg
2021	Thank you sea		Director	
