= Is Born series =

Tv show-reality

The Is Born collection of television series produced for the Discovery Channel and made by i2i Television in the UK, presented by Mark Evans.

Each series follows Evans as he either builds or restores a vehicle.

== Series ==
=== Cars ===
- A Car is Born - Pilgrim Sumo 5.7 litre V8 super car (AC Cobra kitcar)
- A Car is Reborn - 1965 series 1.1 E-Type Jaguar
- A Racing Car is Born - Westfield 1800
- A 4x4 is Born - 1985 four-door Land Rover
- An MG is Born - 1973 MGB Roadster

=== Bikes ===
- A Bike is Born - Custom Trike
- A Bike is Born - 1970 Triumph Bonneville T120R
- A Bike is Born - 1942 Harley Davidson

=== Aircraft ===
- A Plane Is Born - Europa XS
- A Chopper is Born - Rotorway Exec 162F

== See also ==
- Wreck Rescue (Mark Evans 2007 Discovery Channel show where he "inspires and motivates" five amateur vehicle restorers to bring their projects to completion.)
