= Boxing kangaroo =

National symbol of Australia

Boxing kangaroo flag, design used in 1983

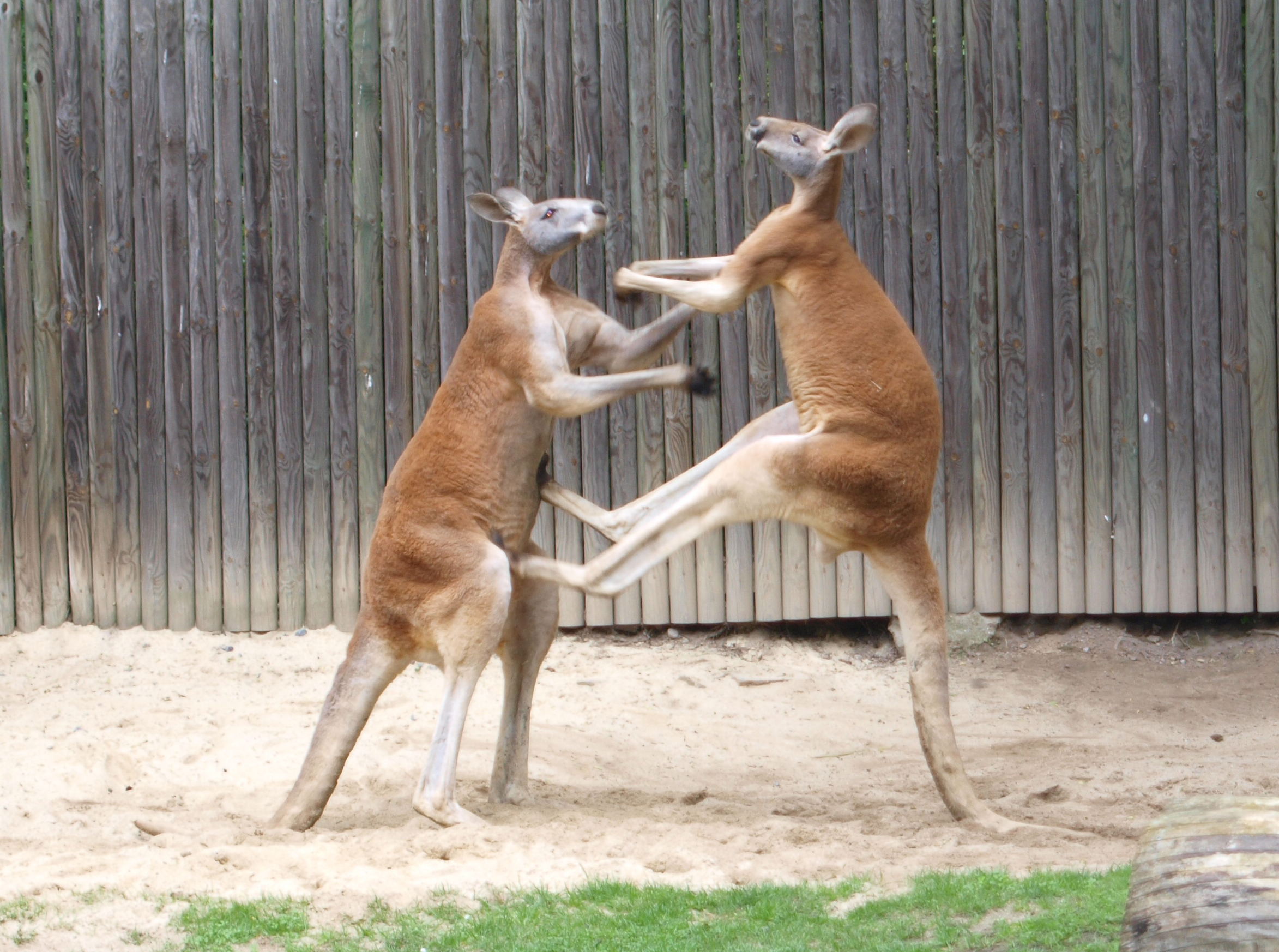
The inspiration for the flag: the ritualised fighting of kangaroos

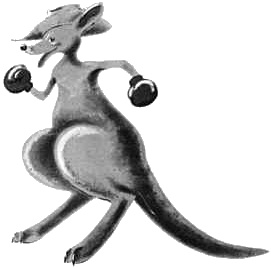
A boxing kangaroo wearing a slouch hat painted on the nose of an RAF B-24 Liberator bomber flown by an RAAF crew based in Agra, India, c. 1943–44

The boxing kangaroo is a national symbol of Australia, frequently seen in pop culture. The symbol is often displayed prominently by Australian spectators at sporting events, such as at cricket, tennis, basketball and soccer matches, and at the Commonwealth and Olympic Games. The flag is also highly associated with its namesake national rugby league team – the Kangaroos. A distinctive flag featuring the symbol has since been considered Australia's sporting flag.

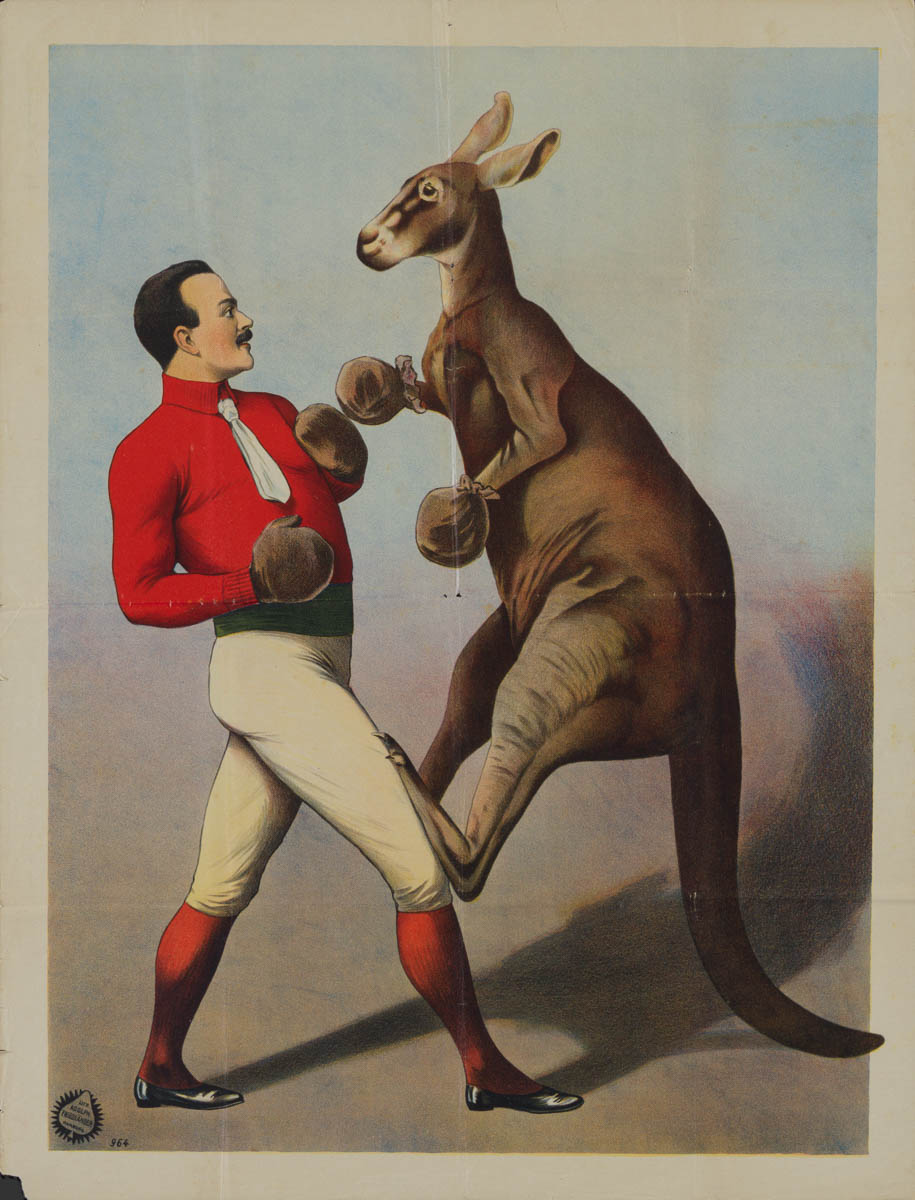
Kangaroo boxing sideshow poster from 1890s printed by Adolph Friedländer

== History ==
The idea of a boxing kangaroo originates from the animal's defensive behaviour, in which it will use its smaller forelegs (its arms) to hold an attacker in place while using the claws on its larger hind legs to try to kick, slash or disembowel them. This stance gives the impression that the kangaroo appears to be boxing with its attacker.

The image of the boxing kangaroo has been known since at least 1891, when a cartoon titled "Jack, the fighting Kangaroo with Professor Lendermann" appeared in the magazine Melbourne Punch. In the late 19th century, outback travelling shows featured kangaroos wearing boxing gloves fighting against men. Das Boxende Känguruh, an 1895 German silent film directed by Max Skladanowsky, and an English silent film, The Boxing Kangaroo, produced by Birt Acres in 1896 also both featured kangaroos boxing against men, while such American animated shorts as The Boxing Kangaroo (1920), Mickey's Kangaroo (1935) and Pop 'Im Pop! (1949) helped establish the concept of a boxing kangaroo as a popular culture cliché.. The 1933 film Hell Below features a boxing match between a kangaroo and Jimmy Durante. The 1970 novel Matilda by Paul Gallico, and the subsequent 1978 Hollywood movie Matilda, which starred Elliott Gould and Robert Mitchum, featured a boxing kangaroo that was exploited for prize fighting.

During World War II boxing kangaroos were stencilled on Australian fighter aircraft of No. 21 Squadron RAAF based in Singapore and Malaya to differentiate their aircraft from British planes. The practice soon spread to other units, as well as onto ships in the Royal Australian Navy.

In 1983 the boxing kangaroo received national and international prominence when it served as the symbol for the successful Australian challenge for the America's Cup, where the boxing kangaroo flag, a red-gloved golden kangaroo on a green background, was flown from the yacht Australia II. Alan Bond (owner of the Australia II yacht) owned the image and licensed it for mass production. The image was later bought by the Australian Olympic Committee, and is used as a mascot to represent the Australian Olympic team and to promote sport and fair play in schools.

The Boxing Kangaroo design created in 1983 as part of the successful Australian challenge to the America's Cup – and later bought by the Australian Olympic Committee – was originally designed by Steve Castledine, now a widely respected fine artist specialising in watercolours.

== 2010 Winter Olympics controversy ==
Leading up to the 2010 Winter Olympics, the International Olympic Committee ordered the removal of a two-story high Australian boxing kangaroo flag that had been draped over a balcony in the athletes' village by Australian athletes. The IOC ordered the flag to be taken down as they believed the symbol to be "too commercial" as it is a registered trademark (albeit of the Australian Olympic Committee, a non-profit organization).

The IOC subsequently drew widespread criticism for its request, including from Deputy Prime Minister of Australia Julia Gillard, who came out in support of the athletes, declaring that the IOC made a ridiculous decision by ordering the flag's removal. The Australian team later decided they would only take down the flag upon receiving a formal written request for its removal.

On 8 February 2010, after a meeting between IOC president Jacques Rogge and Australian Olympic Committee president John Coates, it was agreed the green and gold flag featuring a kangaroo wearing boxing gloves could stay. "The IOC has a clean venue policy in order to protect the commercial rights of its sponsors", Coates said, "but clearly on this occasion Australia was not trying to ambush either the IOC or VANOC".

== See also ==
- Roger (kangaroo)
- List of Australian sporting mascots
- National personification
