= Roger (kangaroo) =

Australian red kangaroo (c. 2006–2018)

- Species: Red kangaroo
- Sex: Male
- Born: c. 2006; Northern Territory, Australia
- Died: 8 December 2018 (aged 11–12) (death announced on this date); The Kangaroo Sanctuary; Alice Springs, Australia
- Known for: Muscular physique

Roger (c. 2006–2018) was an Australian red kangaroo best known for his muscular physique.

== Life ==
Roger was rescued as a joey by Chris 'Brolga' Barns after Roger's mother was killed by a car. Barns started the Kangaroo Sanctuary on 188 acres (76 ha) in Alice Springs to house and protect Roger and other roos, including Roger's mates. Barns stated following the announcement of Roger's death that "Roger was the sanctuary's alpha male for many years". Roger grew to be 6 feet 7 inches (2 m) and around 200 pounds (91 kg). In videos Roger can be seen chasing Barns, who, like all other males, Roger saw as a threat to his harem.

Roger first came to fame in 2015 in a video that went viral, showing a bucket he was said to have crushed. In 2016, Barns announced that Roger was suffering from arthritis.

== Death and reaction ==
Barns announced Roger's death on 8 December 2018. Roger, also known as "Ripped Roger", the "Jacked Kangaroo", and "One of the strongest kangaroos ever" was 12. Upon hearing of Roger's death, Australian singer Natalie Imbruglia said "He always brought a smile to my face. Such a proud strong boy", and Tourism Australia called him a "true icon". The cause of death was reported as "old age".

== See also ==
- Boxing kangaroo
