= Pet Rescue (TV series) =

- Presented by: Wendy Turner Webster

Production
- Producer: Endemol
- Running time: 30 mins

Original release
- Network: Channel 4
- Release: January 1997 – September 2003

Pet Rescue is a British daytime TV series broadcast on Channel 4. Launched in January 1997, it chronicled various pets and animals being rescued, cared for, and then either rehoused or returned to the wild.

Produced by Bazal Productions/Endemol for Channel 4, and with a theme tune penned by Simon May, it ran to a set format, which developed little over time:

- A central presenter
- A location, based around an RSPCA office
- A couple of 'show' stories which were intertwined, and reached conclusion within that show - i.e.: animal rehoused/released into wild
- A longer story about a particular animal, species or animal issue

The program closed with an "advert" for a particular animal which had spent a lot of time in a rescue home, which the public could call in to apply to rehouse. This later feature followed normal RSPCA rehousing procedures, and was not a "lottery".

Presenters included:

- Mark Evans
- Tris Payne
- Matthew Robertson
- Wendy Turner Webster
- Helen Page

Channel 4 axed the series in November 2002, shortly after it had reached its 1,000th episode. Repeats can now be seen on Animal Planet, National Geographic Wild, and DMAX. In 2005, Wendy Turner Webster re-recorded her voice over of the show, to keep viewers up to date with animals progress due to repeat airings.

== See also ==
- RSPCA Animal Rescue
