= Fred (baboon) =

Chacma baboon

Fred eating inside a car

Fred (died 25 March 2011) was a chacma baboon from Cape Town, South Africa. He came to international attention as the leader of a baboon "gang" which developed a reputation for raiding homes and cars, as well as attacking local residents and tourists. This led to Fred being labelled as aggressive by authorities. Fred was captured in early 2011, and killed soon afterwards.

News photographers and local police pursued Fred for about three years. During one attack in 2010, the baboon was reported to have caused injuries to three people while searching for food in Cape Town. Two of the wounded required medical attention after the attack. When baboon monitors were mobilised to disrupt Fred's activities, the baboon initiated a violent campaign against them as well. Human negligence and "misguided efforts" were blamed for Fred's eventual "demise" – "Because people want to love, laugh at and be entertained by baboons, they start a cycle of events that can lead to tragedy, as in the case of this baboon", the city said, adding "He targets cars with bags and visible food, but it is his ability to open closed car doors that surprised everyone".

The decision to have him euthanised was not taken lightly and not without extensive discussions between all the parties involved. This baboon's aggression had recently escalated to the point where the safety of tourists, motorists, and other travellers along the road past Smitswinkel Bay was being threatened. – statement released by Cape Town's Baboon Operational Group.

Although the majority of local residents supported the decision to kill Fred, a few of them made attempts to spare his life. Documentary filmmaker Joss Lean filmed Fred's capture before following the vehicle in which he was imprisoned amid efforts to have him released. The baboon conservation organization, Baboon Matters in nearby Kommetjie, also made several attempts to intercede on Fred's behalf.

The British television series Baboons with Bill Bailey regularly featured Fred and his troop. Following Fred's euthanization, the graphic dissection of Fred's body was shown on an episode of Inside Nature's Giants. X-rays revealed numerous shotgun pellets throughout Fred's body, and many more were found during the dissection.

== See also ==
- List of individual monkeys
