= Mark Evans (TV presenter) =

Television presenter, veterinary surgeon

- Education: Warwick School; Royal Veterinary College
- Occupations: Veterinary Surgeon; Television Presenter; Producer; Author; Amateur Engineer
- Known for: Pet Rescue; A 4x4 Is Born; Barking Mad; Inside Nature's Giants; Dead Famous DNA; Dogs: Their Secret Lives
- Website: Website

Mark Evans is a British veterinary surgeon turned television presenter.

== Early and personal life ==
Educated at Warwick School, Evans failed to get the needed grades at A Levels the first time – he says due to completing restoration work on a Triumph Herald 13/60 convertible. He graduated from the Royal Veterinary College at the University of London, where he won the Professor Formston silver medal for surgery.

== Veterinarian ==
Evans developed his career in private veterinary practice, mainly with dogs, cats, and horses in the Surrey Hills. He has written 12 books on animal care and welfare. He was the RSPCA's chief veterinary advisor between 2007 and 2010, causing some controversy in August 2008 after branding show dogs and dog shows as a "parade of mutants", resulting in the RSPCA withdrawing its support that year to the annual Crufts dog show.

== Television ==
Evans's television career started in 1990 when he complained about an item on TV-am that made fun of fat pets, and was invited as a guest on the show giving advice to the owner of an obese cat.

In 1994, Evans co-developed a new animal-rescue based television series with EndemolPet Rescue on Channel 4, becoming both presenter and an associate producer.

Evans has since presented over 1,500 shows, including shows based around pets, wildlife, science and engineering.

=== Animals ===
Evans has worked as a presenter and producer on several animal television shows including Pet Rescue and Inside Nature's Giants.

In 2013, Evans hosted a one-off documentary for Channel 4 called Dogs: Their Secret Lives. A full series followed, beginning on 19 August 2014, as well as a one-off live episode and a revisited episode, both airing in 2014.

In September 2014, Evans began hosting Operation Maneater, a three-part series for Channel 4. It was revealed that, during the filming, Evans had been clipped by a crocodile, leaving him with a split lip and broken teeth. Evans said "For the last 10 months, I haven't been able to bite using my front teeth so have had to tear my food into chunks to eat".

=== Engineering ===
In 1999, Evans co-devised the workshop-based "Is Born" format for Discovery Networks Europe. Since then, he has co-produced and presented ten series for Discovery Home & Leisure (now Discovery Real Time) and are often repeated on Discovery's Quest channel. The shows have transmitted in over 70 countries around the world.

- A Car Is Born (build of an AC Cobra replica) – 15 episodes
- A Plane Is Born (build of a 200 mph kit aeroplane) – 15 episodes
- A Car Is Reborn (total restoration of an E Type Jaguar) – 15 episodes
- A Chopper Is Born (build of a kit, two-seater helicopter) – 15 episode
- A Bike Is Born – Harley (restoration of a Harley WLC45) – 5 episodes
- A Bike Is Born – Bonneville (restoration of a Triumph Bonneville T120R) – 5 episodes
- A Bike Is Born – Trike (build of a Boom Power Trike) – 5 episodes
- A Race Car Is Born (build of a Westfield race car) – 15 episodes
- A 4x4 Is Born (build of an extreme off-road Land Rover) – 15 episodes
- An MG Is Born (restoration of an MGB Roadster) – 10 episodes
- Wreck Rescue – follows his journey to help inspire and motivate the restorers of five very different vehicles to achieve their own restoration dreams.
- Wood Wizard with Richard Blizzard (crafting wooden objects) 15 episodes
- “ Classic British Cars: Made in Coventry" (2021) – a history of the classic cars made in Coventry 1 episode

He also co-devised and presented Dream Machines – a vehicle restoration series on Channel 5.

== Filmography ==
Year	Title	Channel	Role	Notes
1995	Animal Detective	BBC One	Presenter	Award-winning segment on Good Morning
1996–1997	Absolutely Animals	Channel 4	Presenter	16 episodes
1996–1997	Wildlife Rescue	ITV	Presenter	16 episodes
1996–1999	Pet Rescue	Channel 4	Presenter; Associate producer; Format creator	351 episodes
1999	Barking Mad	BBC One	Presenter; Associate producer	24 episodes
2000	Hi-Tech Vets	Animal Planet	Narrator; Executive producer; Format creator	15 episodes
2001–2002	A Question of Squawk; A Celebrity Question of Squawk	Animal Planet	Presenter; Executive producer; Format creator	16 episodes
2009–2012	Inside Nature's Giants	Channel 4	Presenter	18 episodes – Multi-award-winning including BAFTA
2011	Hippo: Nature's Wild Feast	Channel 4	Presenter	Live multi platform event from Zambia nominated for 3 Panda Awards 2012
2012	War Horses: The Real Story	Channel 4	Presenter	Documentary
2012	Foxes Live: Wild in the City	Channel 4	Presenter	6 episode live multi platform event
2013—	Dogs: Their Secret Lives	Channel 4	Presenter	9 episodes (as of 2015 series)
2014	Operation Maneater	Channel 4	Presenter	3 episodes
2014	Dead Famous DNA	Channel 4	Presenter	3 episodes
2018—	My Floating Home	Channel 4	Presenter	5 series (as of 2026 series)
