= A Plane Is Born =

A Plane is Born, presented by Mark Evans, was a 15 part series for Discovery Home and Leisure (now Discovery Real Time), in which he not only learned to fly but also built his own Europa two-seater aeroplane. During the course of the series, he tackled everything from the composite control surfaces to the installation of the engine. The series took the viewer for the first time through the step-by-step process of building a 200 mph kit aircraft, capable of flying from England to the South of France on a single tank of fuel.

== Episode synopsis ==
=== Programme 1 - Research ===
Mark visits the Popular Flying Association Rally at Cranfield to see some of the 3000 or so home-built and vintage aircraft that have flown in for the weekend. He talks to Graham Newby, the chairman of the PFA and the editor of Flyer Magazine who takes him through the pitfalls of building his own plane.

=== Programme 2 - Test Flight ===
Mark travels to the Europa Factory in North Yorkshire where after seeing all the components that go into making a kit, he takes a test flight with Technical Director Andy Draper. In part 2, he starts his private pilot training at Staverton Airport in Gloucestershire with instructor Carl Bowen.

=== Programme 3 - Building Begins ===
Mark learns that before he starts to build his aeroplane he must attend a workshop on composite building techniques. His crash course is instructed by expert Neville Eyre. In part 2, back at the workshop, he begins work on his kit plane, starting with the rudder. Some respite from plastics is provided at Gloucester airport where his flying training continues apace. In a regular feature, Dudley Pattison shows us the Isaac's Fury biplane he took fifteen years to build.

=== Programme 4 - Wings ===
Filming in the workshop, work begins on the Europa's wings and Mark puts his composite skills to the test. In part 2, he continues his flight training as he learns about climbing and descending. Nigel Marshall and Rob Cooper talk about the Pietenpol Air-camper they built at work in their lunch-hours.

=== Programme 5 - You Have Control! ===
Work on the plane continues with the Cockpit module and control yokes. Mark also receives a visit from Neville Eyre, his PFA inspector who checks to see that his work so far is air worthy. Over at Staverton Airport, it's pass the sick bag when he is introduced to "stalling". Finally, we are introduced to an American aircraft owned by Michael Wells where the propeller is at the back.

=== Programme 6 - Tell-Tail! ===
Work on the aeroplane moves to the tailplane and Mark gets to grips with an electronic spirit level. Back at the Flying School, he attempts circuits and touch and go landings. And in another profile of kit aircraft builders, it's the turn of Olle Berquist, an enthusiast from Sweden.

=== Programme 7 - Get in Trim ===
This episode sees the building gathering pace as Mark installs the cockpit module and seats into the aeroplane as well as the trim tabs and actuator into the tail plane. In our regular look at the world of kit aircraft, we meet Steve Pike and Kevin Fagan who have just finished an Australian aircraft - The Jabiru. Back at Staverton Airport, it's a milestone in Mark's Flying progress - with his first solo flight.

=== Programme 8 - Like my Wheels? ===
Mark is back on familiar ground as he fits brakes, wheels and undercarriage to his aeroplane, Martin Dovey introduces us to his vintage kit plane, the Kit Fox, and it is the turn of navigation to further perplex Mark as he continues his flying lessons.

=== Programme 9 - No Longer Topless ===
The programme sees major progress on the plane with the rudder assembly completed and the fuselage top on and finally bonded. Back at Staverton, Mark masters the rudiments of radio communication. In another look at other kit-planes, we meet fellow Europa constructor Peter Kember who was the first ever to home-build a Europa Kit.

=== Programme 10 - All Revved Up ===
It's a red-letter day down at the workshop as the brand new engine arrives with Europa's Andy Draper. Mark takes on the delicate task of fitting the engine to the fuselage as well as connecting fuel lines, the plenum chamber and exhaust manifold. In his flying lesson, he undertakes his first solo cross-country flight. In another feature on the world of home-built aircraft, we meet John Shanley and his futuristic Rutan Long-EZ.

=== Programme 11 - Props Away ===
Part two of the engine installation and Mark takes on the fitting of the ducting, oil and water cooling, radiators, cowlings and finally the propeller. Safety is the theme in Mark's next visit to flying school as he takes us through the A-Check, vital before any flight, while this programme's homebuilder is Lincoln Summers with his motorbike-engined Avid Speedwing.

=== Programme 12 - Instru-Mental ===
It's the bit Mark has been dreading since he started - the wiring and instruments. To give him a better idea, he meets Robin Walsh who explains the differences between instruments and avionics and Ashu Mehta who helps him install the instrument panel. The instrument theme is continued at Aeros Flying School where Mark gets to fly just inches from the ground - in a simulator. In another look at the achievements of other home builders, it's the turn of Bob Harrison and his Europa.

=== Programme 13 - The Final Plush ===
The interior starts to get the red carpet treatment (well Blue actually) as Mark takes on the job of carpeting and upholstering his aeroplane with aircraft trimmer Matthew Leach. At Aeros, it's advanced flying as he gets to grips with steep banked turns and spinning while vintage aircraft feature in another look at PFA aircraft, this episode profiles Steve Leach's 1941 Taylor craft BC65.

=== Programme 14 - Any Colour You Like ===
A Red letter day as Mark prepares for his PPL Test at Aeros, and we recap his flying lessons from throughout the series; meanwhile, his aeroplane is transformed with a coat of paint and Mark applies the decals to make it unique. Finally it is the turn of Tony Palmer to show us his own pride and joy - his Avid Speedwing.

=== Programme 15 - Up, Up & Away! ===
The final episode in the series sees the newly built plane go through the final checks it needs for its certificate of air-worthiness. Mark must see if it will pass and he can finally realise his dream to fly his very own aeroplane.

== See also ==
- Mark Evans (TV Host)
