= Inside Nature's Giants =

- Genre: Documentary
- Created by: Mark Burnett
- Developed by: 4International
- Presented by: Mark Evans
- Narrated by: Nick Jack
- Theme music composer: Will Slater
- Opening theme: Nature
- Ending theme: Nature (Instrumental)
- Country of origin: United Kingdom
- Original language: English
- No. of series: 4
- No. of episodes: 18

Production
- Executive producers: Ed Forsdick; Peter Gywn
- Producer: Martin Dance
- Camera setup: 3SIXTYMEDIA
- Production companies: ITV Studios; Lion Television; Windfall Films

Original release
- Network: Channel 4; Channel 4 HD
- Release: 29 June 2009 – 23 April 2012

Inside Nature's Giants is a British science documentary, first broadcast in June 2009 by Channel 4. The documentary shows experts performing dissection on some of nature's largest animals, including whales and elephants.

The programme is presented by Mark Evans. The series attempts to uncover the secrets of the animals examined. Mark is assisted by evolutionary biologists Richard Dawkins and Simon Watt, and comparative anatomist Joy Reidenberg. In 2012, it aired on PBS in the United States, and repeats occasionally air on Eden and Watch in the UK.

== Episodes ==
=== Series 1 (2009) ===
Episode Number	Episode Name	Animal(s)	Broadcast Date
1	The Elephant	Asian elephant	29 June 2009
2	The Whale	Fin whale	6 July 2009
3	The Crocodile	Nile crocodile	13 July 2009
4	The Giraffe	Rothschild giraffe	20 July 2009

Note: The season received the 2010 BAFTA Television Award for Best Specialist Factual.

=== Series 2 (2010) ===
Episode Number	Episode Name	Animal(s)	Broadcast Date
1	The Great White Shark	Great white shark	8 June 2010
2	The Monster Python	Burmese python	15 June 2010
3	The Big Cats	Lion and tiger	22 June 2010
Special	The Giant Squid	Giant squid	14 October 2010

=== Series 3 (2011) ===
Episode Number	Episode Name	Animal(s)	Broadcast Date
Special	The Polar Bear	Polar bear	30 June 2011
Special	The Sperm Whale	Sperm whale	7 August 2011
1	The Camel	Dromedary camel	30 August 2011
2	The Dinosaur Bird	Southern cassowary	6 September 2011
3	The Leatherback Turtle	Leatherback sea turtle	13 September 2011
4	The Racehorse	Thoroughbred horse	20 September 2011

=== Series 4 (2012) ===
Episode Number	Episode Name	Animal(s)	Broadcast Date
Special	Rogue Baboon	Chacma baboon (Fred)	10 January 2012
1	The Hippo	Hippopotamus	9 April 2012
2	The Kangaroo	Red kangaroo	16 April 2012
3	The Jungle	Borneo jungle	23 April 2012
