= Adolph Friedländer =

German lithographer

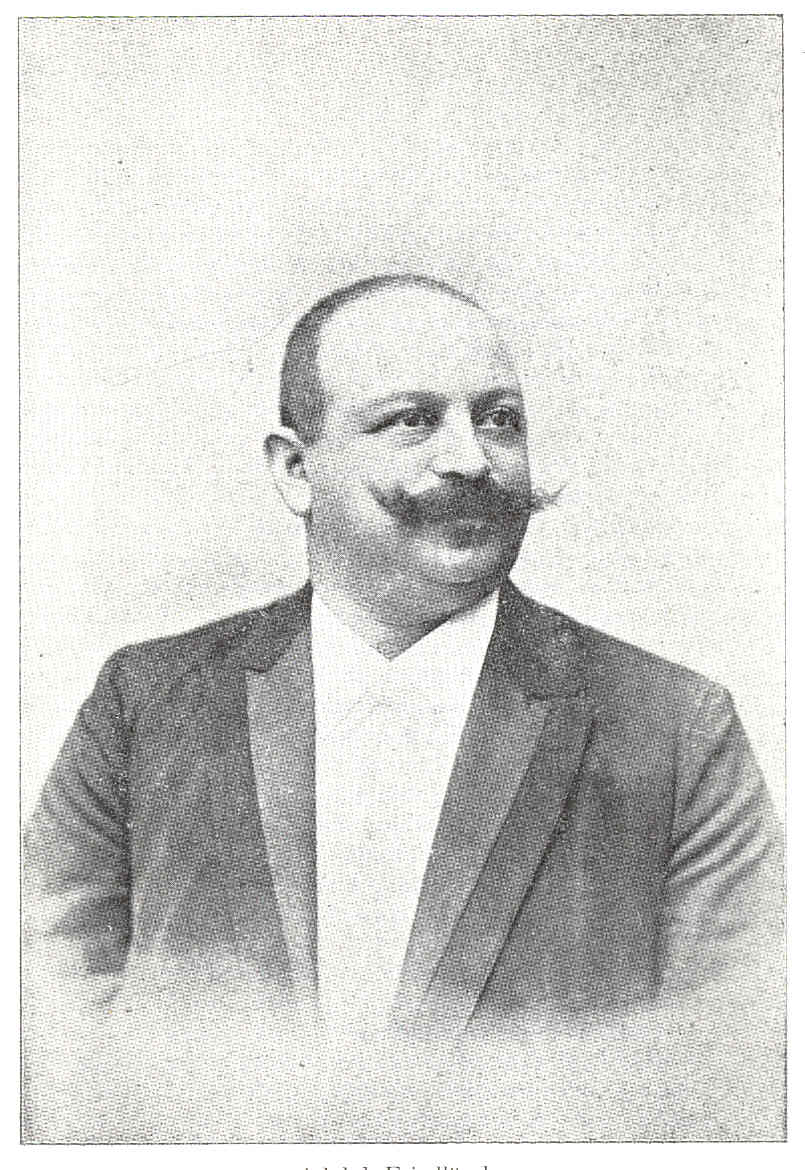
- Adolph Friedländer, c. 1895
- Born: 17 April 1851; Hamburg
- Died: 7 July 1904 (aged 53); Hamburg
- Occupation: Lithographer

Adolph Friedländer (17 April 1851 – 7 July 1904) was a famed German lithographer of posters and a publisher hailing from Hamburg. His printshop produced over 9,000 posters between 1872 and 1935, predominantly for artists, magicians and circus and vaudeville performers. First learning lithography at his father's shop in Hamburg, he received formal training in Berlin and returned to operate independently in 1872. First concentrating on labels for businesses, he turned to poster printing to cater to the many artists and performers which operated nearby to the location of his business.

Friedländer expanded his business to cover manuscript printing and established two magazines. The first was Der Kurier ("The Courier") which ran from 1890 to 1901, and then Der Anker ("The Anchor") which ran from 1902 to 1928. After his death, Friedländer's sons, Otto Max and Ludwig took over operations. The business suffered greatly when World War I broke out because the entertainment industry, the printshop's lifeblood, came to a virtual standstill. Business picked up in the 1920s but in 1928 the Great Depression intervened. After the Nazi regime came into power in 1933, the business, run by a Jewish family but a "Devisenbringer,"—a company that brought in foreign currency—was allowed to continue for a few more years but was finally shut down.

== Life and work ==
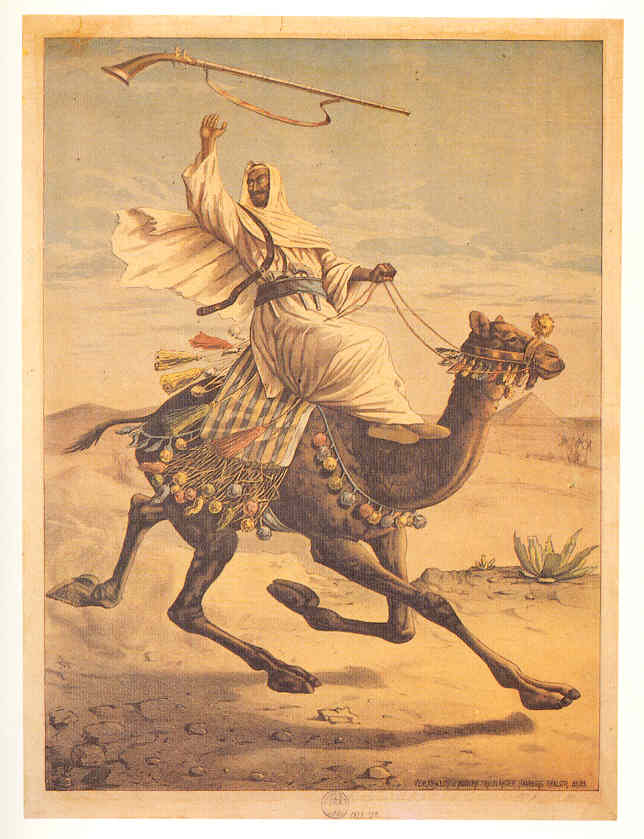
1890 Friedländer poster for a Carl Hagenbeck show

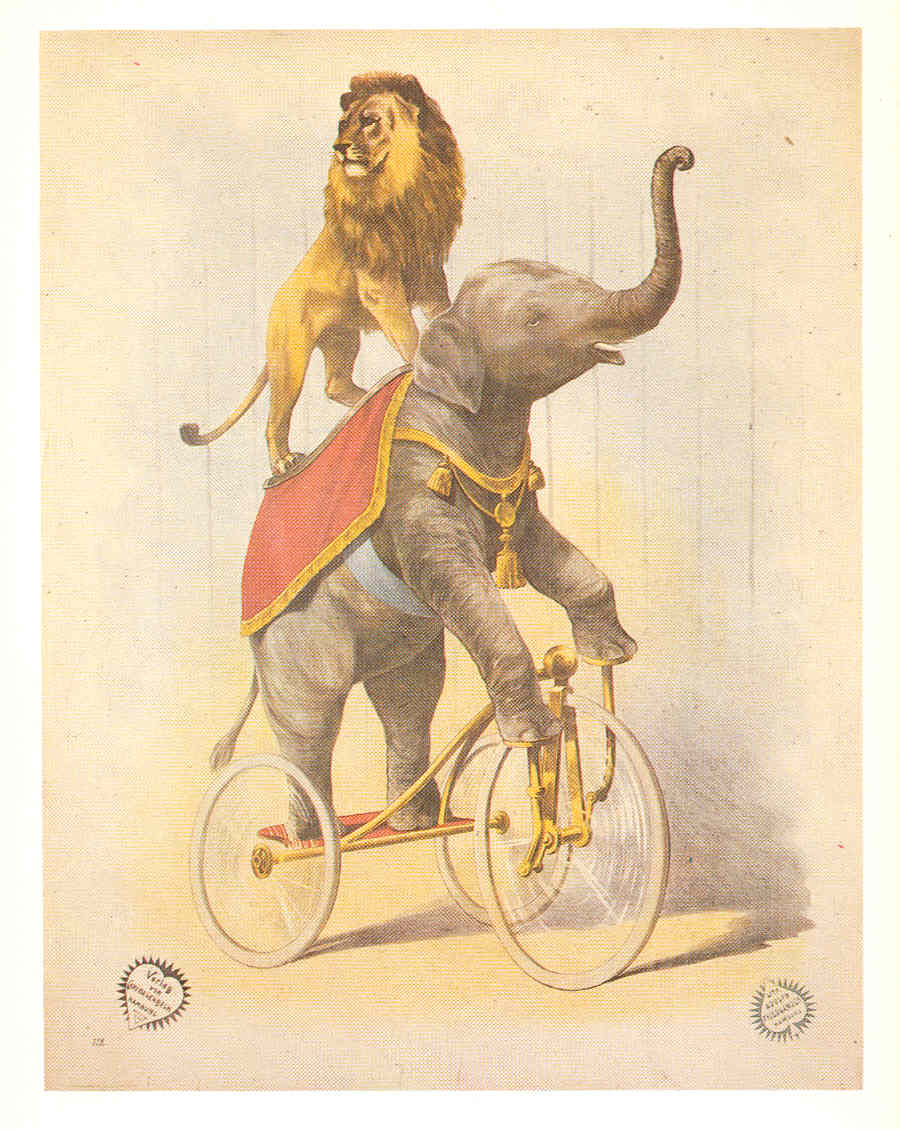
1895/1896 Friedländer Poster: Löwe auf Elefant ("Lion on elephant")

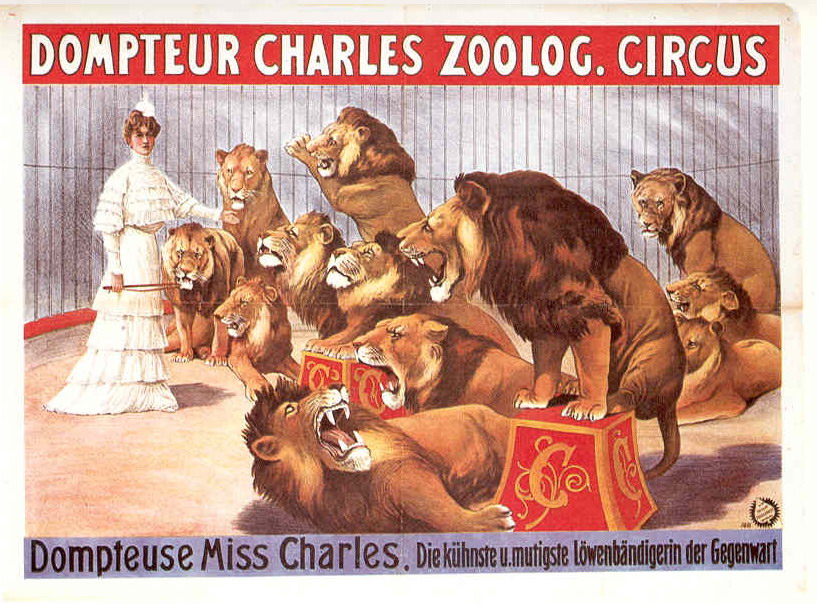
1905/1906 Friedländer Poster: Dompteuse Miss Charles ("Lion Tamer Miss Charles"). The woman depicted is Ida Krone, the wife of circus director Carl Krone

Friedländer was the third and last son of Raphael Israel Friedländer and Betty Friedländer née Wagner. Prior to moving to Hamburg, Friedländer's father worked as a merchant. After the move however, Raphael joined a guild of professional lithographers and opened a small lithography shop. Friedländer first received informal training at his father's shop and in the summer of 1865, went to Berlin for more formal instruction. By 1868, Friedländer was apprenticed to top German lithographers. In 1872 Friedländer returned to Hamburg and began working as an independent printmaker. On 1 April 1875 he married one Sarah Berling, also from Hamburg, under Jewish rites.

After his father died, Friedländer inherited his old lithographic press and set up shop in the St. Pauli quarter of Hamburg. He initially concentrated on label printing for kolonialwaren and delikatesswaren (types of gourmet grocers). Friedländer's shop was located nearby to the Spielbudenplatz, an area of numerous beer halls, vaudeville theaters, music halls and other exhibition spaces. Deciding these presented a better business opportunity, he abandoned label printing and focused instead on selling posters to these businesses utilizing the complex four-color lithographic process he had learned in France. Friedländer breakthrough moment came when he received large orders of posters advertising Carl Hagenbeck's animal shows in 1883 and 1884.

To accommodate his growing business needs, in 1884 Friedländer purchased a photolithographic press capable of making 600 prints per hour. In the following years he expanded his business and its machinery to include manuscript publishing capability. The addition necessitated a move to a larger space which transpired in 1887. In 1890, Friedländer published the first issue of Der Kurier ("The Courier"), a magazine founded by his publishing house, which concerned matters of interest for showmen, traders, circus workers, vaudeville and stage performers, and related professions. In 1891 Der Kurier was run full-time by Adolf Fischl. In 1901 it was edited by Max Cohn but ceased publication that same year. The following year Friedländer established, Der Anker ("The Anchor"). Billed as an international trade magazine for showmen and artists, it operated from 1902 to 1928.

From the mid-1890s Friedländer also printed postcards, a new medium that was in particularly high use by circus workers and artists. His main business was, however, poster printing. Starting in the early 1890s, Friedländer printed approximately 100 different posters designs annually. By the turn of the century the number had doubled. Friedländer died on 7 July 1904. According to his obituary appearing in the 9 July 1904 issue (No. 159) of the Hamburg Generalanzeiger (The Hamburg General Gazette), his death came about "nach langem schweren Leiden" ("after very severe suffering").

== Friedländer's press, 1904 to 1935 ==
After his death, Friedländer's sons, Ludwig Friedländer (1877–1953) and Max Otto Friedländer (1880–1953) took over his company's operations. When World War I broke out in 1914, the entertainment industry came to a virtual standstill, which had a concomitant effect on the need for the company's posters. Print volume rose in the 1920s, but then fell off sharply to a level of about 100 poster designs per year as a result of the Great Depression.

In addition to working at the family business, Otto Max also managed the Flora Theater until 1934, at which time he traveled with the Sarrasani circus to South America. Finding little possibility of an existence there, he returned to Germany in 1935, only to be quickly sent to a concentration camp. Ludwig transitioned the company to use of modern offset printing, working with chief draftsman Wilhelm Eigener (1904–1982) who specialized in wildlife illustration. The traditional printer's mark of the company was a heart-shaped leaf with serrated edges, sometimes called a "Judenkirsche" ("Jews cherry"). Despite the Jewish origin of the company, as a "Devisenbringer"—a company that brought in foreign currency—the print shop was tolerated for a time after the Nazi regime came into power in 1933.

Friedländer's press employed specialist artists for different types of posters, including Christian Bettels, considered one of the best animal draftsmen of his time. The company produced over 9,000 posters over its lifetime, catering almost exclusively to artists, magicians and circus and vaudeville performers. In 1935, the last poster designed by the Friedländer company appeared with the production number 9,078.

== Reception ==
Friedländer posters can be found in antiquarian shops, in private collections and in museums such as the Munich Stadtmuseum. Since the late 1970s, his posters have drawn increasing attention, being featured in exhibitions and published works. Approximately 200 posters were published in 1979 by Ruth Malhotra. In 2002, Stephan Oettermann and Jan J. Seffinga created an index of Friedländer posters containing detailed descriptions of the works and an extensive bibliography; in 2004 a fourth revised edition was issued. A Dutch private collection is available online.

Friedländer's posters have been often reprinted and are available from many sources. Despite their recognizable provenance, not all Friedländer poster designs displayed his printer's mark, nor the direct authorship note sometimes included: "Lith Adolph Friedländer Hamburg". Accordingly, it is believed that there are still original designs in existence that are yet to be found.

== Gallery ==
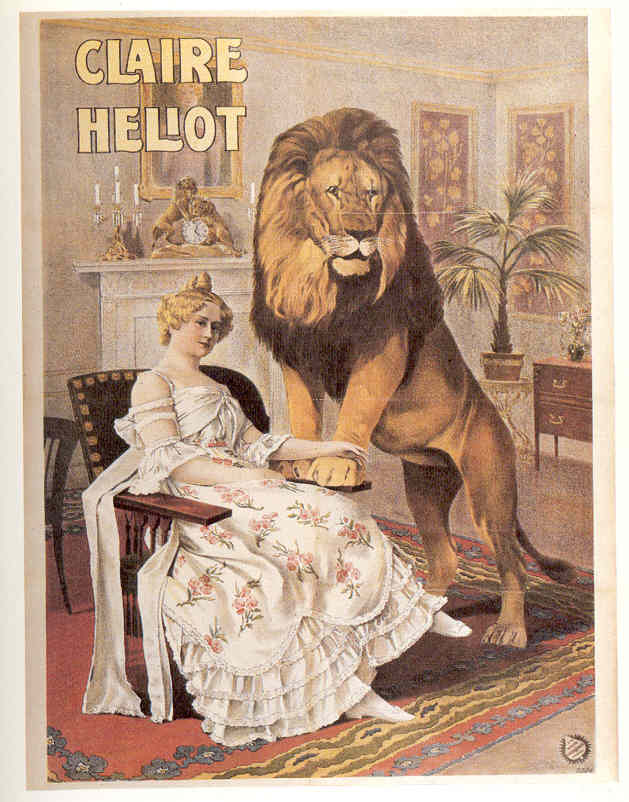
Claire Heliot (1903)

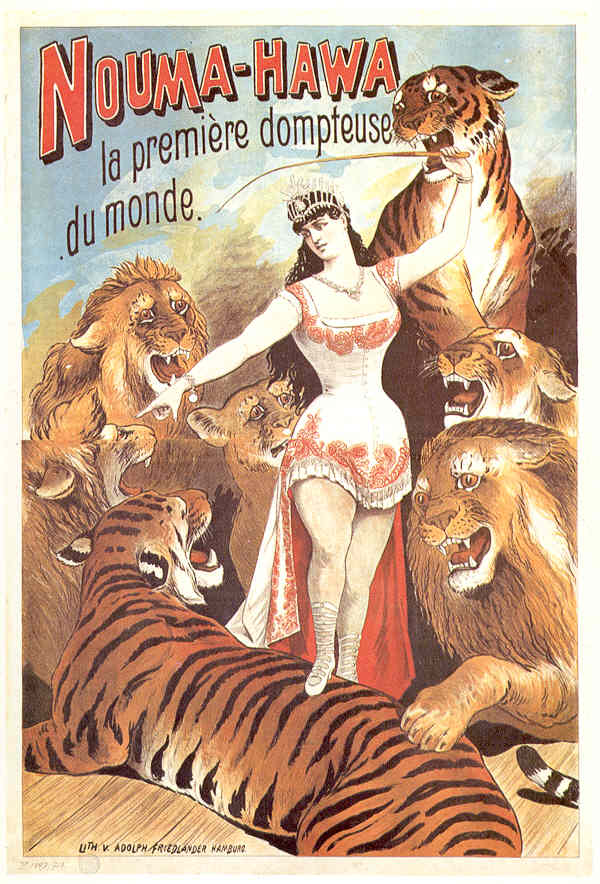
Nouma Hawa - La première dompteuse du monde (1888/1889)

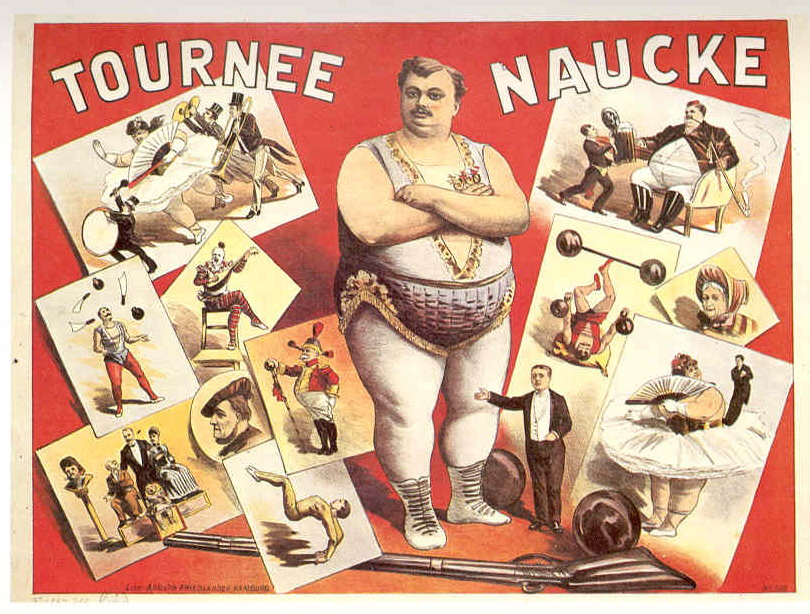
Tournee Naucke. (1893/1894)

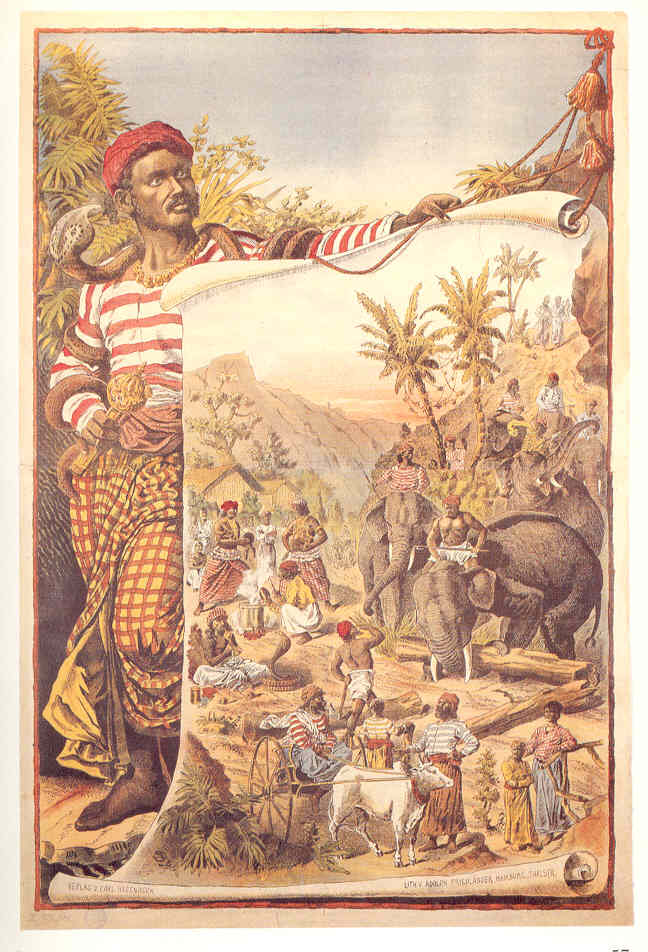
Poster for a Carl Hagenbeck show (1886)

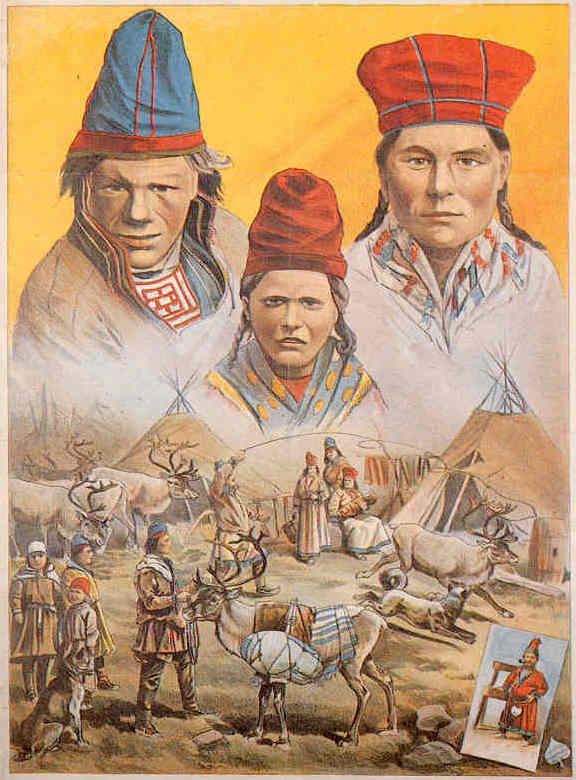
Poster for a Carl Hagenbeck show (1893/1894)

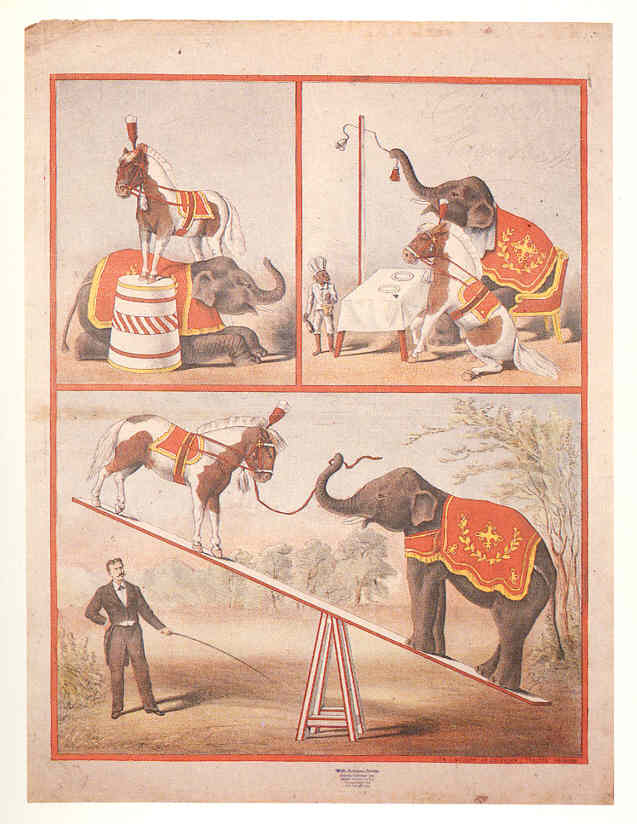
Circus poster (1888 or earlier)

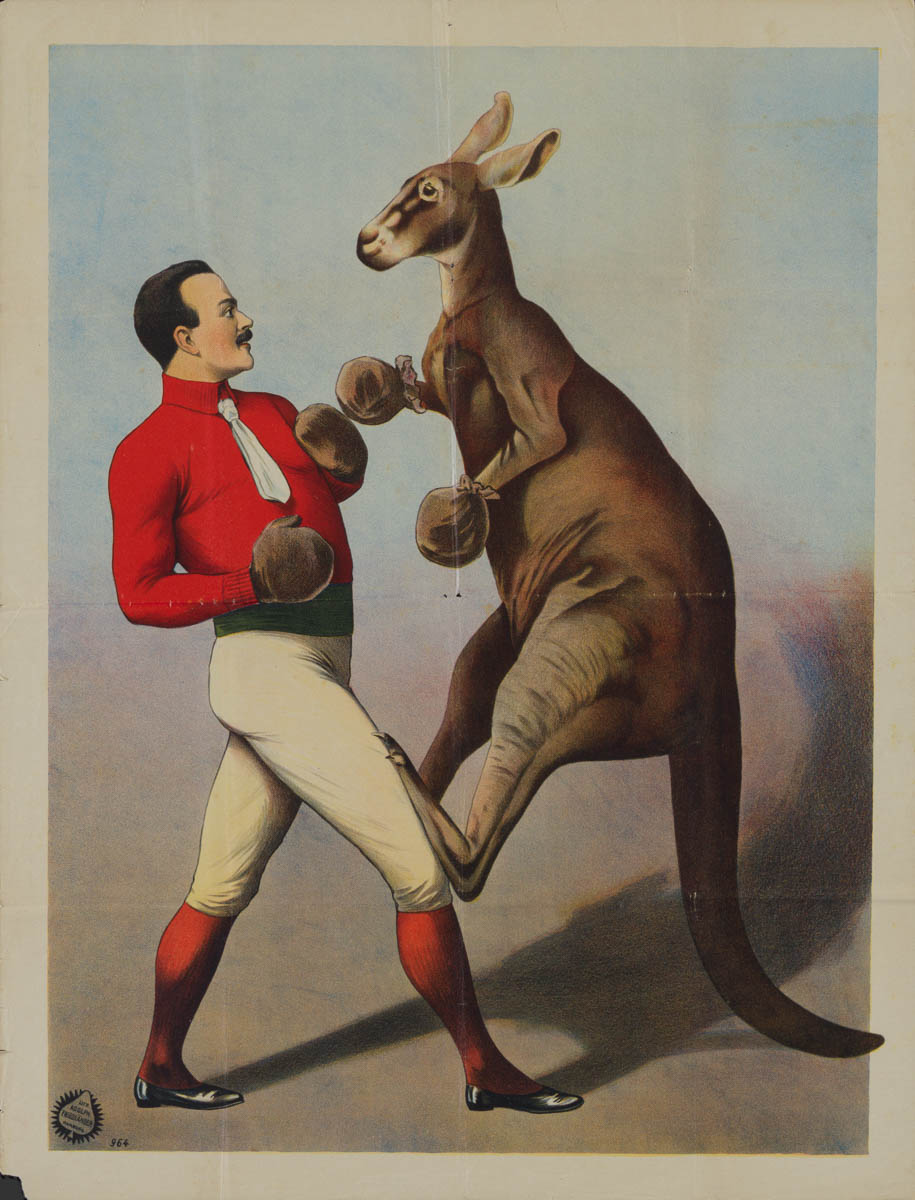
Kangaroo Boxing poster (1890s #964)

== Bibliography ==
- Ruth Malhotra: Manege frei. Artisten- und Zirkusplakate von Adolph Friedländer. Dortmund 1979
- Stephan Oettermann, Jan. J. Seffinga: Adolph Friedländer Lithos. Gerolzhofen 2002
