= Joy Reidenberg =

Television presenter, animal anatomist

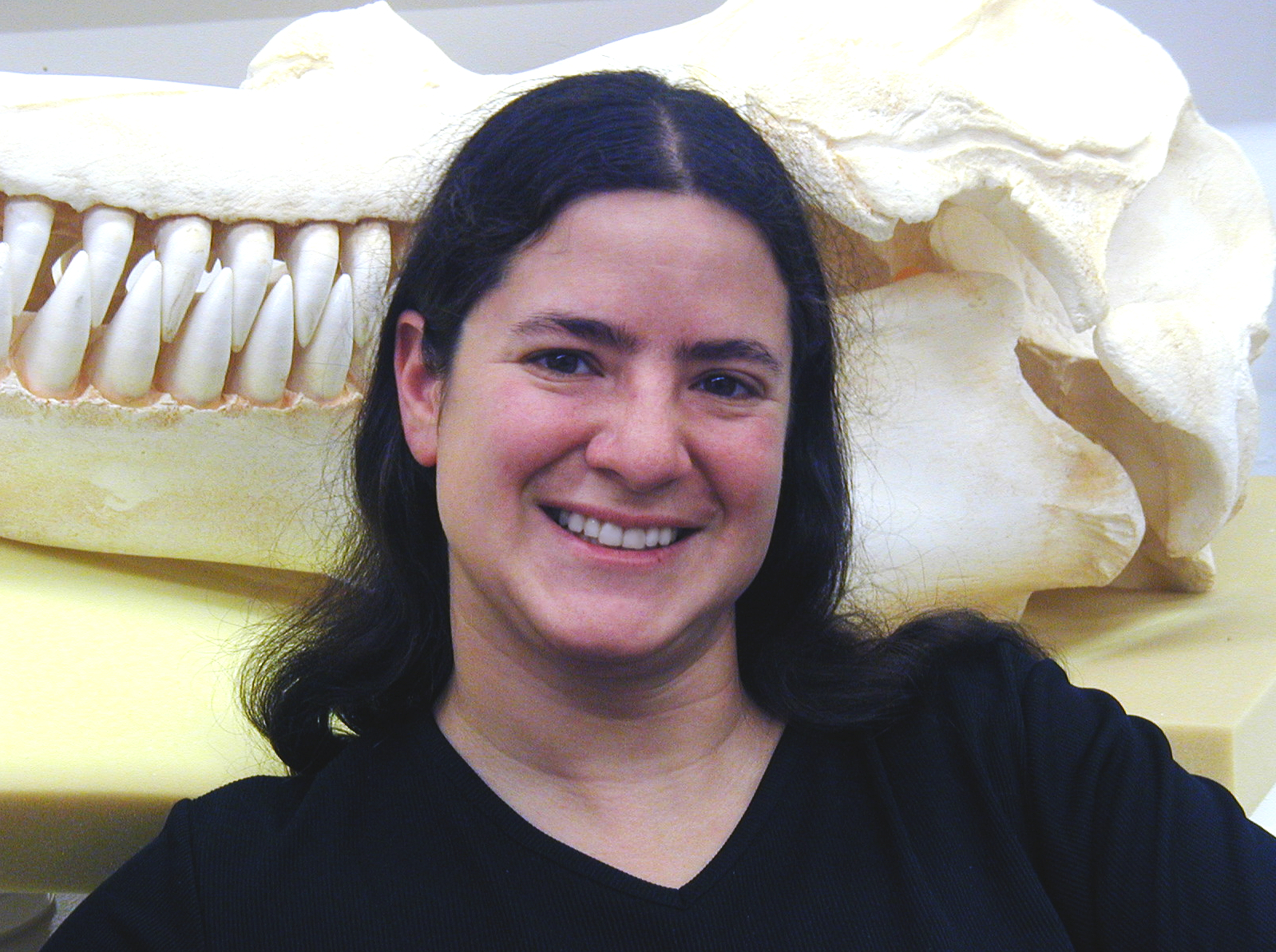
- Education: Cornell University (BA) Mount Sinai (MPhil) Mount Sinai (PhD)
- Alma mater: Cornell (BA) Mount Sinai (M Phil) Mount Sinai (PhD)
- Occupation: Comparative Anatomist
- Employer(s): Full Professor, Center for Anatomy and Functional Morphology, and Department of Medical Education, Icahn School of Medicine at Mount Sinai
- Known for: Inside Nature's Giants
- Website: http://www.mssm.edu/profiles/joy-s-reidenberg

Joy S. Gaylinn Reidenberg is an American comparative anatomist specializing in the vocal and breathing apparatus of mammals, particularly cetaceans (whales, including dolphins and porpoises). She is best known as the Comparative Anatomist in the TV science documentary series Inside Nature's Giants where she has dissected a number of animals varying in species.

== Education ==
Reidenberg became interested in animal science and art as a high school student. She earned a bachelor's degree (B.A.) from Cornell University in 1983, a master's (M.Phil.) from the Mount Sinai School of Medicine Graduate Program in Biological Sciences in 1985, and a doctorate (Ph.D.) in Biomedical Sciences: Anatomy in 1988. There, she worked with anthropologist Jeffrey Laitman.

== Career ==
=== Media ===
In 2009, a British production company now known as Windfall Films approached her about coming to Ireland on short notice to help dissect a 19.8 m (65 ft) fin whale that had washed up on the south coast. She conducted the dissection, and the company was so happy with her performance that they asked her to become a regular contributor to Inside Nature's Giants, dissecting a variety of animals (18 episodes in total), and explaining their anatomy.. Reidenberg has also starred in the 4-episode series "Sex in the Wild" on PBS (known as "Born in the Wild" on Channel 4 in the UK). She was also featured in a 3-day live series called "Big Blue Live" on PBS about marine life in Monterey Bay, California.

=== Academic ===
Reidenberg is a professor at the Icahn School of Medicine at Mount Sinai's Center for Anatomy and Functional Morphology, where she teaches Human Anatomy (including gross anatomy, histology, embryology, and imaging). She was also the Course Director for General Anatomy at the New York College of Podiatric Medicine. from 2014 to 2020.

=== Spade-toothed whale dissection ===
On December 2, 2024, Joy Reidenberg participated in a week-long dissection of a 5-meter (16.4 ft) male spade-toothed whale in New Zealand. She was one of three US anatomists to join the dissection which was the first of its kind, as only 6 specimens of the species have been recorded as of 2024.

=== Awards ===
- British Academy Television Award for Best Specialist Factual
