= Chris Barns =

Australian kangaroo sanctuary founder

Chris Barns, nicknamed "Brolga", is an Australian kangaroo carer. He is the founder of the Kangaroo Sanctuary in Alice Springs. Barns and the Kangaroo Sanctuary came to greater international attention when Roger, one of the earlier kangaroos which he adopted, went viral for his muscular physique. Barns was featured in the 2013 BBC documentary series Kangaroo Dundee and served as the inspiration for the 2025 film Kangaroo.

== Early life ==
Barns grew up in Perth in Western Australia, in the 1970s and was a shy child who did not excel in school. He partially attributes this to being 6 feet (182cms) tall by his early teens. Barns left home at the age of 17 to work as a zoo keeper in Broome, going to work at several wildlife parks before starting work as a tour guide.

== Work with kangaroos ==
In the early 2000s, while working as a tour guide running tours between Alice Springs and Uluru, Barns came across a joey, still in its dead mother's pouch, near Curtin Springs. The kangaroo mother, who had been hit by a car, had been dead for some time. With the help of a nurse on the tour, Barns managed to free the 4-month-old joey. The tour group named it Anna (later renamed Palau). This experience made Barns angry about how many vehicles had already driven past the dead mother and not thought to check that she may have a joey. He decided that it would be his mission to tell people about how to check for this.

Following this, in 2005, Barns started the first incarnation of the Kangaroo Sanctuary, the Baby Kangaroo Rescue Centre, and many joeys started being sent to him, mostly through a combination of road accidents and hunting. In 2007 alone, 75 joeys were brought into the sanctuary, including Roger on 24 May 2007; it was initially thought he would not survive long.

In 2009, after exceeding capacity at the existing site, Barns moved to what is now known as the Kangaroo Sanctuary, funded primarily by donation and entry fees.

In 2013, Barns and the sanctuary were featured in the BBC documentary series Kangaroo Dundee, a six-part series which he followed up with the book Kangaroo Dundee with James Knight.

In 2014, Barns married Tahnee Passmore and they share their home with a family of joeys. Barns has said that:

"Home is the bush - I have my home where my parents are ... and then the home in my spirit is the bush. And the bush can be anywhere - it's that sense of freedom ... that's where I'm happiest."

— Chris Barns, How kangaroo rescuer Chris 'Brolga' Barns found his purpose on The Road to Alice
